= List of locomotives of Rhodesia and Zimbabwe =

List of locomotives of Rhodesia Railways, 80–90 of which went to Zambia Railways in 1967. Rhodesia Railways became National Railways of Zimbabwe in 1980.

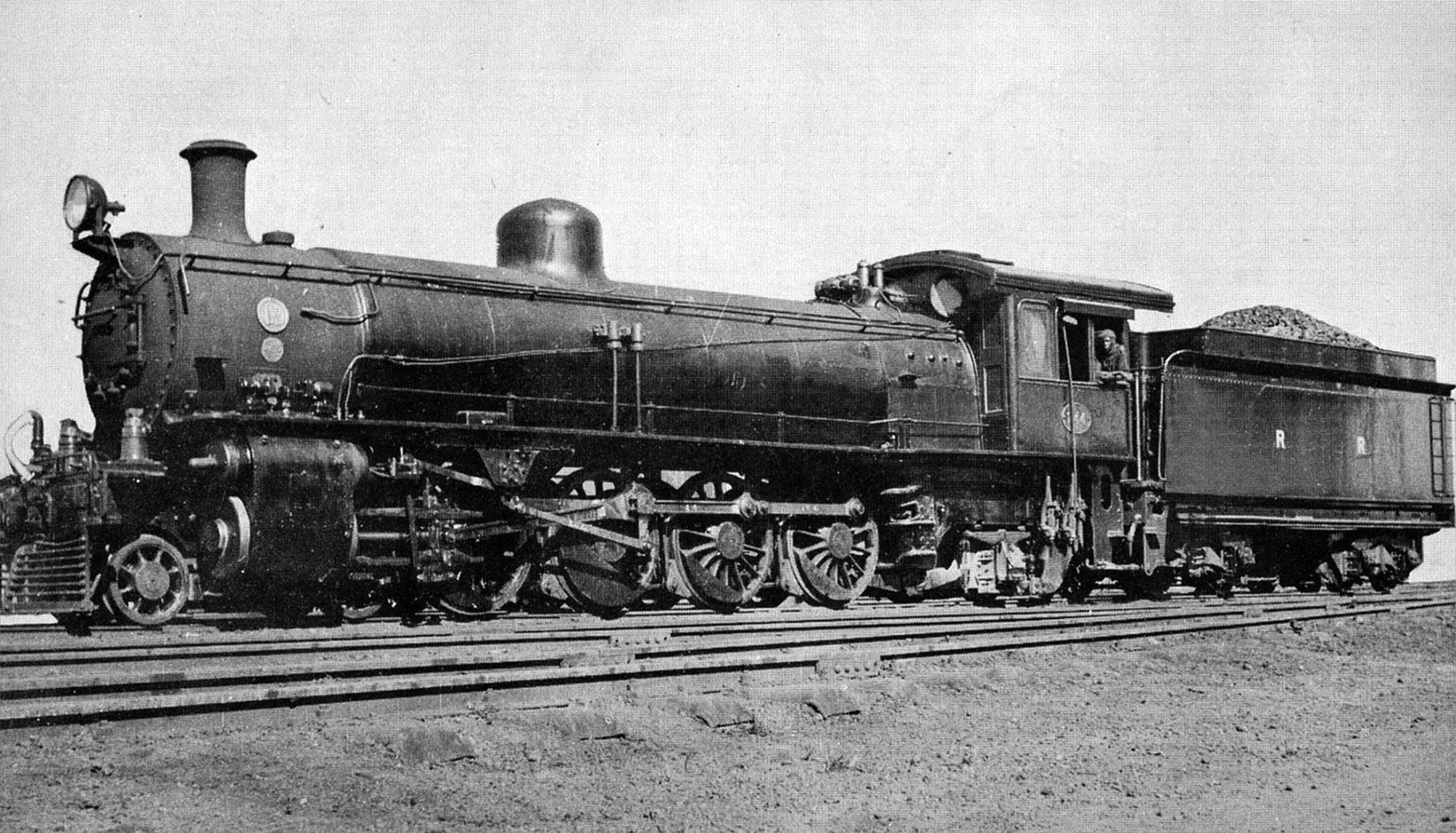
Rhodesia Railways 10th class

== Steam ==
Class	Wheel arrangement	Fleet number(s)	Manufacturer	Serial number(s)	Year made	Quantity made	Quantity preserved	Year(s) withdrawn	Comments
6th	4-8-2T	8-10, 13, 14, 18-22				9			Rebuilt from 7th class
6A	4-8-4T	11, 12, 15, 16				4			Rebuilt from 7th class
7th	4-8-0	1-50	Neilson, Reid & Company; Kitson & Company; North British Locomotive Company	5677-5686, 5791-5802; 4062-4069; 16085-16094, 16171-16180	1899-1900; 1901; 1903	22; 8; 20			Same as South African Class 7
8th	4-8-0	53-62; 63-65; 66-69	North British Locomotive Company	16216-16225; 19317-19319; 19356-19359	1904; 1910; 1910	10; 3; 4		1938-1940	63-65 later renumbered as 77-79; 66-69 later renumbered as 73-76
9th	4-8-0	80-91; 92-97; 105-110; 111-116	North British Locomotive Company; Beyer, Peacock & Company	19743-19754; 19818-19823; 5914-5919; 21474-21479	1912; 1912; 1915; 1917	12; 6; 6; 6			
9A	4-8-0	117-122	American Locomotive Company	56724-56729	1916	6	1		No. 122 preserved in Bulawayo Railway Museum, 117 to Zambia
9B	4-8-0	80-84, 86-90, 92-95, 97, 105-108, 110, 111, 113-116				25			Rebuilt from 9th class, 84,88,113 to Zambia
10th	4-8-2	98-104; 153-158; 159; 241-246	North British Locomotive Company	19996-20002; 22796-22801; 23089; 23972-23977	1913; 1922; 1924; 1930	7; 6; 1; 6			
11th	4-8-2	123-131; 132-140; 141-152	Montreal Locomotive Works	59115-59123; 59940-59948; 62773-62784	1918; 1919; 1921	9; 9; 12	1		No. 127 preserved in Bulawayo Railway Museum
11A	4-8-2	304-315	Montreal Locomotive Works	75468-75479	1948	12		1961	All sold to Caminhos de Ferro de Moçambique in 1961, fleet numbers CFM 451-462
12th	4-8-2	172-191; 192-194; 195-214; 247-258	North British Locomotive Company	23373-23392; 23592-23594; 23772/3, 23724-23741; 23996-24007	1926; 1927; 1928; 1930	20; 3; 20; 12			176, 178, 179, 181, 183, 184, 186, 188, 189, 191-193, 196, 197, 199-202, 204, 210, 249, 252, 255, 257 to Zambia
12A	4-8-2	198, 212, 213				3			Rebuilt from 12th class frames with new 11A-type boilers
13th	2-6-2+2-6-2	160–171	Beyer, Peacock & Company	6269–6280	1925-1926	12			
14th	2-6-2+2-6-2	215–220; 231–240	Beyer, Peacock & Company	6510–6515; 6618–6625	1928; 1929	6; 10			215–220, 231, 232 sold to Caminhos de Ferro de Moçambique 1949, fleet numbers CFM 901-908, 233-240 renumbered 500-507
14A	2-6-2+2-6-2	508–525	Beyer, Peacock & Company	7581–7592, 7599-7604	1953	18			
15th	4-6-4+4-6-4	350-353; 354-363; 364–383	Beyer, Peacock & Company	6936–6939; 7228–7237; 7260–7279	1940; 1947; 1948-49	4; 10; 20			350-363 originally numbered 271-284, 357, 359, 365, 373, 392, 401, 402, 405, 408 to Zambia
15A	4-6-4+4-6-4	384–413; 414-423	Beyer, Peacock & Company	7326–7340, 7351–7365; 7555–7564	1949–50; 1952	30; 10			Same as 15th, but with higher boiler pressure. 404 renumbered 424. 414-423 subcontracted to Société Franco-Belge (2963–2972).
16th	2-8-2+2-8-2	600-607; 608-619	Beyer, Peacock & Company	6562–6569; 6877–6882, 6899–6904	1929; 1938	8; 12			Originally numbered 221-228 and 259-270.
16A	2-8-2+2-8-2	620–649	Beyer, Peacock & Company	7498–7527	1952–53	30			625, 626, 628-633, 635-638, 643, 645, 647, 648, 627, 634, 639 renumbered 601-618; 620-624, 630, 640-642, 644, 646, 649 to Zambia
17th	4-6-4+4-6-4	271–280	Beyer, Peacock & Company	6798–6801, 6870–6875	1936-37	10		1964	Ex Sudan Railways 250-259. Acquired 1949, sold to Caminhos de Ferro de Moçambique in 1964, fleet numbers CFM 921-930
18th	2-8-2+2-8-2	281–289	Beyer, Peacock & Company	7066–7074	1943–44	9			Ex War Department 74409-74417. War Department Heavy Garratt type.
19th	4-8-2	316–335	Henschel & Son	27386–27405	1951–52	20	1		Same as South African Railways Class 19D. No. 330 preserved in Bulawayo Railway Museum
19B	4-8-2	337–338	Henschel & Son	27409–27410	1952	2			Ex Nkana Mine's nos. 107 and 108
19C	4-8-2	336	Henschel & Son	27411	1953	1			19th class with condensing gear, later removed
20th	4-8-2+2-8-4	700–720	Beyer, Peacock & Company	7685–7699; 7780–7785	1954; 1957	15; 6			701-704, 706, 708, 710-715, 718-720 to Zambia Railways; 705, 707, 709, 710, 714, 716-718 rebuilt and renumbered 730–737
20A	4-8-2+2-8-4	721–760	Beyer, Peacock & Company	7786–7825	1957–58	40			721, 722, 725, 728, 730-737, 739-745, 748, 750-752, 754, 755, 757-759 to Zambia Railways; 723, 724, 726, 727, 729, 738, 746, 747, 753, 749, 756 rebuilt and renumbered 740–750

== Diesel ==
Class	Wheel arrangement	Fleet number(s)	Manufacturer	Serial number(s)	Year made	Quantity made	Quantity preserved	Year(s) withdrawn	Comments
DE1	Co-Co	1000-1005	Davenport Locomotive Works	3409-3414	1952	6		1985	Originally Rhodesia Chrome 1-6, to RR 1000-1005 1957. Renumbered from 1000-1005 to 0101-0106 by NRZ 1982. 0106 (ex-1005) preserved in Bulawayo Railway Museum
DE2	1Co-Co1	1200–1222 Dick Kerr Works, 1223-1234 with Vulcan Foundry	English Electric	2231-2263 / 2492-2503 and VF D405-D416	1955–56 (1200-1222), 1958 (1223-1234)	35			1200 preserved in Bulawayo Railway Museum; 1207 preserved by Sandstone Estates
DE3	1Co-Co1	1300-1315	English Electric with Vulcan Foundry	3248-3263 and VF D734-D749	1962	16			1314 preserved in Bulawayo Railway Museum
DE4	Co-Co	1400-1413	Brush Traction	399-412	1964	14			1407 preserved in Bulawayo Railway Museum
DE5	Co-Co	1500–1534	Arnold Jung Lokomotivfabrik (1); David Poole (34)	1500 = 14125, 1501-1534 unknown	1971–76	35			1531 preserved in Bulawayo Railway Museum
DE6	Co-Co	1600–1609	General Electric	36042–36051	1966	10			GE U20C
DE7	Co-Co	1700-1735	Simmering-Graz-Pauker	18402-18413, 18434-18457	1971 (1700-1712), 1973 (1712-1735)	36	1		1708 preserved in Bulawayo Railway Museum
DE8	Co-Co	1800–1813	Sorefame	943-956	1974	14	0	1991	
DE8A	Co-Co	1814–1833	Sorefame	957-964, 1419-1430	1974 (1814-1821), 1975 (1822-1833)	20			
DE8B	Co-Co	1834–1853	Sorefame	1431-1450	1976–77	20	2		1837 & 1845 preserved in Bulawayo Railway Museum
DE9	Bo-Bo	1900–1919	GE / B&W (Spain)	1053-1072	20				GE U10B, built in Spain
DE9A	Bo-Bo	1920–1963	GE / B&W (Spain)	1120-1162,1178	44				GE U11B, built in Spain
DE10	Co-Co	1001–1035	EMD	818002-1/25,818039-1/10	1981–1982	35			EMD GT22LC-2
DE10A	Co-Co	1036–1061	GMD	A4252–A4277	1982	26			EMD GT22LC-2
DE10B	Co-Co	1062	NRZ		1989 (rebuilt)	1	0	1991	Rebuilt from 1814 with GM 12-645E3B engine, AR6/CA5 generator, and cab from 1803. Wrecked 21 March 1991; not repaired; scrapped.

== Electric ==
Class	Wheel arrangement	Fleet number(s)	Manufacturer	Serial number(s)	Year made	Quantity made	Quantity preserved	Year(s) withdrawn	Comments
EL1	Co-Co	4101-30	50 Cycle Group		1980/3	30			
