= Rhodesia Railways 15th class =

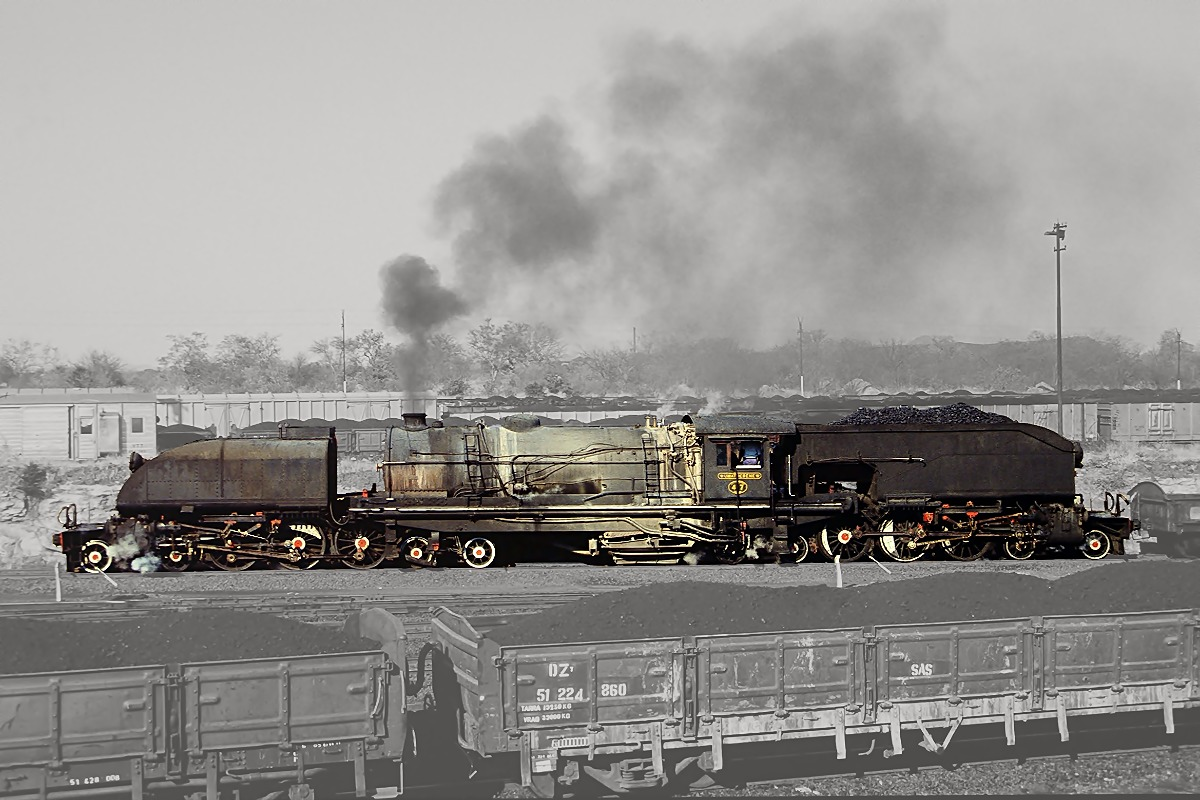
- 15th class No. 417 arrives at Thomson Junction, Zimbabwe, with a freight train from Victoria Falls
Type and origin
- Power type: Steam
- Builder: Beyer, Peacock & Company; Société Franco-Belge
- Build date: 1940–1952
- Total produced: 74
Specifications
- Configuration
  - Whyte: 4-6-4+4-6-4
- Gauge: 3 ft 6 in (1,067 mm) Cape gauge
- Driver dia.: 57 in (1,448 mm)
- Axle load: 14 long tons 15 cwt (33,000 lb or 15 t)
- Adhesive weight: 76 long tons 19 cwt (172,400 lb or 78.2 t)
- Loco weight: 180 long tons 18 cwt (405,200 lb or 183.8 t)
- Firebox
  - Grate area: 47.5 sq ft (4.41 m^{2})
- Boiler pressure: 15th: 180 psi (1.24 MPa); 15A: 200 psi (1.38 MPa)
- Heating surface
  - Firebox: 212 sq ft (19.7 m^{2})
  - Tubes and flues: 2,110 sq ft (196 m^{2})
- Superheater
  - Heating area: 494 sq ft (45.9 m^{2})
- Cylinders: Four
- Cylinder size: 17.5 in × 26 in (444 mm × 660 mm)
Performance figures
- Tractive effort: 15th: 42,740 lbf (190.1 kN); 15A: 47,490 lbf (211.2 kN)
Career
- Operators: Rhodesia Railways; Zambia Railways; National Railways of Zimbabwe
- Class: 15th, 15A

The Rhodesia Railways 15th class (later Zambia Railways and National Railways of Zimbabwe 15th classes), was the second-largest class of Garratt locomotives, with 74 locomotives built. Only the Class GMA/GMAM of the South African Railways was more numerous with 120 locomotives.

== Development and delivery ==
The 4-6-4+4-6-4 wheel arrangement is sometimes called a "Double Baltic" or "Double Hudson" Garratt. The Rhodesia Railways (RR) 15th class was one of only two Double Baltic Garratt classes built, the other class of "Double Baltics" being the Sudan Railways 250 class (which RR later bought and classified as their 17th class).

The 15th class were largely based on the RR 16th class 2-8-2+2-8-2 Garratts. A requirement for a locomotive with a larger driving wheel diameter for higher speed train service on the more level parts of the railway led to the design of a new class. Initially a "Double Pacific" (4-6-2+2-6-4) was considered, but after examining the Sudan Railways 250 class (which were built in 1937), the RR settled on a design with the same wheel arrangement and same driver diameter (57 in or 1,448 mm) as the Sudanese Double Baltics.

Initially four locomotives were ordered, and they were numbered 271–274. These Garratts were built with a "semi-streamlined" rounded front bunker (water tank), that would become synonymous with modern Garratt locomotives.

The locomotives proved their worth, with a high availability, achieving 6,200 miles (10,000 km) per month. After World War II, a further 70 locomotives were ordered.

The 1947 batch of ten were delivered with a modified front bunker, and a rounded rear bunker as well (the first four had a standard rectangular rear bunker). The next twenty locomotives had further modifications to the front bunker, while the rear bunker had been modified to increase coal capacity from 10 to 12.5 long tons (10.2 to 12.7 t).

The last forty locomotives were designated as 15A class. While almost identical externally, they had their boiler pressure increased from 180 to 200 psi (1.24 to 1.38 MPa).

Table of 15th class and 15A class orders
| Year | Qty | BP Order No. | BP Works No. | RR Class | RR No. | Notes |
|---|---|---|---|---|---|---|
| 1940 | 4 | 11115 | 6936–6939 | 15th | 271–274 | Renumbered 350–353; withdrawn by 1975 |
| 1947 | 10 | 11137 | 7228–7231 | 15th | 275–280, 290–293 | Renumbered 354–363 |
| 1948 | 10 | 11139 | 7260–7269 | 15th | 364–373 | |
| 1948–49 | 10 | 11144 | 7270–7279 | 15th | 374–383 | |
| 1949–50 | 15 | 11148 | 7326–7340 | 15A | 384–398 | |
| 1950 | 15 | 11149 | 7351–7365 | 15A | 399–413 | 404 renumbered 424 |
| 1952 | 10 | 11159 | 7555–7564 | 15A | 414–423 | Subcontracted to Société Franco-Belge (2963–2972) |

With the introduction of the 17th class (numbered 271–280) and the 18th class (numbered 281–289), the early members of the class were renumbered to put all of the 15th class into a solid block.

Over the following years there were some swapping of boilers between locomotives of 15th, 15A and 16th classes, as well as exchanges of front bunkers, so it was impossible to say for certain if a particular locomotive is 15th or 15A class (i.e. has a 180 or 200 psi boiler).

== Service ==
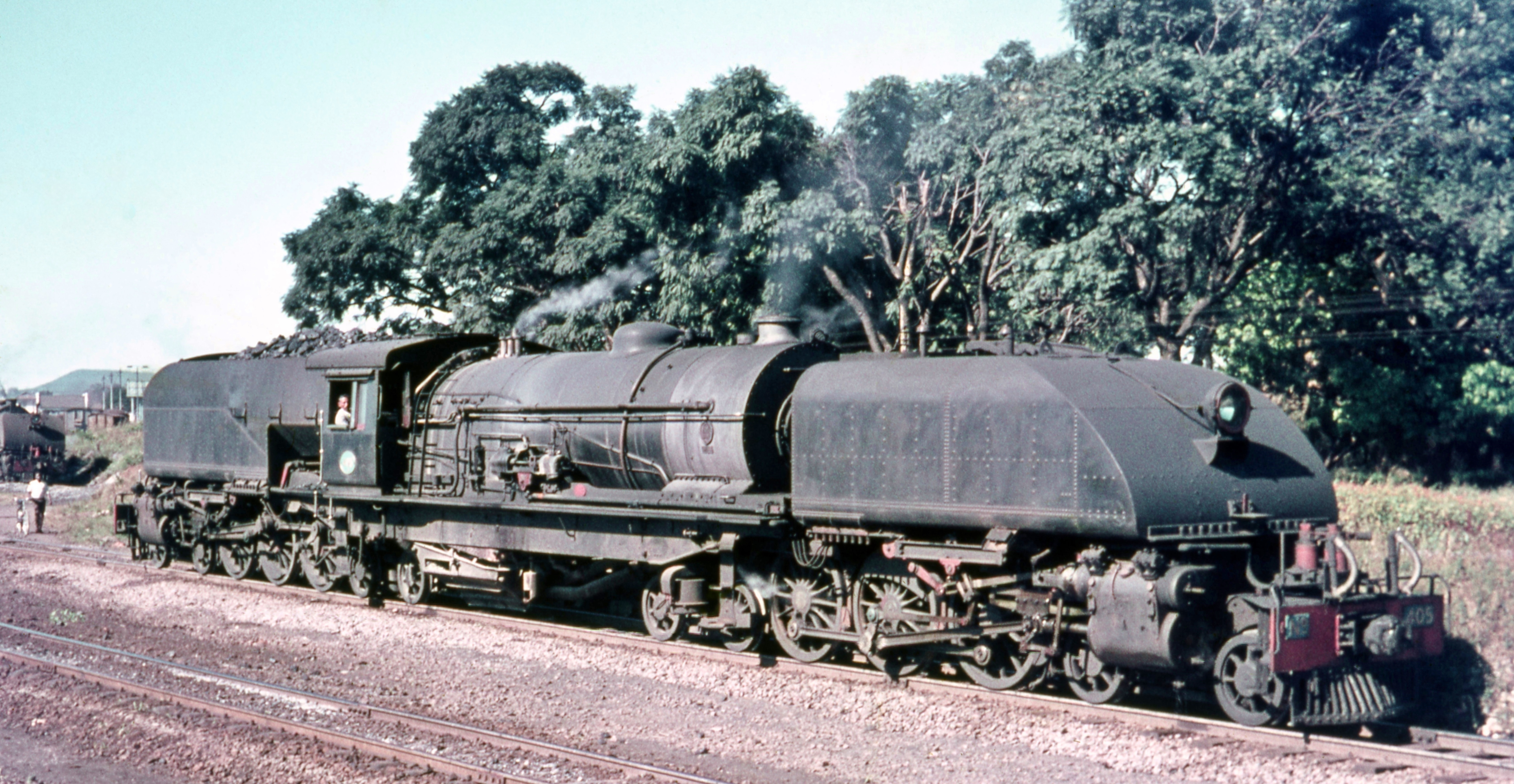
ZR 15th class No. 405 at Ndola, Zambia, 1968

The 15th class were Intended for the 500-mile (800 km) long run from Bulawayo to Mafeking, South Africa via Francistown and Gaborone, Bechuanaland (now Botswana) but this was dependent on the strengthening of certain bridges which could not be carried out due to the war. They therefore worked the Salisbury-Gwelo section and proved their value there, so after the war more were ordered. After use on most of the system, as outlined further, they eventually worked in Botswana after 1959 and reached Mafeking in 1966 when Rhodesia Railways took over operation of the whole system. They replaced the 12th class 4-8-2 locomotives previously used. The 15th class came to dominate the line, to the extent that they became the only type used until the DE2 class diesels were assigned to the Bulawayo–Mafeking trains in 1973. On these trains, the locomotives were worked almost continuously on the 1000-mile round trip, with two crews, one working, one resting in the caboose.

The 15th class were also used on the Bulawayo to Salisbury (now Harare), Bulawayo to Victoria Falls, and Gwelo to Malvernia, Mozambique trains. A few were also used in Northern Rhodesia (now Zambia). When Zambia took over the operation of railways in its territory, only a few 15th class locomotives went to Zambia Railways. Consequently there was no wholesale renumbering of the 15th class like there was with the 20th class.

One locomotive that was renumbered was 404. It ran away on a downhill section between Thompson Junction and Dett (now Dete). It derailed and overturned on one of the many curves near Entuba siding, killing its experienced driver Danny Grace. The fireman, Dutch born Gerard Smout and the African coal trimmer were thrown clear of the engine and survived the crash. The locomotive was believed to be jinxed, and so after repair, was renumbered 424. One of its old number plates became a memorial at the derailment site. It was however eventually stolen.

By June 1975 there were 52 locomotives of the 15th class left in service, all allocated to Bulawayo.

== Rebuilding ==
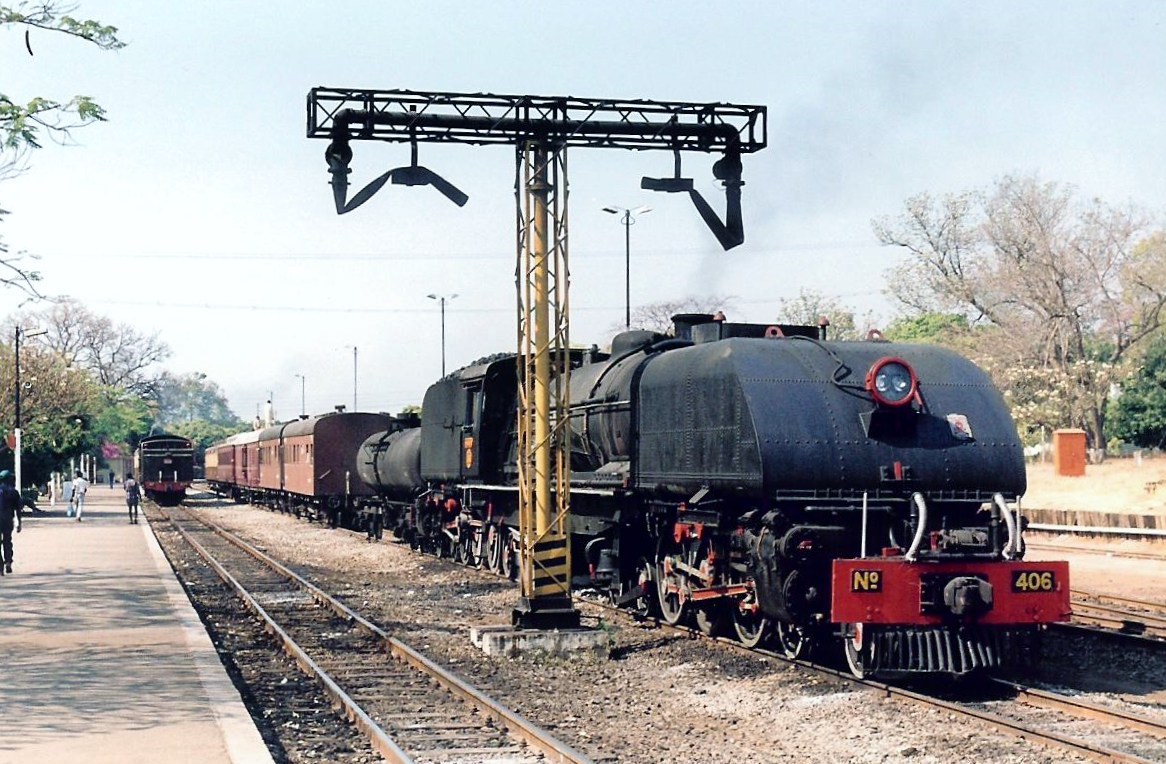
NRZ 15th class No. 406 Ikolo (Hornbill) with a passenger train at Victoria Falls, Zimbabwe, 1997

In 1978 Rhodesia Railways started a rebuilding program for its steam locomotive fleet. Between 1980 and 1983 the remaining Garratt locomotives were completely overhauled and had some modernisation, including the installation of roller bearings. The work was undertaken by private companies, especially the RESSCO works in Bulawayo.

Thirty-four locomotives of the 15th and 15A classes were rebuilt, but locomotives from the 1940 and 1947 batches were excluded. All were given 200 psi boilers, and so with the 180 psi 15th class effectively dead, the 15A class was renamed the 15th class. These rebuilt locomotives were given names of African wildlife:

Table of names of rebuilt 15th/15A locomotives
| NRZ No. | NRZ name | Translation of name |
|---|---|---|
| 370 | Ibhalabhala | Kudu |
| 371 | Inkolongwane | Hartebeest |
| 376 | Ingulungundu | Bushpig |
| 380 | Umahelwane | African goshawk |
| 381 | Ingwe | Leopard |
| 382 | Iganyana | Jackal |
| 385 | Ingwenya | Crocodile |
| 386 | Umyelane | Spring hare |
| 387 | Imvubu | Hippopotamus |
| 389 | Umziki | Reedbuck |
| 391 | Ingugama | Gemsbok |
| 392 | Ithaka | Roan Antelope |
| 394 | Umzwazwa | Brown hawk |
| 396 | Igogo | Klipspringer |
| 397 | Inyathi | Buffalo |
| 398 | Isidumuka | Waterbuck |
| 400 | Imbila | Rock rabbit or rock hyrax |
| 402 | Impofu | Eland |
| 406 | Ikolo | Hornbill |
| 407 | Ukhozi | Eagle |
| 409 | Inkakha | Pangolin |
| 410 | Inkolomi | |
| 414 | Ubhejane | Black rhinoceros |
| 415 | Itsheme | Great Bustard |
| 416 | Inuga | Porcupine |
| 417 | Umathabene | Kestrel |
| 418 | Umkhombo | White Rhinoceros |
| 419 | Isambane | Ant Bear |
| 420 | Indlovu | Elephant |
| 421 | Intundla | Giraffe |
| 422 | Inkonkoni | Blue wildebeest |
| 423 | Idube | Zebra |
| 424 | Isilwane | Lion |

Due to the continuing difficult economic situation in Zimbabwe, the rebuilt steam locomotives remained in service longer than originally planned. Only at the turn of the millennium was the end of general steam operation decided. After this time, the locomotives were only used until general repairs became due. The parked locomotives were then used for spare parts, but have not been scrapped.

In 2006 and 2007 ten Garratts underwent minor repairs and were put back into service, although their use was confined to shunting, suburban and special service trains. The ten included four members of the 15th class: numbers 386, 395, 416, and 424.

As of March 1, 2016, numbers 395 and 414 were still in use, either leased to HCC (see below) or held for excursion / charter service.

== Hwange Colliery ==
The Hwange Colliery (formerly Wankie Colliery) acquired a total of five 15th class locomotives from National Railways of Zimbabwe for shunting and working transfers to the NRZ at Thompson Junction. These were numbered 8, 9, 10, 11 and 12 (formerly NRZ 415, 396, 392, 423 and 370 respectively). As of December 1, 2014, all five are now out of service (with 8 and 9 already scrapped) for various boiler and mechanical issues. The Colliery then rented/leased 15th 395 or 414 for alternate months from NRZ. This continued in principle until September 2018 although 14A and 16A Garratt's were also supplied by NRZ. With this arrangement ending it brought to a close the use of daily working steam locomotives on the African continent.

== Preserved locomotives ==
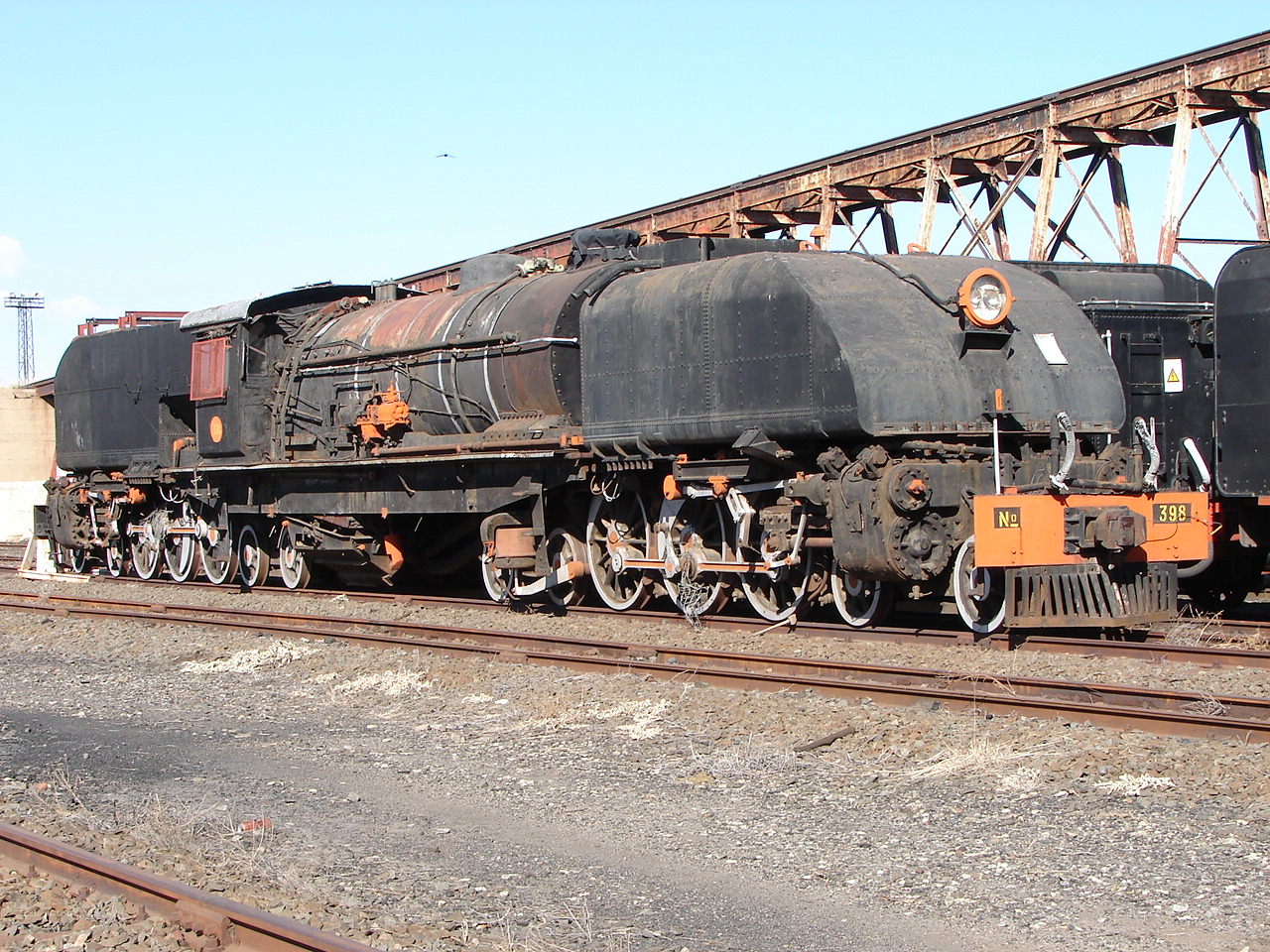
15A class No. 398 in South Africa, 2009.

At least four locomotives of the 15th class are currently museum or monument locomotives, including two of the first four of 1940:

- No. 350 (formerly No. 271) stands with two other locomotives in Kadoma, Zimbabwe.
- No. 352 (formerly No. 273) has been displayed at the Francistown, Botswana, Railway Station since 1976
- No. 398 is now stored at Steam Incorporated's site in Paekakariki, near Wellington, New Zealand
- No. 401 is at the Railway Museum of Livingstone in Zambia.

There are currently no 15th class locomotives in the Bulawayo Railway Museum.
