= Ngungumbane train collision =

2006 railway incident in Zimbabwe

In the Ngungumbane train collision two trains collided at a crossing loop in Zimbabwe.

== Details ==
Early on Saturday 3 June 2006, a 33-wagon mixed goods consist including three fuel tankers ran into a stationary passenger train at Ngungumbane siding, derailing the locomotive and two wagons. Both trains were bound for Bulawayo, the goods (in which four railway employees lost their lives) from Chiredzi and the passenger (in which 1 person died) from Rutenga. Six people were critically injured; eighteen others were hurt. According to NRZ (National Railways of Zimbabwe) general manager Air Commodore Mike Karakadzai (retd), speaking at the accident scene, the driver of the goods train tried to apply emergency braking to avoid a collision but was unable to do so in time. He praised the prompt response by rescue personnel.

Zimbabwe Midlands Governor Cephas Msipa, who also went to the accident site, was quoted by the Sunday News saying he commended NRZ for their quick response. "It is important for public transport operators and crews to acknowledge that they have a duty, apart from carrying people, to save their passengers' lives".

Both trains were supposed to cross another goods train, from Dabuka.

== See also ==
- List of rail accidents (2000–present)
