= Class 16 =

Class 16 may refer to:

- Belgian Railways Class 16
- British Rail Class 16
- DRG Class 16, a class of German six-coupled, express train, steam locomotives operated by the Deutsche Reichsbahn which included the:
  - Class 16.0: the Oldenburg S 10
  - Class 16.0^{II}: the BBÖ 310, PKP Class Pn12 and PKP Class Pn11
- DRG Class E 16
- LSWR G16 class
- LSWR H16 class
- Pennsylvania Railroad class D16
- Rhodesia Railways 16A class
- South African Class NG G16 2-6-2+2-6-2
- VR Class Dr16

== See also ==
- Type 16 (disambiguation)
