= Rhodesia Railways 19th class =

1952 design of steam locomotive

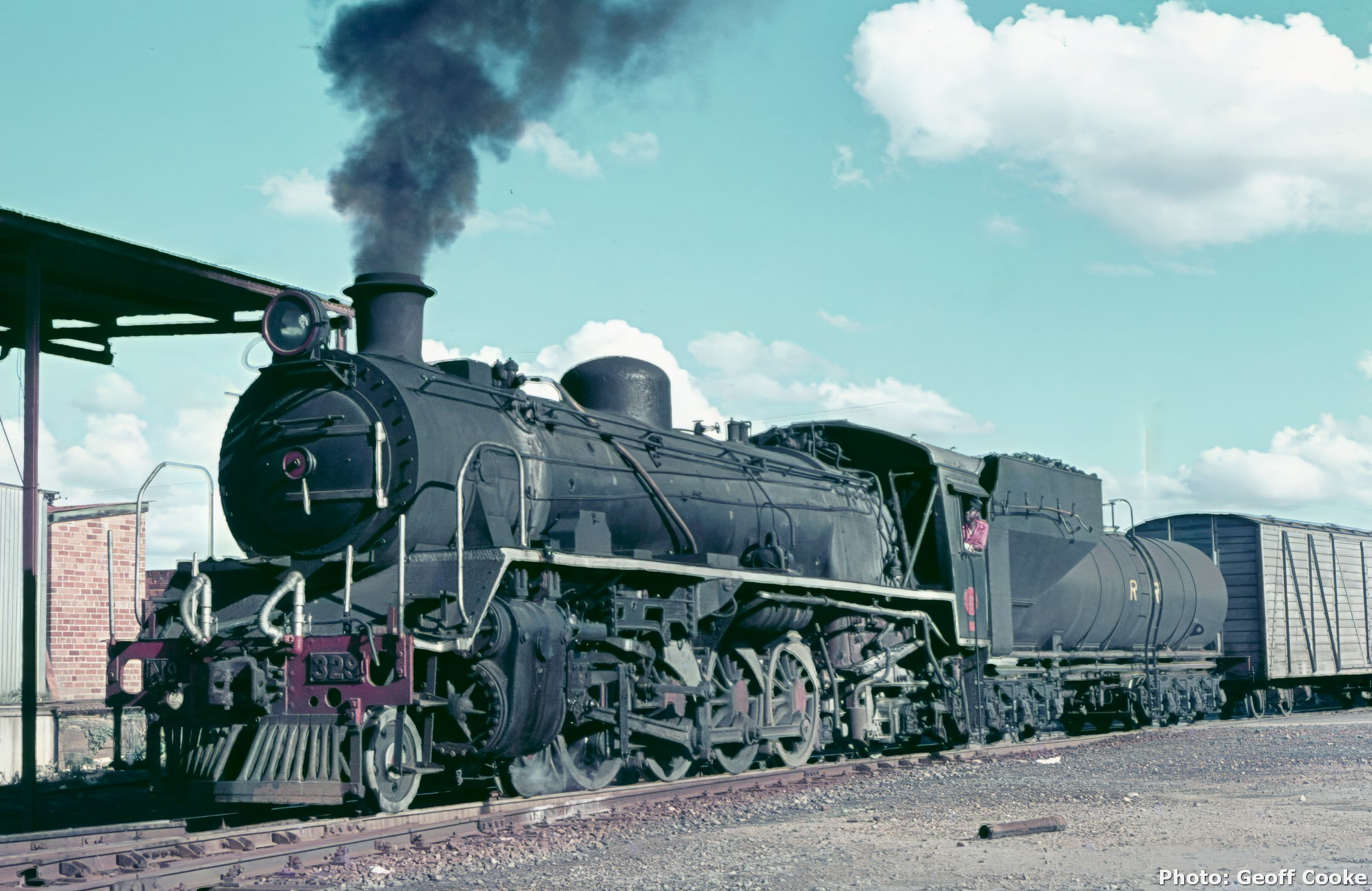
- Rhodesia Railways 19th 329
Type and origin
- Power type: Steam
- Builder: Henschel
- Build date: 1951-1953
- Total produced: 20 (for Rhodesia Railways); 1 (19C class); 6 (for industrial users)
Specifications
- Configuration
  - Whyte: 4-8-2
- Gauge: 3 ft 6 in (1,067 mm) Cape gauge
- Driver dia.: 4 ft 6 in (1.37 m)
- Length: 86 ft 9 in (26.44 m) (with tender)
- Axle load: 13 long tons 15 cwt (30,800 lb or 14 t)
- Adhesive weight: 53 long tons 19 cwt (120,800 lb or 54.8 t)
- Loco weight: 81.23 long tons 18 cwt (184,000 lb or 83.4 t)
- Fuel type: Coal
- Fuel capacity: 12 LT (12 t)
- Water cap.: 6,500 imp gal (30,000 L; 7,800 US gal)
- Firebox
  - Grate area: 36 sq ft (3.3 m^{2})
- Boiler pressure: 19th: 200 psi (1.38 MPa)
- Heating surface
  - Firebox: 1,847 sq ft (171.6 m^{2})
  - Tubes and flues: 1,700 sq ft (160 m^{2})
- Superheater
  - Heating area: 390 sq ft (36 m^{2})
- Cylinders: Two
- Cylinder size: 21 in × 26 in (533 mm × 660 mm)
Performance figures
- Tractive effort: 19th: 36,090 lbf (160.5 kN)
Career
- Operators: Rhodesia Railways; National Railways of Zimbabwe; Wankie Colliery; Nkana Mine
- Class: 19th
- Numbers: 316–335 (19th class); 335 (19C class); 337-338 (19B class)
- Delivered: 1951
- First run: 1952

The Rhodesia Railways 19th class was a class of 20 4-8-2 locomotives built between 1951 and 1953. These were similar in design to the Class 19D used by South African Railways, and were the last non-articulated steam locomotives ever purchased by Rhodesia Railways.

== Service ==
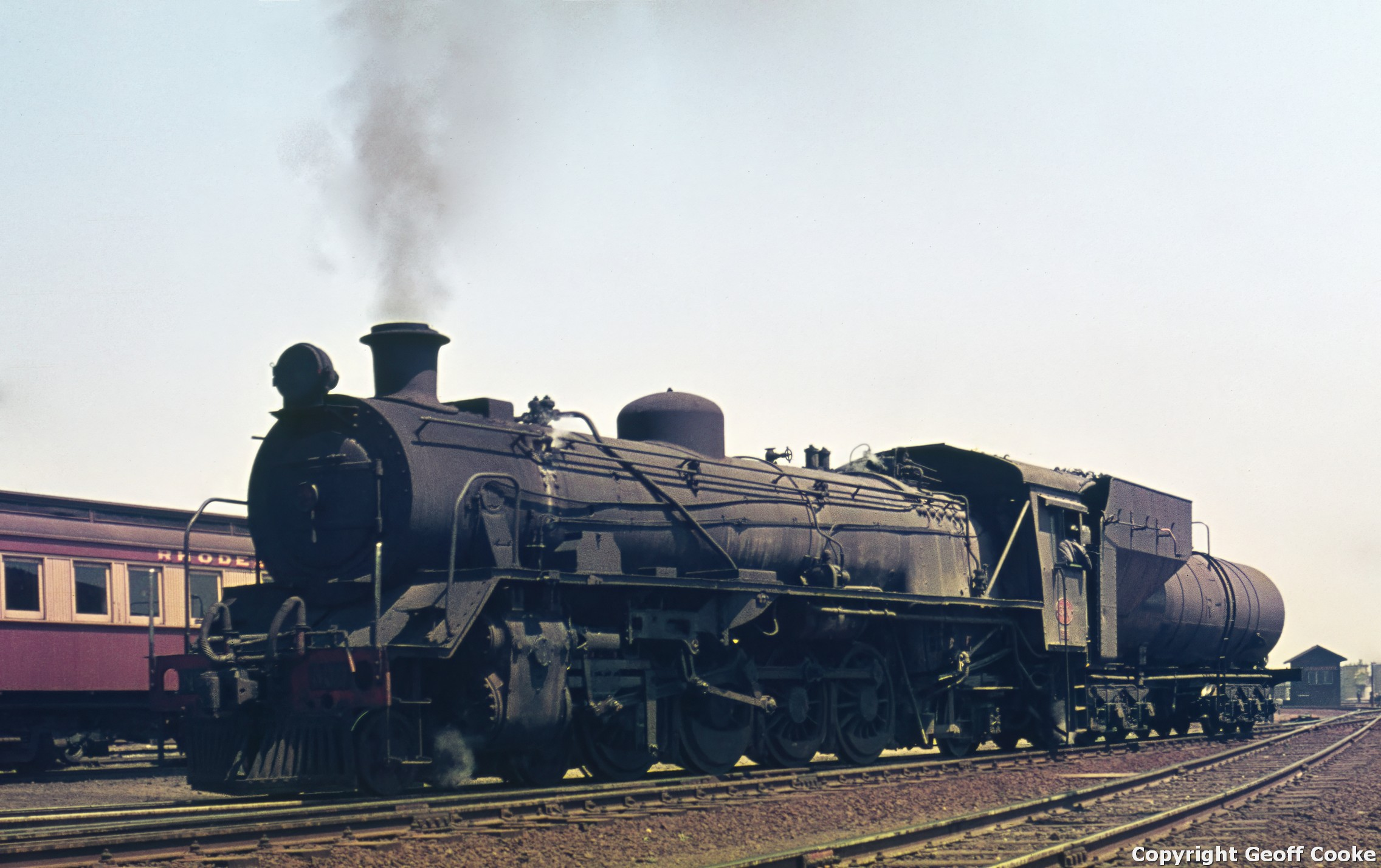
Rhodesia Railways 19th

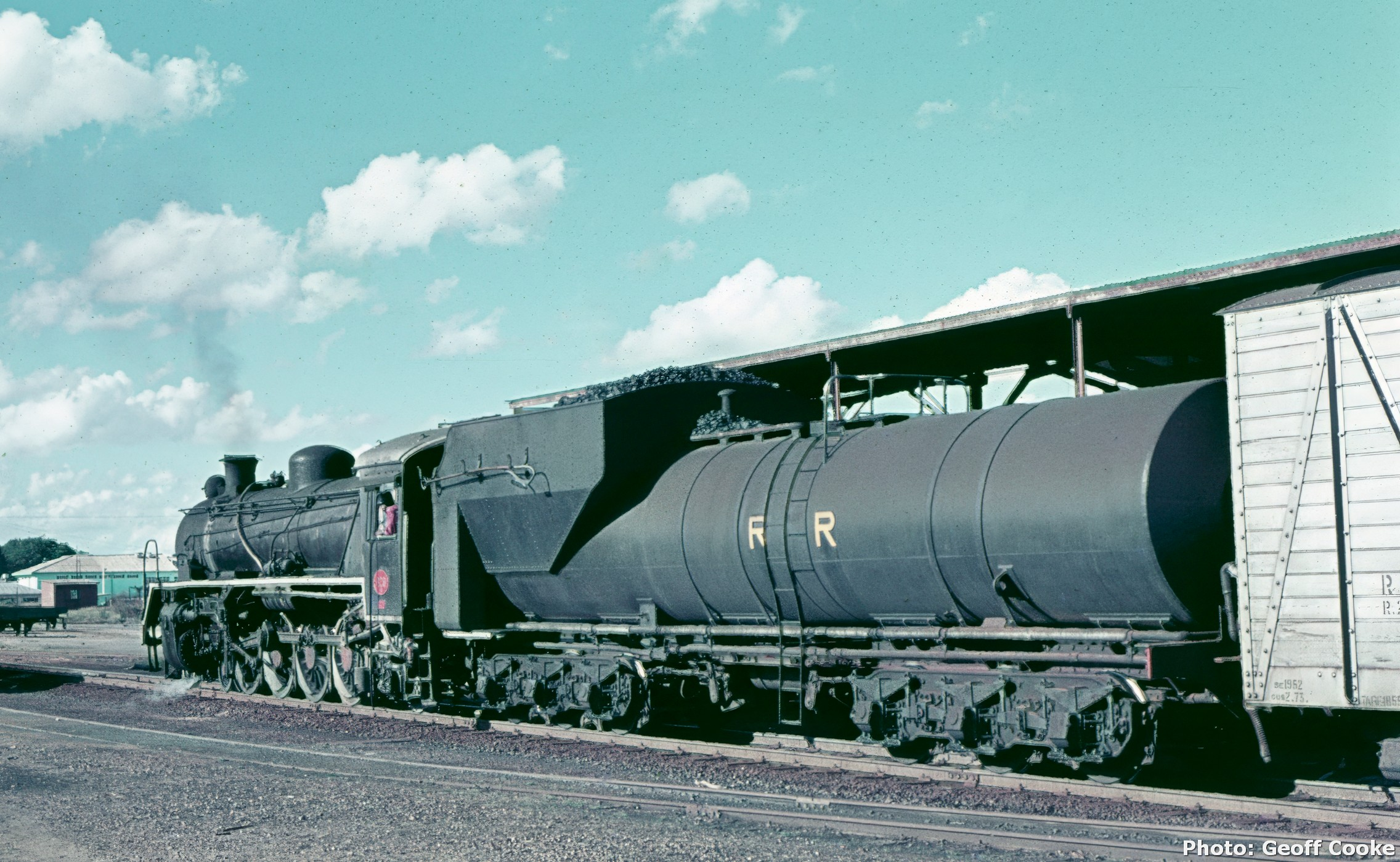
Rhodesia Railways 19th tender

Between 1951 and 1953, Henschel & Son built twenty locomotives for Rhodesia Railways, as their 19th class, numbered in the range from 316 to 335. They had tenders similar to the SAR Torpedo type, but with plate frame bogies instead of cast frame Buckeye bogies.

A single 19C class, no. 336, was built by Henschel in 1954 as a condensing locomotive. Nicknamed "Silent Suzie", it was intended for use in Botswana, but was unpopular with crews, and was rebuilt into a non-condensing 19th Class in 1958 after being involved in a collision. The condensing tender was rebuilt to a Torpedo tender by mounting a tank and coal bunker, supplied locally in Bulawayo, on the frame. This rebuilt tender is the one paired with no. 330 which is preserved in the Bulawayo Railway Museum.

By February 1979, only three were left in service, with no. 328 allocated to the Bulawayo shed, no. 329 at Lobatse in Botswana, and no. 330 out-stationed at Mafeking in South Africa. In addition, a further nine locomotives were in storage.

First Number	Henschel Builder Number	Date Built	Disposal	Notes
316	27386	1952	Scrapped 1976	
317	27387	1952	Scrapped 1976	
318	27388	1952	Scrapped 1980	
319	27389	1952	Sold Selebi-Pikwe	
320	27390	1952	Sold Wankie Colliery	
321	27391	1952	Scrapped 1976	
322	27392	1952	Sold Selebi-Pikwe	
323	27393	1952	Scrapped 1976	
324	27394	1952	Scrapped 1976	
325	27395	1952	Sold Wankie Colliery	
326	27396	1952	Sold Wankie Colliery	
327	27397	1952	Scrapped 1980	
328	27398	1952	Sold Selebi-Pikwe	
329	27399	1952	Scrapped 1976	
330	27400	1952	Bulawayo Railway Museum	
331	27401	1952	Scrapped 1976	
332	27402	1952	Scrapped 1976	
333	27403	1952	Scrapped 1979	
334	27404	1952	Scrapped 1979	
335	27405	1952	Scrapped 1976	

== Industrial use ==
=== Wankie Colliery ===
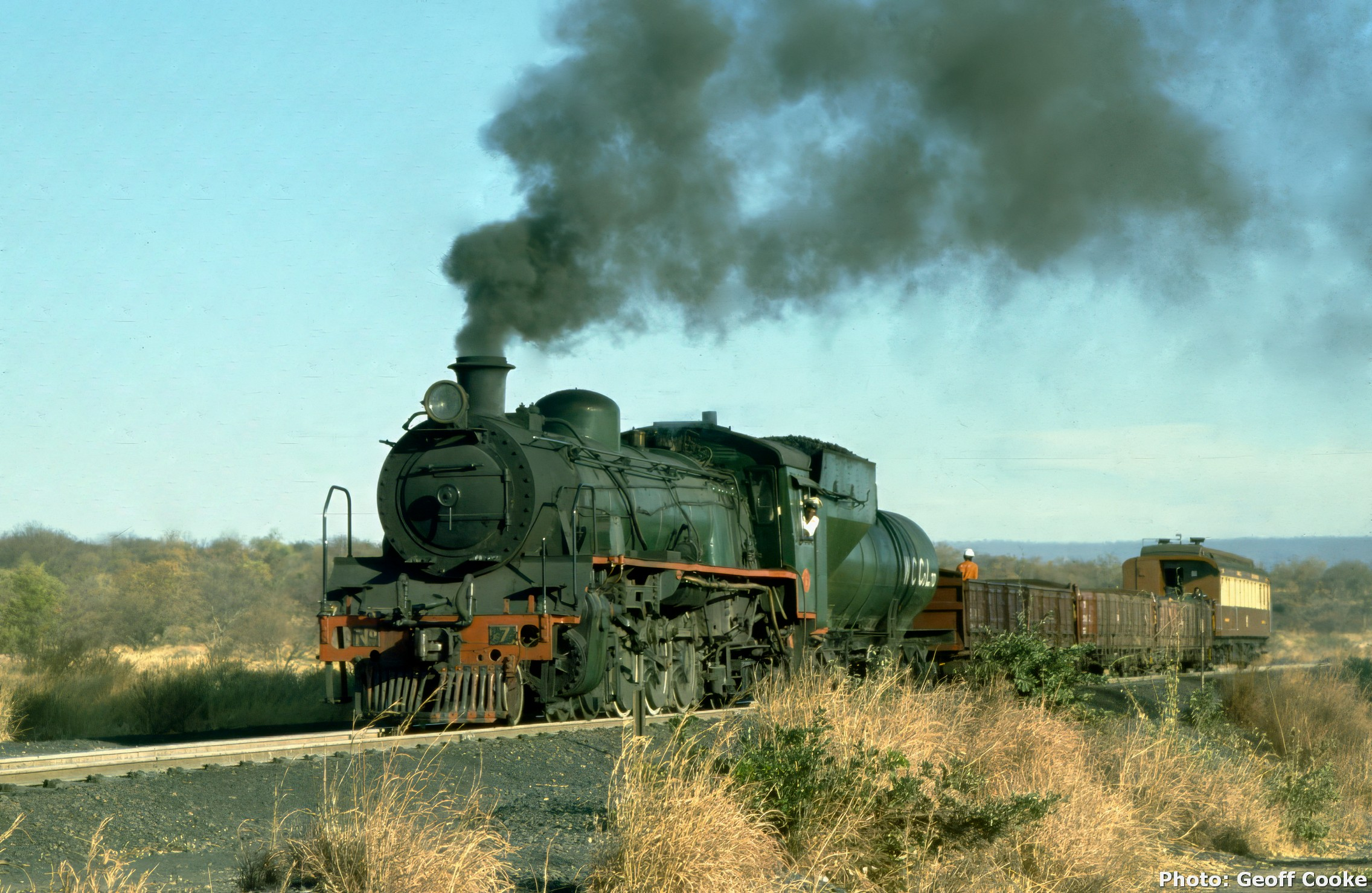
Wankie Colliery Ex Rhodesia railways 19th

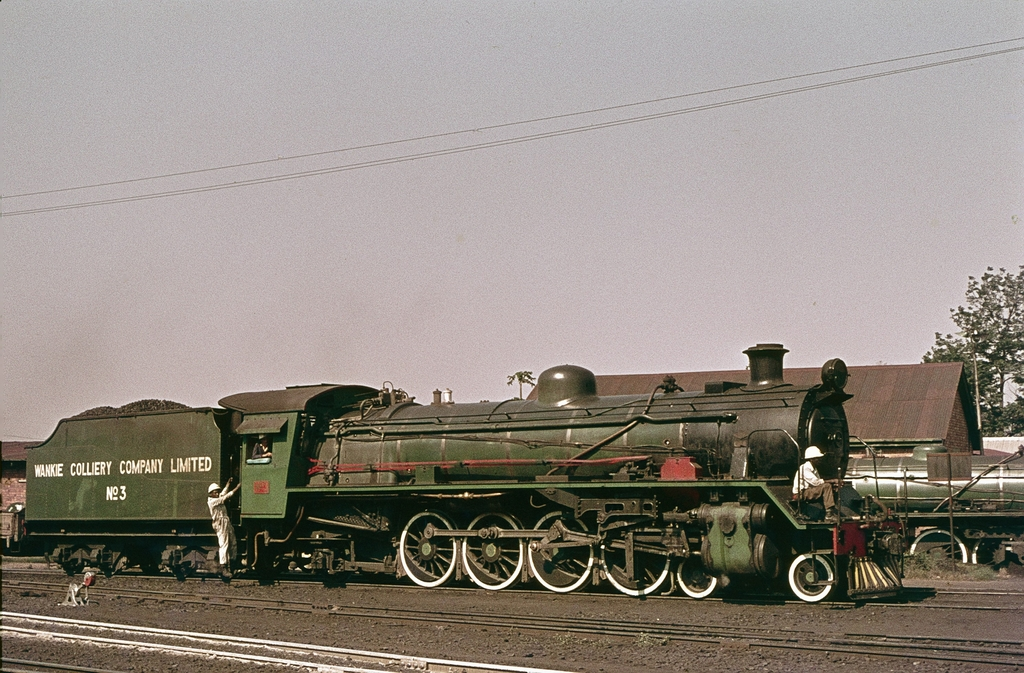
Wankie colliery 19th

At the same time as the Rhodesia Railways' order, the Hwange Colliery (then known as the Wankie Coal Company) was looking forward to cut down expendetures of having the Rhodesia Railways handling rail operations from its mines, which cost the colliery company £50 per shunt.

The company decided to order four locomotives identical to the 19th class for £47,000 each from the North British Locomotive Company. These locomotives differed from the Rhodesia Railways examples by having a 12th class tender, and the absence of a superheater. The four locomotives were numbered 1 to 4. A few of the Rhodesian 19th class were later sold to the Wankie Colliery, continuing off where the four first-hand locomotives left off.

== Bibliography ==
- Durrant, A.E. (1997). The Smoke That Thunders (1 ed.). Harare: African Publishing Group. ISBN 1-77901-134-2.
- Garratt, Colin Dennis (1974). Steam Safari. London: Blandford Press. ISBN 0713707127 – via Internet Archive.
