= Rhodesia Railways 20th class =

Rhodesia Railways 20th class Zambia Railways 20th class National Railways of Zimbabwe 20th class
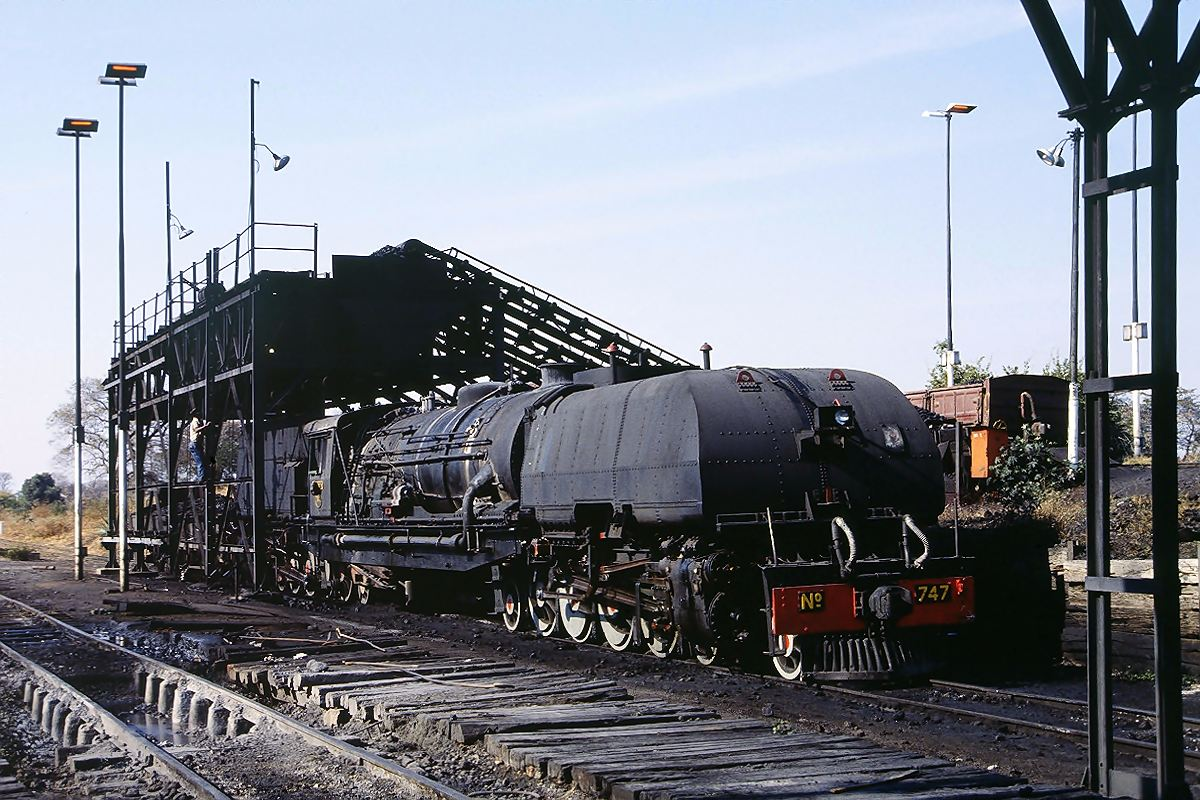
- NRZ 20A class No. 747, at the coal stage, Dete, July 1990
Type and origin
- Power type: Steam
- Builder: Beyer, Peacock and Company
- Build date: 1954–1958
- Total produced: 61
Specifications
- Configuration
  - Whyte: 4-8-2+2-8-4
  - UIC: (2′D1′)(1′D2′) h4t
- Gauge: 3 ft 6 in (1,067 mm) Cape gauge
- Driver dia.: 51 in (1,295 mm)
- Length: 103 ft 2 in (31.45 m)
- Fuel type: Coal
- Firebox
  - Grate area: 63 sq ft (5.9 m^{2})
- Boiler pressure: 200 psi (1.38 MPa)
- Heating surface
  - Firebox: 235 sq ft (21.8 m^{2})
  - Tubes and flues: 2,790 sq ft (259 m^{2})
  - Total surface: 3,025 sq ft (281.0 m^{2})
- Superheater
  - Heating area: 750 sq ft (70 m^{2})
- Cylinders: Four
- Cylinder size: 20 in × 26 in (508 mm × 660 mm)
- Train brakes: Vacuum
Career
- Operators: Rhodesia Railways; Zambia Railways; National Railways of Zimbabwe
- Class: 20th, 20A
- Numbers: RR: 700–760; NRZ: 730–737, 740–750
- Withdrawn: 1970–1992

The Rhodesia Railways 20th class, later Zambia Railways and National Railways of Zimbabwe 20th classes, were among the largest and most powerful steam locomotives in the southern hemisphere.

With 61 locomotives built, they were the fourth largest class of Garratt locomotive built – after the South African Railways class GMA, (120), the Rhodesia Railways 15th class, (74) and the South African Railways class GF (65).

== Design ==
The locomotives have a 4-8-2+2-8-4 of "Double Mountain" wheel arrangement. This arrangement was also used by most other large Garratts.

The 20th class was the first and only class of Rhodesia Railways locomotives to be fitted with mechanical stokers. Other technical features included bar frames and thermic syphons.

The later locomotives were classified as 20A class; the main difference being that the 20ths' inside and outside trailing wheels were of the same size, on the 20A, the inside trailing wheels diameter had been increased in size. The 20As were also heavier.

The 20th class also had the round-ended bunkers characteristic of late Garratts.

Table of 20th and 20A class orders
Year	Qty	BP Order No.	BP Works No.	RR Class	RR No.	Notes
1954	15	11166	7685–7699	20th	700–714	
1957	6	11182	7780–7785	20th	715–720	
1957	9	11182	7786–7794	20A	721–729	
1957	15	11183	7795–7809	20A	730–744	
1957–58	16	11184	7810–7825	20A	745–760	

== The early years ==
The initial use of the 20th class was ill-fated. The locomotives were plagued with teething troubles including cracks in the locomotives' frames and fireboxes. Unlike the South African Railways' GMA, which had cast steel frames, the 20th had conventional fabricated bar frames.

Two locomotives were scrapped very early due to accident damage. Strangely, they were the first (700) and the last (760) built.

Apart from these problems, the locomotives met all expectations. They were by far the most powerful locomotives on the Rhodesia Railways, and were rated to pull 1,250 long tons (1,270 t) up a 1.55% (1 in 64) incline.

== Later service ==
In 1964, Zambia took over the operation of railways in its territory. This included the transfer of 80–90 locomotives – about half of them 20th and 20A class locomotives. This left only fifteen 20ths in [Southern] Rhodesia. They later re-acquired four from Zambia Railways when the latter dieselised.

These nineteen locomotives were 705, 707, 709, 710, 714, 716, 717 and 718 (20th) and 723, 724, 726, 727, 729, 738, 746, 747, 749, 753 and 756 (20A) were mainly used in the transportation of coal between Thomson Junction to Bulawayo and Victoria Falls. On this route they were rated with a maximum load of 1,600 long tons (1,630 t).

In Zambia, the 20th class was replaced by diesels and retired by about 1970.

By June 1975, there were only 18 in service in Rhodesia, all allocated to Bulawayo.

In 1979 / 1980 Zambia briefly placed four back into service due to an oil shortage. One ran with "ZR" painted in large letters on the tender.

== Rebuilding ==
In 1978 Rhodesia Railways started a rebuilding program for its steam locomotive fleet. Between 1980 and 1983 the remaining Garratt locomotives were completely overhauled and had some modernisation, including the installation of roller bearings. The work was undertaken by private companies, especially the RESSCO works in Bulawayo.

Work on the first two was completed in 1980, although it was April 1983 before they were all dealt with.

As part of the rebuilding programme, the locomotives' running numbers were consolidated into two blocks: 730–737 (20th) and 740–750 (20A). Three locomotives kept their old numbers: 746, 747, and 749. At the same time, the locomotives received names; the locally cast nameplates were applied to the cabside above the numberplate.

== Post rebuilding service ==
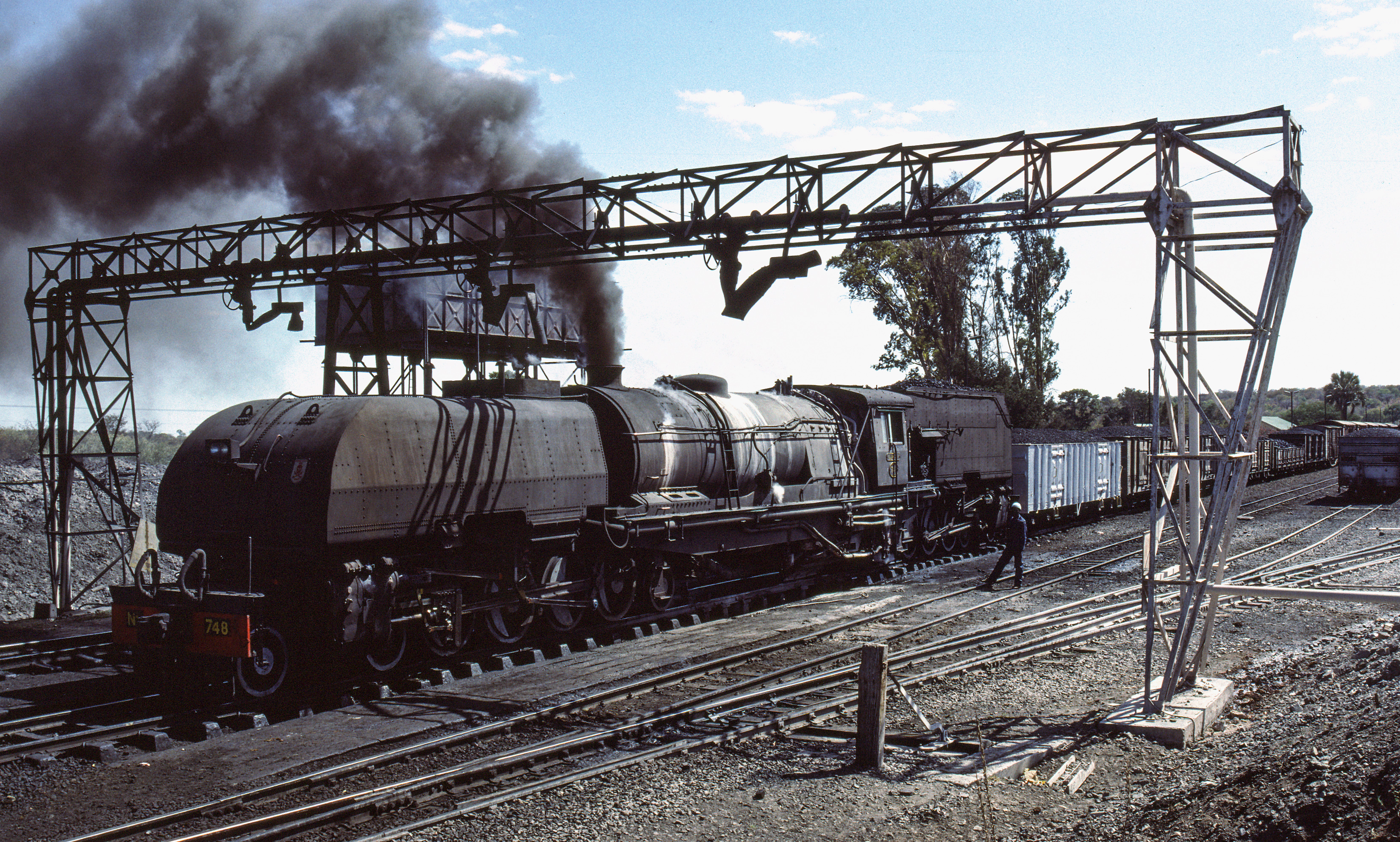
No. 748 Lukozi with a freight train at Sawmills, Zimbabwe, August 1992

All the rebuilt 20th and 20A locomotives were allocated to Bulawayo.

Due to the continuing difficult economic situation in Zimbabwe, the rebuilt steam locomotives remained in service longer than originally planned.

Finally, in the early 1990s, new diesels were ordered and the locomotives were systematically withdrawn as they became due for general overhaul. All were withdrawn from general service by 1994.

All those allocated to Bulawayo with the exception of 730/740/742/749 (retained for museum activity and spare parts) were then put up for tender and scrapped as part of the contract to purchase Canadian diesel locomotives. 736 was later saved, See below.

== Preservation ==
These locomotives survive as of February 2019.

- 708 is in the Railway Museum of Livingstone
- 730 (formerly No. 705) belongs to the Bulawayo Railway Museum where it is on display. It was last steamed in 2004.
- 736 was purchased by tender by the author, A.D. (Dusty) Durrant for US$24,000. It was then stored at Bulawayo Railway Museum. Upon his death in 1999 it was willed to the museum where it remains on display.
- 740 is still in use as a stationary boiler at Bulawayo steam shed (January 2019)
- 742 remains dumped at Bulawayo Steam Shed
- 741 is plinthed at the station in Ndola
- 749 remains dumped at Bulawayo Steam Shed
- 758 is plinthed at the station in Kitwe
