= Sudan Railways 250 class =

Sudan Railways 250 Rhodesia Railways 17th class
Type and origin
- Power type: Steam
- Builder: Beyer, Peacock & Company
- Order number: 1186, 1193
- Serial number: 6798–6801, 6870–6875
- Build date: 1936–1937
- Total produced: 10
Specifications
- Configuration
  - Whyte: 4-6-4+4-6-4
  - UIC: 2′C2′+2′C2′ h4
- Gauge: 3 ft 6 in (1,067 mm) Cape gauge
- Driver dia.: 57 in (1,448 mm)
- Length: 89 ft 11 in (27.41 m)
- Axle load: 12 long tons 10 cwt (28,000 lb or 12.7 t)
- Adhesive weight: 75 long tons 12 cwt (169,300 lb or 76.8 t)
- Loco weight: 168 long tons 16 cwt (378,100 lb or 171.5 t)
- Firebox
  - Grate area: 43 sq ft (4 m^{2})
- Boiler pressure: 200 psi (1.38 MPa)
- Heating surface
  - Firebox: 190 sq ft (17.7 m^{2})
  - Tubes and flues: 1,776 sq ft (165 m^{2})
- Superheater
  - Heating area: 440.2 sq ft (40.9 m^{2})
- Cylinders: Four
- Cylinder size: 16.75 in × 26 in (425 mm × 660 mm)
- Train brakes: Vacuum
Performance figures
- Tractive effort: 43,510 lbf (193.5 kN)
Career
- Operators: Sudan Railways; Rhodesia Railways; Caminhos de Ferro de Moçambique
- Class: SR: 250; RR: 17th CFM:
- Numbers: SR: 250–259; RR: 271–280; CFM: 921–930
- Disposition: All scrapped

The Sudan Railways 250 class was a class of ten 4-6-4+4-6-4 Garratt locomotives. It was one of only two classes of "Double Baltic" Garratts. – the other class being the Rhodesia Railways 15th class.

The ten locomotives were built in two batches by Beyer, Peacock & Company in 1936–1937. They were the only class of Garratts on the Sudan Railways and were numbered 250–259. They were used on Port Sudan to Atbara and Atbara to Wad Madani routes, until they were made redundant by diesel locomotives.

In 1949, they were sold to the Rhodesia Railways where they were numbered 271 to 280 and classified as 17th class. On the RR they were used alongside the 15th and 15A classes.

In 1964 all ten locomotive were sold to the Caminhos de Ferro de Moçambique who numbered them 921 to 930. They were then used on the Beira Railroad from the port city of Beira to the Rhodesian (now Zimbabwean) border at Umtali (now Mutare).

They were still in use into the 1980s, but post-civil war, their fate is unclear; they are presumed all scrapped.
