= Type 16 =

Type 16 may refer to:

- Peugeot Type 16, an early Peugeot model built from 1897 to 1900
- Type 16 frigate, a class of British anti-submarine frigates of the Royal Navy
- Bristol Type 16, a British two-seat biplane fighter and reconnaissance aircraft
- Type 16 maneuver combat vehicle, a Japanese wheeled tank destroyer

== See also ==
- Class 16 (disambiguation)
