= Rhodesia Railways 16A class =

Rhodesia Railways 16A class Zambia Railways 16A class National Railways of Zimbabwe 16A class
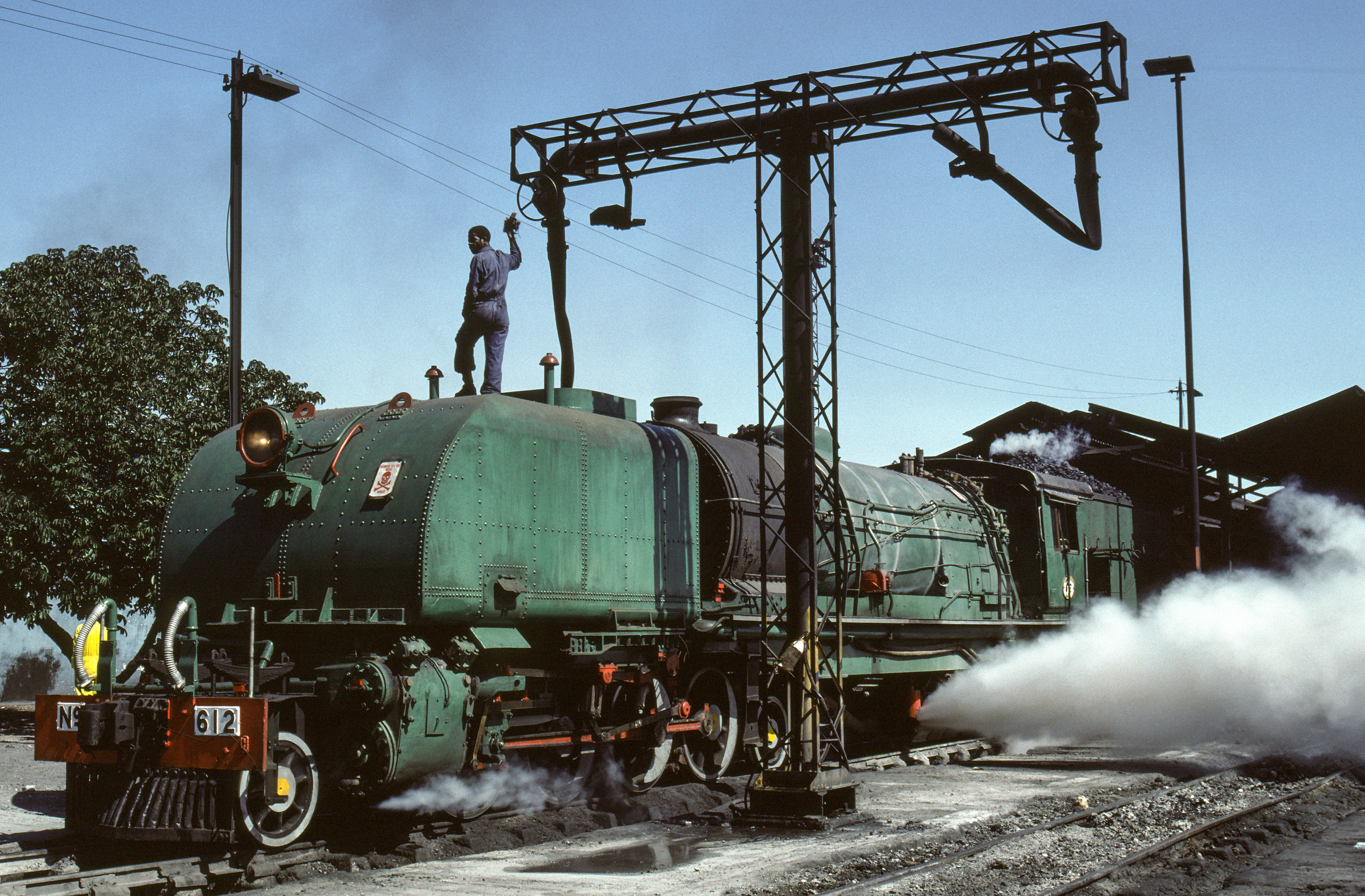
- NRZ 16A class No. 612, at Thomson Junction, August 1992
Type and origin
- Power type: Steam
- Builder: Beyer, Peacock and Company
- Build date: 1952–1953
- Total produced: 30
Specifications
- Configuration
  - Whyte: 2-8-2+2-8-2
  - UIC: 1'D1'+1'D1'h4
- Gauge: 3 ft 6 in (1,067 mm) Cape gauge
- Driver dia.: 4 ft (1,219 mm)
- Length: 82 ft 5 in (25.12 m)
- Fuel type: Coal
- Fuel capacity: 8.5 Tons
- Water cap.: 5000 Gallons
- Firebox
  - Grate area: 212 sq ft (19.7 m^{2})
- Boiler pressure: 200 psi (1.38 MPa)
- Heating surface
  - Firebox: 49 sq ft (4.6 m^{2})
  - Tubes and flues: 2,131 sq ft (198.0 m^{2})
  - Total surface: 212 sq ft (19.7 m^{2})
- Superheater
  - Heating area: 494 sq ft (45.9 m^{2})
- Cylinders: Four
- Cylinder size: 18 in × 24 in (457 mm × 610 mm)
- Train brakes: Vacuum
Career
- Operators: Rhodesia Railways; Zambia Railways; National Railways of Zimbabwe
- Class: 16A
- Number in class: 30
- Numbers: RR: 620–649; NRZ:
- Withdrawn: 1990

The Rhodesia Railways 16A class, will later become Zambia Railways and National Railways of Zimbabwe 16A classes.

== Design ==
The 16A class were a modernised version of the older 16th class. The design was thoroughly revised throughout and externally was notable for the "streamlined" tanks and bunkers, while the cab was widened to maximum possible below waistrail, with inwardly sloping panels above. Internally they had long travel, long lap, valve gear, roller bearings on pony truck axles, separate boxes on most, and higher boiler pressure. This latter gave them a tractive effort equal to the former 18th class, to which they were mechanically vastly superior.

== Rebuilding ==
In 1978 Rhodesia Railways began to rebuild its steam locomotive fleet. Between 1980 and 1983 the remaining Garratt locomotives were completely overhauled and had some modernisation, including the installation of roller bearings. The work was undertaken by private companies, especially the RESSCO works in Bulawayo.

First Number	Beyer Peacock Builder Number	Date Built	*********	Date rebuilt	Second Number	Notes
620	7498	1952				
621	7499	1952				
622	7500	1952				
623	7501	1952				
624	7502	1952				
625	7503	1953		07/1979	601	
626	7504	1953		06/1980	602	
627	7505	1953				
628	7506	1953		04/1980	603	
629	7507	1953		03/1980	604	
630	7508	1953				
631	7509	1953		03/1980	605	
632	7510	1953		10/1979	606	
633	7511	1953		02/1980	607	
634	7512	1953				
635	7513	1953		05/1980	608	
636	7514	1953		06/1979	609	
637	7515	1953		07/1980	610	
638	7516	1953		07/1980	611	
639	7517	1953				
640	7518	1953				
641	7519	1953				
642	7520	1953				
643	7521	1953		06/1979	612	
644	7522	1953				
645	7523	1953		11/1979	613	
646	7524	1953				
647	7525	1953		09/1980	614	
648	7526	1953		10/1980	615	Sold to THF (awaiting scrap Voorbaai 2020)
649	7527	1953				
