= 4-6-4+4-6-4 =

Garratt locomotive wheel arrangement

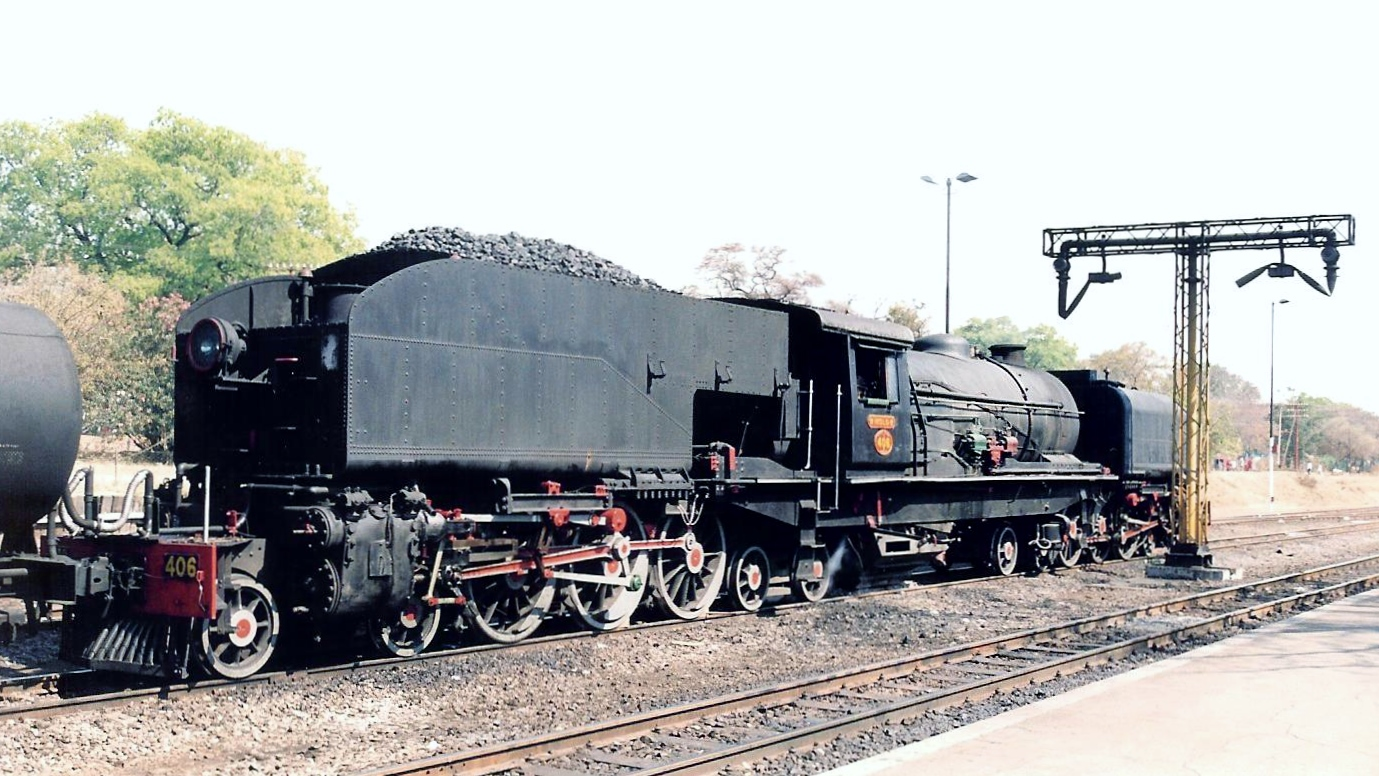
- Zimbabwean 15th class no. 406 Ikolo (Hornbill)
Equivalent classifications
- UIC class: 2C2+2C2
- French class: 232+232
- Turkish class: 37+37
- Swiss class: 3/7+3/7
- Russian class: 2-3-2+2-3-2
First known tank engine version
- First use: 1936
- Country: Sudan
- Locomotive: 250 class
- Railway: Sudan Railways
- Designer: Beyer, Peacock & Company
- Builder: Beyer, Peacock & Company

Under the Whyte notation for the classification of steam locomotives by wheel arrangement, the 4-6-4+4-6-4 is a Garratt articulated locomotive. The wheel arrangement is effectively two 4-6-4 locomotives operating back to back, with the boiler and cab suspended between the two engine units. Each engine unit has two pairs of leading wheels in a leading bogie, followed by three coupled pairs of driving wheels and two pairs of trailing wheels in a trailing bogie.

== Overview ==
The 4-6-4+4-6-4 was the fifth most common Garratt wheel arrangement, with 84 locomotives constructed, 74 by Garratt patent owner Beyer, Peacock & Company between 1936 and 1950 and ten under sub-contract from Beyer, Peacock by Belgian manufacturer Société Franco-Belge in 1952.

Only three railway systems used this wheel arrangement. These were the Sudan Railways with ten locomotives of the 250 class and the Rhodesia Railways, now the National Railways of Zimbabwe, who owned 74, split between 34 of the 15th class and 40 of the 15A class. The Sudanese locomotives were later sold to Rhodesia who, in turn, subsequently sold them to Caminhos de Ferro de Moçambique.

4-6-4+4-6-4 Garratt production list
| Gauge | Railway | Class | Works no. | Units | Year | Builder |
|---|---|---|---|---|---|---|
| 3 ft 6 in | Sudan Railways | 250 | 6798–6801 | 4 | 1936 | Beyer, Peacock & Company |
| 3 ft 6 in | Sudan Railways | 250 | 6870–6875 | 6 | 1937 | Beyer, Peacock & Company |
| 3 ft 6 in | Rhodesia Railways | 15th | 6936–6939 | 4 | 1940 | Beyer, Peacock & Company |
| 3 ft 6 in | Rhodesia Railways | 15th | 7228–7237 | 10 | 1947 | Beyer, Peacock & Company |
| 3 ft 6 in | Rhodesia Railways | 15th | 7260–7279 | 20 | 1948–49 | Beyer, Peacock & Company |
| 3 ft 6 in | Rhodesia Railways | 15A | 7326–7340 | 15 | 1949–50 | Beyer, Peacock & Company |
| 3 ft 6 in | Rhodesia Railways | 15A | 7351–7365 | 15 | 1950 | Beyer, Peacock & Company |
| 3 ft 6 in | Rhodesia Railways | 15A | 2963–2972 | 10 | 1952 | Société Franco-Belge |

== Usage ==
=== Mozambique ===
In 1964, ten ex-Sudanese 250 class locomotives were purchased by the Caminhos de Ferro de Moçambique from the Rhodesia Railways, who had acquired them from Sudan c. 1949 and used them as their 17th class. In Mozambique, they were used on the Beira railway from the port city of Beira to the Rhodesian (now Zimbabwean) border at Umtali (now Mutare). They remained in use into the 1980s, but their ultimate post-civil war fate is unclear and all of them are presumed to have been scrapped.

=== Southern Rhodesia ===
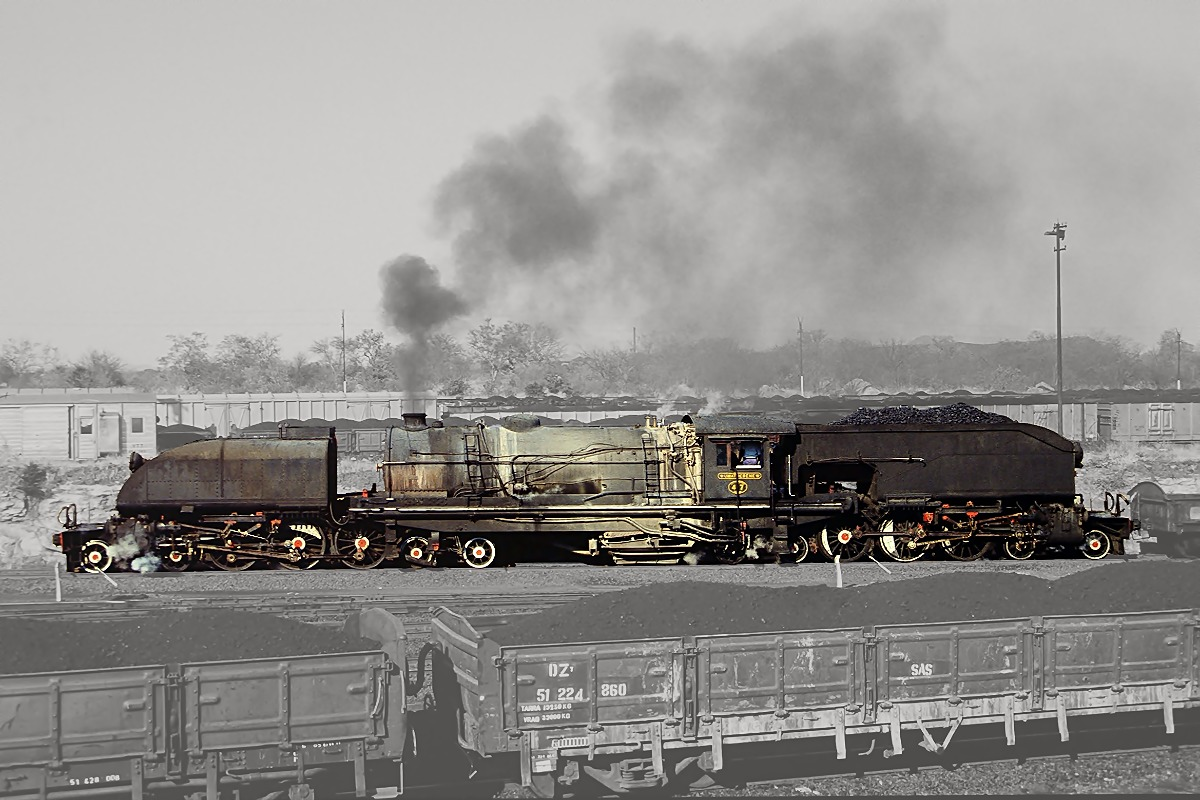
NRZ 15th class no. 417 Umathabene (Kestrel) at Thomson Junction, Zimbabwe

The Rhodesia Railways (RR) 15th class 4-6-4+4-6-4 was the second most numerous class of Garratt locomotives, with 74 locomotives built. Only the South African Class GMA 4-8-2+2-8-4 Double Mountain was more numerous at 120 locomotives.

The 15th class was a development of the RR 16th class 2-8-2+2-8-2 Garratts, to meet a requirement for a locomotive with a larger driving wheel diameter for higher speed train service on the more level parts of the railway. After examining the Sudan Railways 250 class, the RR settled on a design with the same wheel arrangement and the same 57 inches (1,448 millimetres) diameter driving wheel diameter as that of the Sudanese Double Baltics.

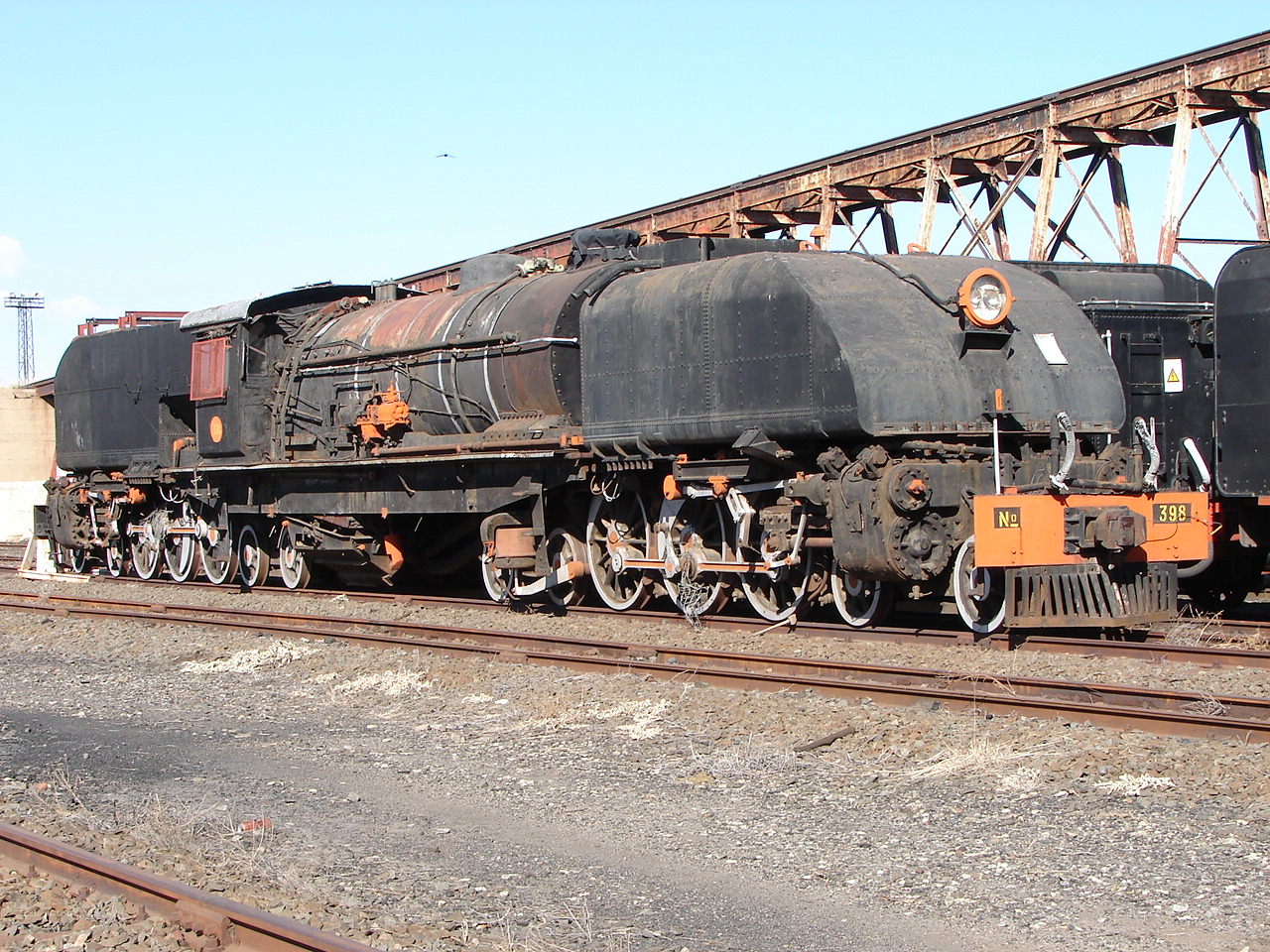
NRZ 15A class no. 398 Isidumuka (Waterbuck) at Beaconsfield, Kimberley, South Africa

Initially four locomotives were ordered in 1940, and having proved their worth, a further seventy locomotives were ordered in five batches after the Second World War. The last forty locomotives were designated as the 15A class, since they had boilers with the rated pressure increased from 180 to 200 pounds per square inch (1.24 to 1.38 megapascals).

=== Sudan ===
Ten 4-6-4+4-6-4 Garratt locomotives of the Sudan Railways 250 class were built in two batches for the Sudan Railways by Beyer, Peacock in 1936 and 1937. They were the only Garratt types on the Sudan Railways and were used on the Port Sudan to Atbara and Atbara to Wad Madani routes, until they were made redundant by diesel locomotives in 1949.

They were then sold to the Rhodesia Railways, where they were designated 17th class and used alongside the RR's 15th and 15A classes. In 1964, all ten locomotives were sold to the Caminhos de Ferro de Moçambique.
