= Dabuka =

Railway marshalling yard in Zimbabwe

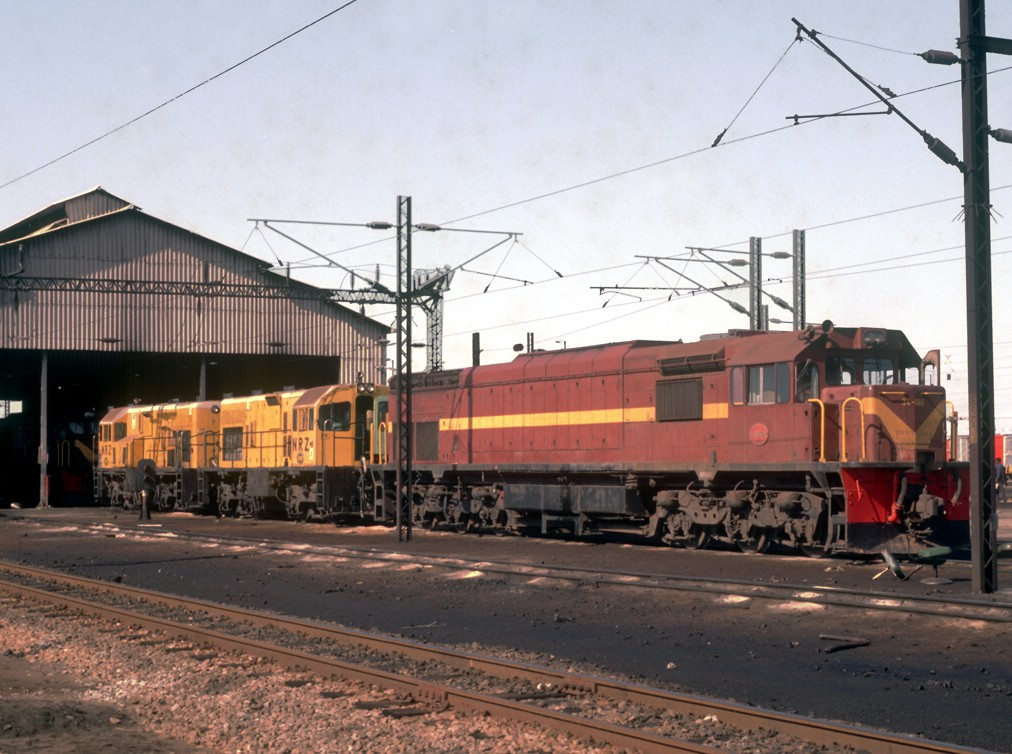
SAR and NRZ locomotives at Dabuka MPD

Dabuka is a major railway marshalling yard in central Zimbabwe. It is near Gweru.

== See also ==
- List of rail yards
