= Rhodesia Railways class DE2 =

Zimbabwean diesel locomotive class

Rhodesia Railways DE2 class
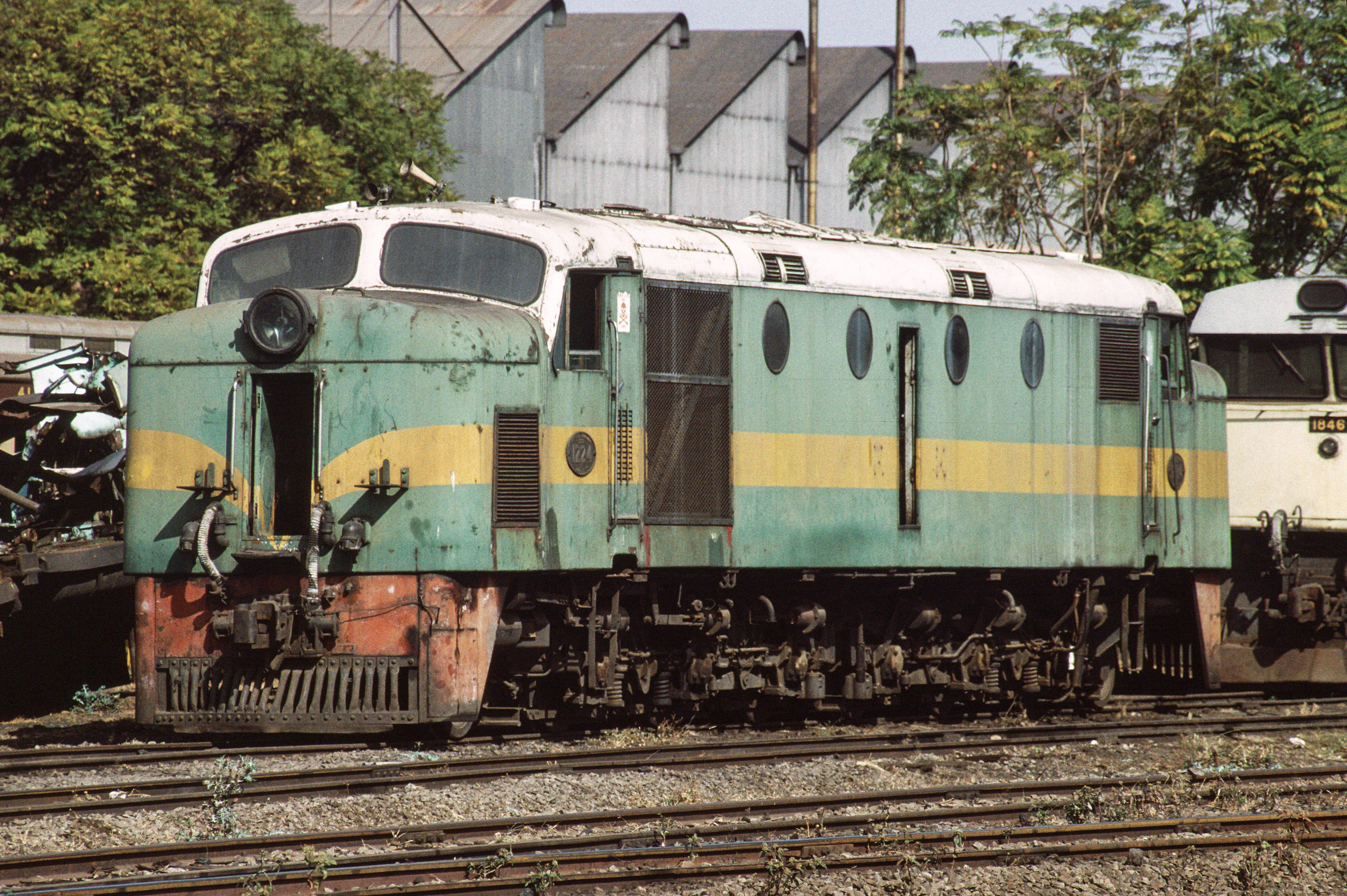
- No. 1224 out of use at Bulawayo in 1992
Type and origin
- Power type: Diesel-electric
- Builder: Dick, Kerr & Company; Vulcan Foundry
- Serial number: 2231–2253, 2492–2503
- Build date: 1955–1958
- Total produced: 35
Specifications
- Configuration
  - UIC: (1′Co)(Co1′)
  - Commonwealth: 1Co-Co1
- Gauge: 3 ft 6 in (1,067 mm)
- Wheel diameter: 3 feet 1 1/2 inches (952 mm)
- Trailing dia.: 2 feet 4 1/2 inches (724 mm)
- Wheelbase: 45 feet (14 m) total, 13 feet (4.0 m) rigid
- Length
  - Over couplers: 56 feet 0 inches (17.069 m)
- Width: 9 feet 9 inches (2.97 m)
- Height: 13 feet 2 1/4 inches (4.020 m)
- Axle load: 15.0 long tons (15.2 t; 16.8 short tons)
- Loco weight: 113 long tons (114.8 t; 126.6 short tons)
- Fuel type: Diesel
- Fuel capacity: 1,000 imp gal (4,546.1 L)
- Prime mover: English Electric 16SVT Mk II
- RPM range: 420-850 rpm
- Engine type: four stroke, four valves per cylinder
- Aspiration: turbocharged
- Traction motors: 6
- Cylinders: 16 vee
- Cylinder size: 10 in × 12 in (254 mm × 305 mm)
- Transmission: electric
- MU working: 10 notch control
- Loco brake: air
- Train brakes: vacuum
Performance figures
- Maximum speed: 55 miles per hour (89 km/h)
- Power output: 1,710 bhp (1,275 kW) gross, 1,500 bhp (1,119 kW) net
- Tractive effort
  - Starting: 60,300 lbf (268.2 kN)
  - Continuous: 36,000 lbf (160.1 kN) at 13.4 mph (20 km/h)
Career
- Operators: Rhodesia Railways
- Class: DE2
- Numbers: 1200–1234
- First run: 6 June 1955
- Preserved: 2
- Disposition: 33 scrapped, 2 preserved

Rhodesia Railways class DE2 are a type of diesel locomotive built in the 1950s for operations on Rhodesia Railways. The first entered service on 6 June 1955.

All were built in England in two batches by English Electric; 1200 to 1222 at Dick, Kerr & Company in Preston and 1223–1234 at Vulcan Foundry, Newton-le-Willows in 1958.

== Description ==
The locomotives were designed specifically for Rhodesian Railways, as their requirements could not be met by any standard design. They have the 1Co-Co1 wheel arrangement, which gives a maximum axle load of 113 tons. They have English Electric 16SVT engines and are fitted for multiple unit operation.

The underframe is constructed from welded steel, incorporating a 1,000 gallon fuel tank, and the superstructure is built with a truss framework for the side frames. The whole structure is strongly cross-braced and includes a cowcatcher and automatic coupler at each end.

There is a driving cab at each end of the locomotive, behind a semi-streamlined nose. The cabs have large front windows and full-drop side windows and entrance door on both sides. Upholstered adjustable seats are provided for the driver and assistant. The controller, brake valves and instruments are located on the right-hand side of the cab. A vigilance control is fitted and warning lights are also provided to indicate wheel slip, blower motor failure, low oil pressure and high water temperature. A speedometer is fitted in both cabs and a speed recorder in one cab. The nose end compartments each contain exhausters and traction motor blowers.

The engine compartment is located between the cabs and contains the power unit, radiators and dust-proof control frame. This compartment has a removable roof panel to allow the power unit to be removed for maintenance. The radiators for the cooling water and lubricating oil are located one on each side of the locomotive and are cooled by a roof mounted fan, driven mechanically from the engine.

The locomotives are carried on two cast steel bogies, each having three driving axles guided at the outer end by a Bissel truck. Roller bearing axleboxes are fitted throughout: those on the Bissel truck are of the cannon box type. The main springs over the axleboxes are of the laminated type and are fitted with auxiliary coil springs. The riding qualities of the locomotive are further improved by each bogie having three spring groups comprising, firstly the Bissel truck axle and the adjacent motored axle and secondly, the springs of the remaining two wheels on each side. Each driving axle has an axle-hung, nose-suspended traction motor, which are connected electrically in three parallel groups, each with two motors in series.

Air brakes are provided and provision is made for braking vacuum fitted stock. Both braking systems can be controlled through a proportional valve. The air brakes on the locomotive can be separately controlled by means of the driver's independent air brake valve. A hand brake in each cab operates the brakes of the adjacent bogie.

The prime mover originally fitted was the English Electric 16SVT, a medium-speed V16 engine. This was de-rated from 2,000 hp (1,500 kW) to 1,710 hp (1,280 kW) due to the altitude and climate. Eight locomotives were later fitted with identical overhauled ex-British Rail Class 40 engines. The main generator is bolted solidly to the engine and the/ auxiliary generator overhung on the free end of the main generator. The locomotive output is controlled by varying the speed of the diesel engine and the field strength of the main generator. This allows the locomotive speed to be varied while the engine speed and power output remain constant.

== Operations ==
A new running shed and maintenance shop were built for the locomotives at Umtali (now known as Mutare).

The first batch of locomotives initially entered service on the line between Mutare and Harare, operating singly on passenger trains and double-headed for freight. From the second batch of locomotives four joined the first batch at Mutare and the other eight were based at Bulawayo. The class later spread across most of the Rhodesian railway network.

Two locomotives, 1209 and 1213, were scrapped after a head-on collision in 1966. Seventeen of the class remained in service in 1991.

== Liveries ==
The locomotives were delivered in a cream and crimson livery, with the crimson later replaced by green. From the late 190s a new livery was introduced of green with a broad horizontal yellow stripe and from 1982 the locomotives were repainted again in plain yellow.

== Preservation ==
Class leader 1200 is now preserved in the Bulawayo Railway Museum, and 1207 at Sandstone Estates in South Africa.
