= National Railways of Zimbabwe =

State-owned railway in Zimbabwe

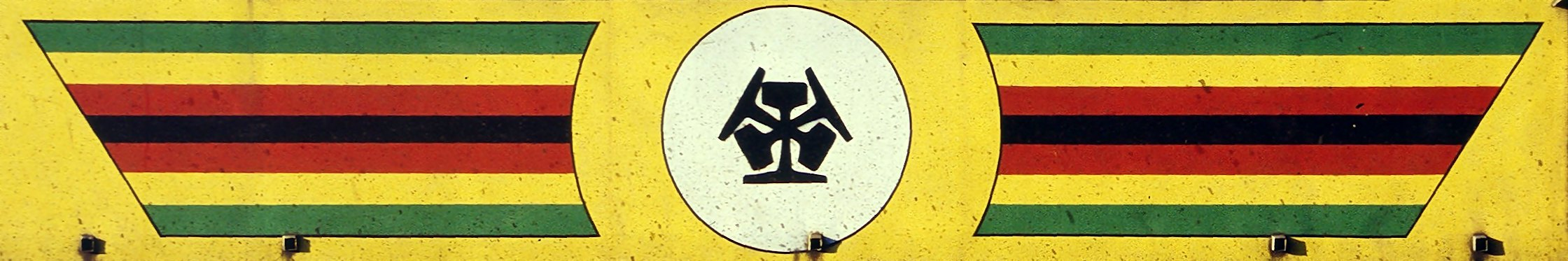

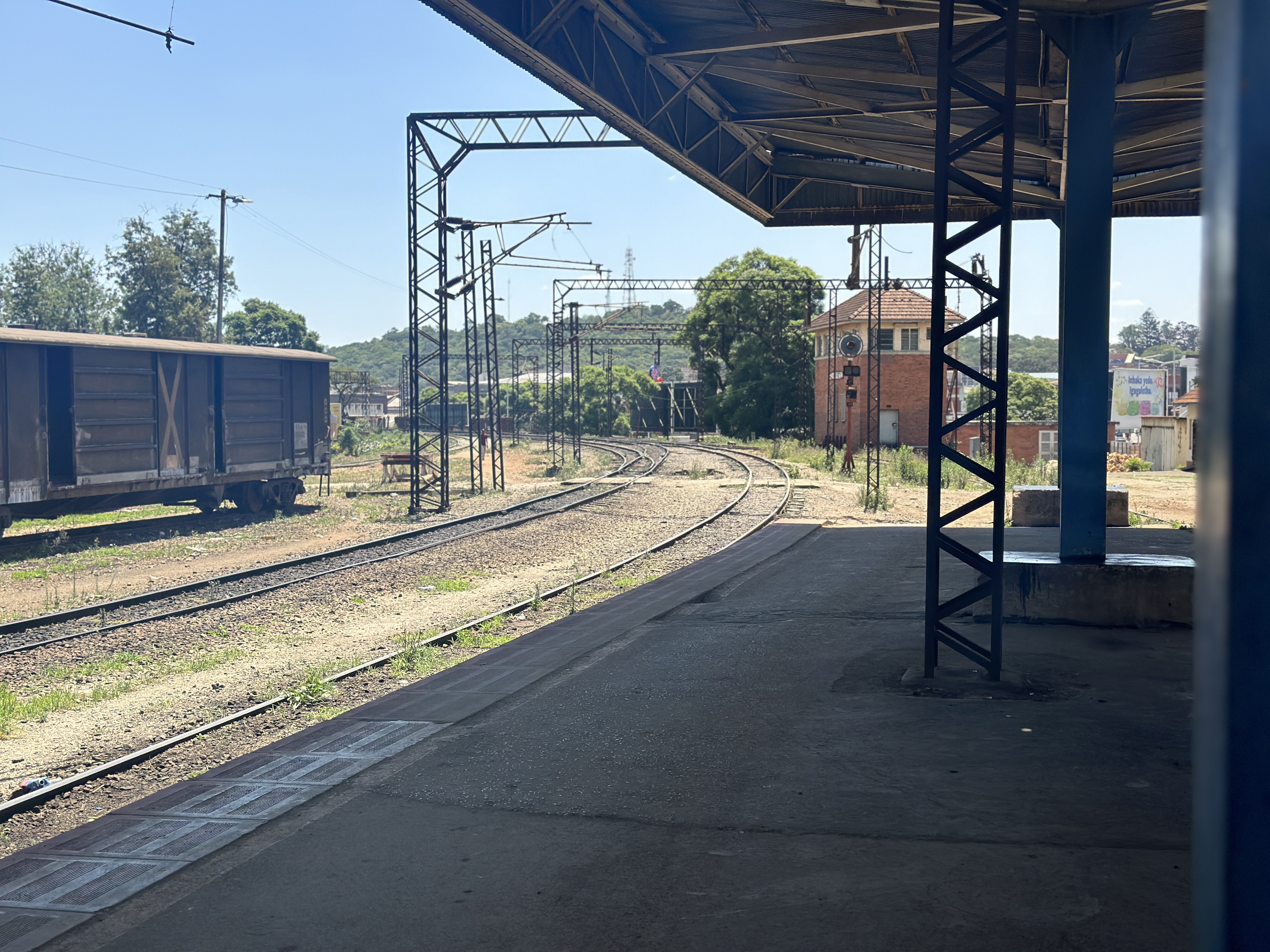
- Type: State-owned company
- Industry: Rail transport
- Founded: 24 May 1893
- Headquarters: Bulawayo, Zimbabwe
- Key people: Lewis Mukwada, general manager
- Products: Rail transport, Cargo transport, Services
- Owner: Republic of Zimbabwe (100%)
- Number of employees: 7,543 (2008)
- Website: www.nrz.co.zw

The National Railways of Zimbabwe (NRZ), formerly the larger part of Rhodesia Railways (RR), is a state-owned enterprise that operates the country's national railway system; its headquarters are in Bulawayo. It was established in 1893 and is governed by an Act of Parliament. It has a commercial-administrative centre in Harare and a supply centre in Gweru. The Zimbabwean railway system was largely constructed during the 20th century.

== History ==
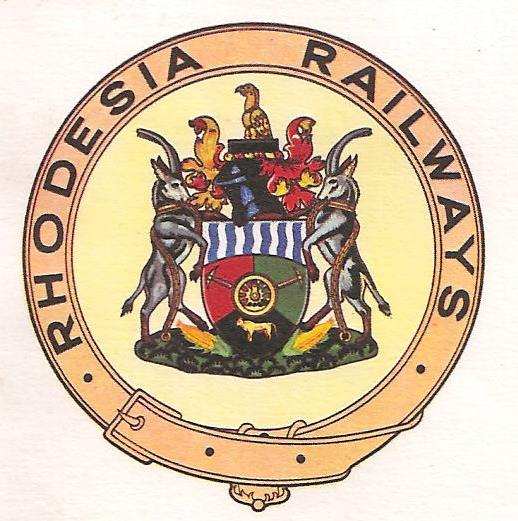
Rhodesia Railways emblem

NRZ's history begins with the creation of the Bechuanaland Railway Company on 24 May 1893. It was renamed Rhodesia Railways Ltd (RR) on 1 July 1899.

At the same time, on 13 April 1897, the Mashonaland Railway Company (MRC) was founded. On 1 March 1905 the small Ayrshire Gold Mine & Lomangundi Railway Company — which had been founded in 1900 — merged with MRC. A similar event would occur with the Beira & Mashonaland Railway (also founded in 1900), which merged on 1 October 1927 with the MRC. Finally, MRC itself would be absorbed by Rhodesia Railways Ltd on 31 March 1937.

In 1938 the company owned 236 locomotives, 2 railcars, 360 coaches and 4364 goods wagons. By 1965 it had 427 locomotives, 11,000 coaches and wagons, and 29,000 employees and carried over 4,000,000 passengers per year.

=== Nationalisation of Rhodesia Railways ===
On 1 April 1947 Rhodesia Railways Ltd (RR) became owned by the Southern Rhodesian government and continued to operate in that territory and Northern Rhodesia and Bechuanaland as well, retaining the name Rhodesia Railways. When the Federation of Rhodesia and Nyasaland was created in 1953, Rhodesia Railways was placed under Federal control rather than under the territory governments. The railways in Nyasaland remained separate.

=== Changes to the Rhodesia Railways network ===
Rhodesia Railways operated the Beira Railway from the Mozambique border to Beira until 6 April 1949 when it was purchased by the Portuguese colonial government.

In December 1959, RR sold the Mafeking–Ramatlhabama section of its southernmost line to South African Railways.

After the dissolution of the Federation of Rhodesia and Nyasaland and the independence of Zambia in 1964, the rail network in the new country continued to be managed by Rhodesia Railways as an asset jointly owned by the two countries. This continued until the network in Zambia was transferred to the newly formed Zambia Railway Board (now Zambia Railways-ZR) on 1 July 1967.

=== Rhodesia Railways 1967–1979 ===
The name Rhodesia Railways continued to be used for the network in the former Southern Rhodesia, now just 'Rhodesia', and for the line through Botswana.

Rhodesia Railways was a heavy user of the Garratt locomotive. In June 1976, 100 of its 109 steam locomotives were Garratts. For operational purposes, Rhodesia Railways was divided into two areas: those lines north-east of Gwelo fell into the Eastern Area, with all other lines in the Southern Area.

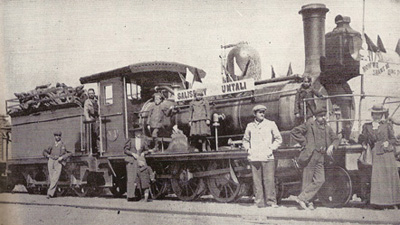
Opening of the railway to Umtali in 1899

=== Founding of NRZ ===
On 1 July 1979 when Rhodesia changed its name to 'Zimbabwe Rhodesia' the Railway technically became the 'Zimbabwe Rhodesian Railways' for less than a year. On 1 May the following year after the Republic of Zimbabwe came into being, it gained its current name, National Railways of Zimbabwe (NRZ).

Rhodesia Railways steam locomotive allocation, 1 June 1975
	Bulawayo	Gwelo	Total
12th class (4-8-2)	5	1	6
14A class (2-6-2+2-6-2)	7	6	13
15th class (4-6-4+4-6-4)	52	0	52
16A class (2-8-2+2-8-2)	8	9	17
19th class (4-8-2)	3	0	3
20th class (4-8-2+2-8-4)	18	0	18
Total	93	16	109

In 1983, the electrification of a 305 kilometres (190 mi) section between Harare and Dabuka began. The first electric convoy circulated on 22 October 1983, with the completion of works taking place two years later.

In 1987, the NRZ renounced ownership of Botswana's interior lines (an act left over from the colonial period), giving rise to that country's state-owned railway, the Botswana Railways.

In 1996, the government of Zimbabwe established a privatised concession to New Limpopo Projects Investments Ltd (NLPI) to build a new link between Bulawayo and Beitbridge, thus providing a more direct rail link with South Africa. NLPI founded Beitbridge Bulawayo Railway Ltd to operate the new link. The line opened on 15 July 1999.

In 1997, the deregulation of the transport industry took place, removing the monopoly of the sector held by NRZ, a fact that led the company to enter into deep decline and accumulate increasing losses.

=== Crisis ===
The NRZ has suffered from the general decline of the country's economy. Neglect of maintenance, lacking spare parts, and overdue replacement of equipment have led to a situation were only part of the network is in good condition and equipment problems have led to reduced service. Steam locomotives have been reintroduced since 2004 as coal is in relatively good supply, while diesel must be imported and electricity shortages are common. Further, the company is seriously indebted, making it impossible to solve this situation without external help. Goods transport has declined, from 18 million tonnes in 1998 to 2 million tonnes in 2010.

In 2019, it was reported that train drivers were resorting to using WhatsApp messages to communicate, due to the unreliability of signalling and control systems. At this time NRZ operated around 100 locomotives and a 'few hundred' carriages.

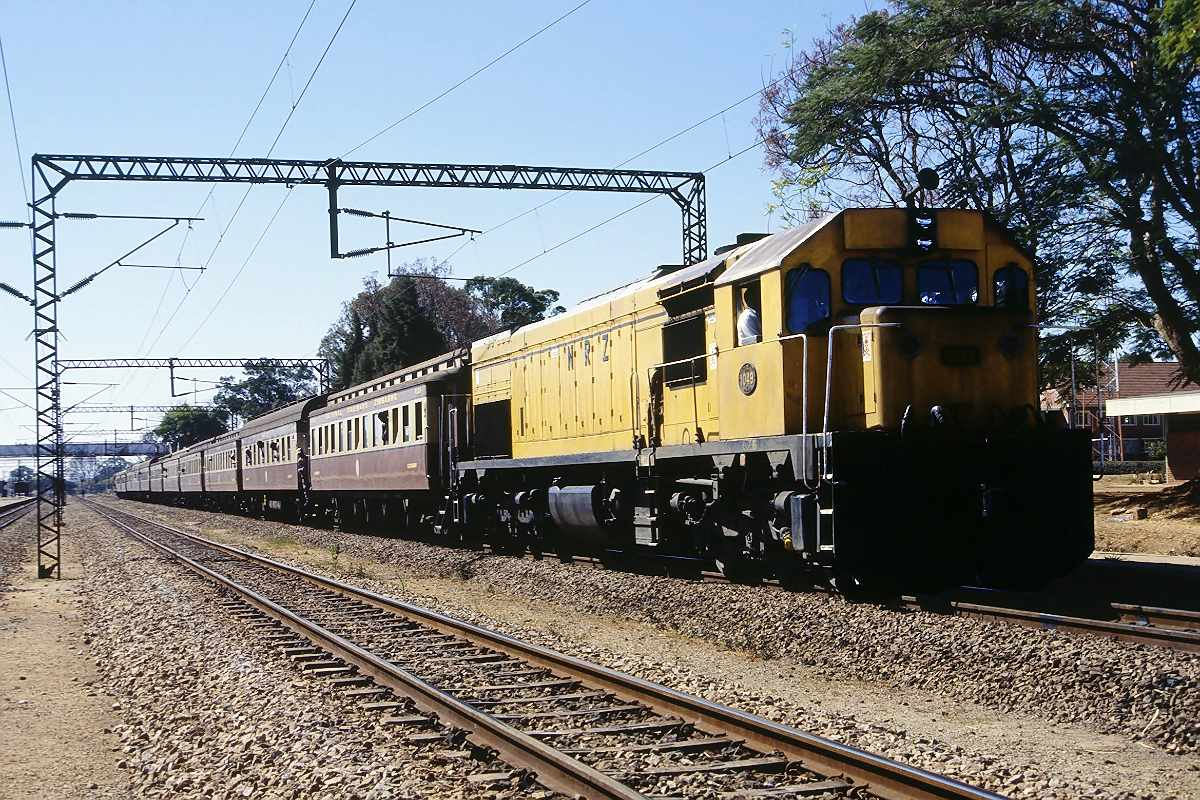
A diesel hauled service, near Gweru. Note the electrical overhead catenary, no longer in use. Photo from 1990.

By 2009, the 313 kilometres (194 mi) electrified section between Harare and Gweru/Dabuka was inoperable due to years of maintenance neglect and theft of overhead line equipment. Diesel locomotives now operate on the route.

=== Recent history and recapitalisation ===
Between 2001 and 2006 a commuter rail service operated in Harare and Bulawayo. Three lines were operated in Harare and two in Bulawayo. They were nicknamed 'Freedom Trains.

Between May and July 2017, a bidding process for the recapitalisation/privatisation of the company was initiated. Six companies successfully submitted their proposals. The winner of the process was the Diaspora Infrastructure Development Group (DIDG), a consortium of Zimbabwean and South African companies. Subsequently, the bid was cancelled due to irregularities.

In November 2018 a commuter service was revived in Bulawayo with one line.

In 2021, commuter rail service in Harare was started in cooperation with ZUPCO, the local bus company, operating three routes to Tynwald, Mufakose and Ruwa. In November 2022, approximately a year after being introduced, they were suspended again due to a payment dispute with ZUPCO.

In 2020, all passenger services were suspended due to the COVID-19 pandemic.

As of May 2023, passenger services have not been reintroduced. NRZ cites the age and state of repair of passenger carriages, as well as speed restrictions on some sections of track as the reason for the continued suspension, although are looking to reintroduce services at some point in the future.

== Operations ==
NRZ operates about 4,225 km (2,600 miles) of railway lines, all 3 ft 6 in (1,067 mm) gauge, providing freight services. This gauge is common for most countries in southern Africa.

NRZ has an important transit function in the southern part of Africa and is well linked with neighbouring countries: toward the north, at Victoria Falls the system links to the Zambia Railways, crossing the Victoria Falls Bridge. To the east, the system links to the Mozambique Ports and Railways. A second line toward Mozambique reaches Maputo. To the west, a connecting line link ups to Botswana Railways to reach South Africa, eventually reaching Durban and Cape Town. A direct line to South Africa from Bulawayo was opened in 1999 by the Beitbridge Bulawayo Railway.

As of September 2025, no passenger services are operated by the National Railways of Zimbabwe. A small number of tourist trains are operated from Victoria Falls station, including a luxury long-distance service to Pretoria, South Africa by Rovos Rail. Some heritage steam trains are also operated on track in the vicinity of Victoria Falls. In September 2025, NRZ operated charter tourist trains between Harare and Mutare.

Prior to 2020, the following passenger services were operated:

- Harare-Bulawayo
- Harare-Mutare
- Bulawayo-Victoria Falls
- Bulawayo-Chiredzi
- Bulawayo-Chicualacuala

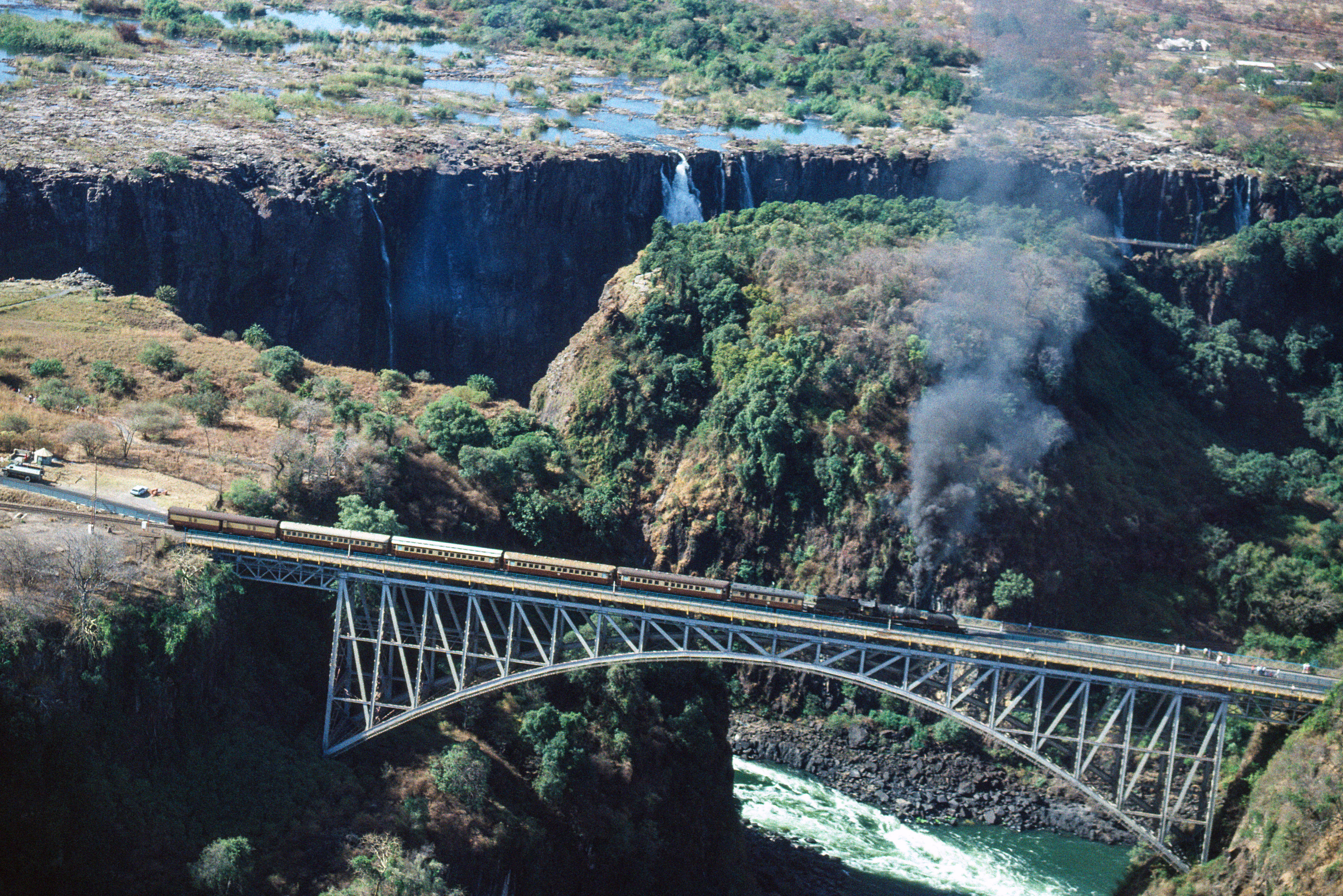
Steam train crossing Victoria Falls Bridge in 1992.

=== Steam ===
Steam locomotives are still used in Zimbabwe; they have proven so popular with tourists that there are plans to refurbish several more steam locomotives. However, funding is constrained, and diesel-hauled freight transport is a higher priority. Some steam train excursions operate as of 2023 in the vicinity of Victoria Falls.

== Major accidents ==
- On 27 August 2006 more than 60 people were killed in a head-on collision between a passenger train and a freight train 30 kilometres (19 mi) south of Victoria Falls.
- On 3 June 2006 five fatalities occurred in the Ngungumbane rail crash.
- On 1 February 2003 40 people died in the Dete train crash.

== Major lines and stations ==
Line	Stations	Notes
Victoria Falls – Plumtree	Victoria Falls – Bulawayo section: Victoria Falls; Thomson Junction; Hwange; Dete; Bulawayo; Bulawayo – Plumtree section: Bulawayo; Marula; Plumtree, border to Francistown, Botswana	Part of Cape to Cairo Railway; Link from Victoria Falls to Zambia Railways, Zambia. The charge was $60 for the sleeper class, $50 for the standard class and $40 for the economy class. Part of the line is in Botswana; Connects further to Mahikeng, South Africa. In 1911 Rhodesia Railways was granted a special agreement to preserve its rights of access under the Tati Concessions Land Act, which formally annexed a former territory of Matabeleland, an area including Francistown, to the Bechuanaland Protectorate.
Beira–Bulawayo railway	Bulawayo – Harare section: Bulawayo; Somabhula; Mbizi; Chiredzi; Sango; Chicualacuala; Gweru; Masvingo; Kwekwe; Kadoma; Chegutu; Harare; Harare – Mutare section: Marondera; Macheke; Rusape; Nyazura; Mutare,	Link from Mutare to Port of Beira, Mozambique. The Harare-Mutare route was the busiest route. The sleeper class was $40, whilst the standard class is $30 and the economy class $25. Link from Somabhula to Port of Maputo, Mozambique; The charge was $60 for the sleper class, $50 for the standard class and $40 for the economy class.
Harare – Shamva/Kildonan/Zawi	Harare; Shamva; Maryland, Zimbabwe; Kildonan; Zawi	
Limpopo railway	Somabhula; Zvishavane; Rutenga; Mbizi; Sango/Nyangambe	Link from Chicualacuala to Maputo, Mozambique. Link from Harare and Bulawayo, via Beira–Bulawayo railway
Beitbridge Bulawayo Railway (privately owned)		Connects to Beitbridge, South Africa. The privately owned Beitbridge Bulawayo Railway (BBR) provides a direct rail link to South Africa. This railway was opened in 1999 and will become part of the NRZ after 30 years.

== Museum ==
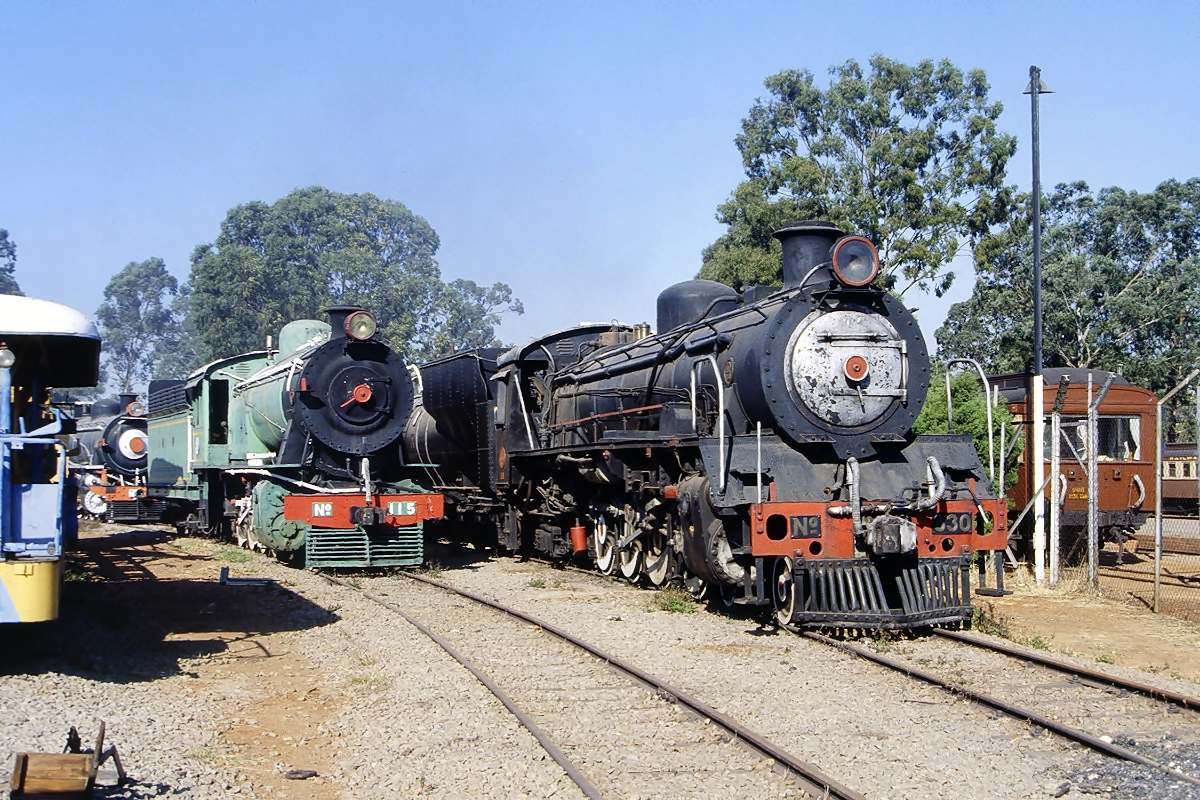
Steam locomotives of different classes at the museum area (1990)

The Zimbabwe National Railways Museum is in Bulawayo; it has a selection of locomotives, railway carriages and other interesting things. One of the exhibits is a Rhodesia Railways class DE2 diesel locomotive.

== People ==
- Former Zimbabwe Vice President Joshua Nkomo worked there as a social worker in 1948.
- Sir Roy Welensky, the last Prime Minister of the Federation of Rhodesia and Nyasaland, worked as an engine driver for Rhodesia Railways before entering politics.
- Frank Edward Hough, Esq., O.B.E., was Chief Mechanical Engineer for Rhodesia Railways, from which he was appointed a C.B.E. in 1953.

== See also ==
- Transport in Zimbabwe
- History of Zimbabwe

== Sources ==
- Burrett, Robert; Murray, Gordon (2020). Iron Spine & Ribs: The Railways of south Central Africa. Durham, NC: Lulu Press. ISBN 9781716477102.
- Durrant, A E (1997). The Smoke that Thunders. Harare: African Pub. Group. ISBN 1779011342.
- Hamer, Edward D (1983). Steam locomotives of Rhodesia Railways: the story of steam 1892–1979. Malmö: Stenvalls. ISBN 9172660775.
- Hamer, Edward D (2001). Locomotives of Zimbabwe and Botswana. Malmö: Stenvalls. ISBN 9172661526.
- Robinson, Neil (2009). World Rail Atlas and Historical Summary. Volume 7: North, East and Central Africa. Barnsley, UK: World Rail Atlas Ltd. ISBN 978-954-92184-3-5.
- Shepherd, Gordon (2018). Old Zimbabwe's Railways and More. Catrine, Mauchline, Scotland: Stenlake Publishing. ISBN 9781840338119.
- Turk, Andrew (February 1976). "Garratts Galore". Railway World. Shepperton, Surrey: Ian Allan: 76–78.
