= Bulawayo Railway Museum =

Railway museum in Bulawayo, Zimbabwe

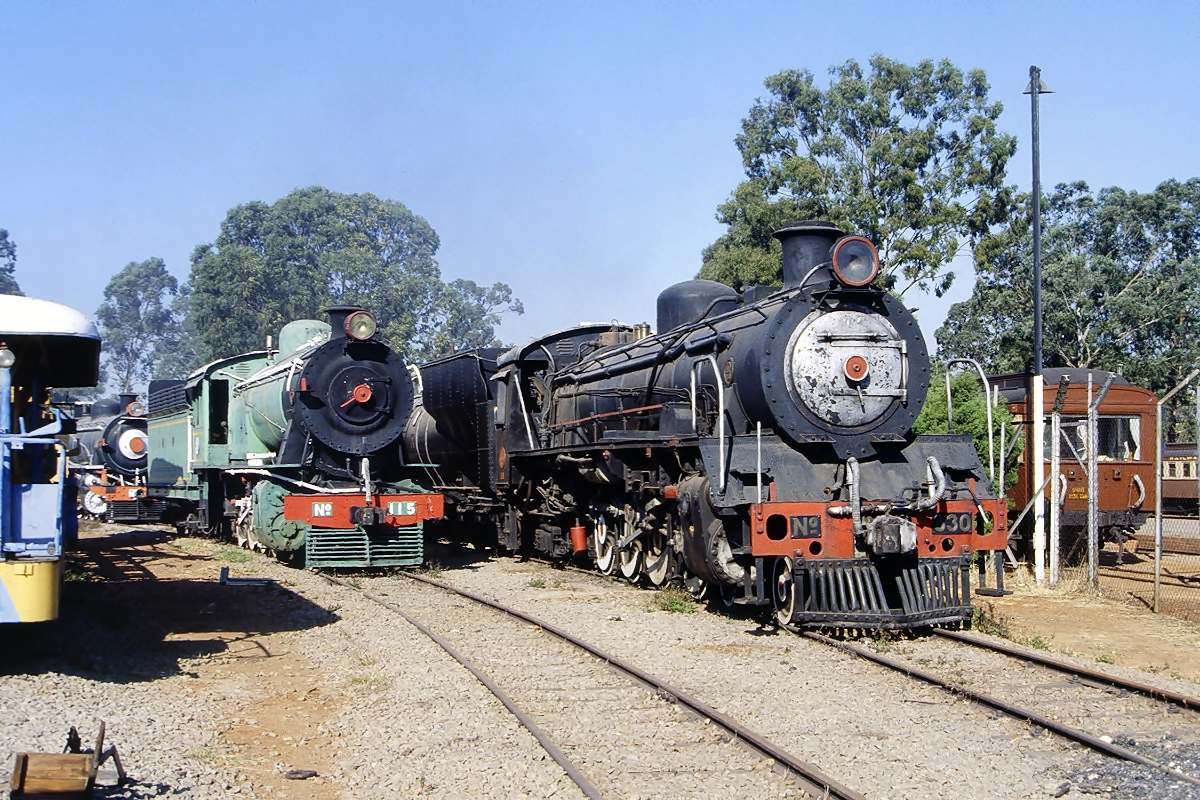
- Steam locomotives at the museum in 1990
- Established: 1972
- Location: Bulawayo, Zimbabwe
- Coordinates: 20°09′49″S 28°34′27″E
- Collections: Steam Locomotives, Diesel electric locomotives, coaches, saloons, wagons, trolleys, railway cranes
- Curator: Gordon Murray
- Historian: Gordon Murray
- Owner: National Railways of Zimbabwe
- Parking: On site (no charge)

Bulawayo Railway Museum (established 1972) is a railway museum located at Bulawayo railway station in Zimbabwe that houses several exhibitions on the history of the railway system in Zimbabwe, formerly Rhodesia. Its oldest exhibits date back to 1897, and include Cecil Rhodes' personal railway coach. The museum is owned by National Railways of Zimbabwe (NRZ). Due to the severe shortage of rolling stock, some steam locomotives from the museum have, in the past, been refurbished and returned to service.

== Exhibits ==
Main exhibits are grouped into seven different classes namely:

1. Steam Locomotives
2. Diesel Electric Locomotives
3. Coaches and Saloons
4. Wagons
5. Trolleys
6. Railway Cranes
7. Other Miscellaneous Items

=== Steam Locomotives ===
- Lawley. 4-4-0. Falcon
- Small Class #1. 0-6-0T. 'Rhodesia'
- Small Class #7. 0-6-0ST. 'Jack Tar'
- 6th Class #19. 4-8-2T
- 7th Class. #43. 4-8-0
- 9A Class. #122. 4-8-0
- 9B Class. #115. 4-8-0
- 10th Class. #98. 4-8-0
- 11th Class. #127. 4-8-2
- 12th Class. #190. 4-8-2
- 14th Class. #507. 2-6-2+2-6-2 Garratt
- 16th Class. #600. 2-8-2+2-8-2 Garratt
- 19th Class. #330. 4-8-2. Henschel
- 20th Class. #730. 4-8-2+2-8-4 Garratt
- 20th Class. #736. 4-8-2+2-8-4 Garratt
- 20A Class. #740. 4-8-2+2-8-4 Garratt

=== Diesel Electric Locomotives ===
- Class DE1. #0106. Davenport.
- Class DE2. #1200. English Electric.
- Class DE3. #1314. English Electric.
- Class DE4. #1407. Brush.
- Class DE5. #1531. David Poole (Jung).
- Class DE7. #1708. SGP.
- Class DE8B. #1837. Sorefame.
- Class DE8B. #1845. Sorefame.

=== Coaches ===
- Dining Car #660. Chimanimani.
- C6 - Enginemens Caboose #21
- Enginemens Caboose #25
- Guards Van #89035
- C5 - Eye Surgery Coach #1823
- C3 - Rhodes Private Saloon
- C2 - Chaplain's service coach #872
- First Class coach #1045.
- First Class balcony coach #1058.
- Second Class balcony coach #2024.

=== Goods Wagons ===
- Short open wagon (wood)
- Short Livestock Wagon. (wood).
- 4 Wheel wooden underframe (Oldbury Rly Carriage Co Ltd.)
- Short explosives wagon EOZ 134167
- Short wooden 'K' wagon. RRKUK 843429
- Long Aluminium 'K' wagon. URR KHB
- Short metal 'K' wagon. URR KOZ

=== Trolleys ===
- T3 - used by Engineers to inspect the railway line
- Victoria Falls Trolley

=== Railway Cranes ===
- Booth Bros Crane
- Ransomes & Rapier Crane

=== Artifacts, Art and Photography ===
There are also a number of items and pieces of art related to the railway industry at the museum. These include pictures of the day the Queen of the United Kingdom visited Rhodesia, pictures of the "white train", a chronicle of Rhodes' death with his furniture in his coach, typewriters, train ticketing machines, train tickets, train passes, train destination boards, models of locomotives and coaches.

== Buildings ==
There are two key buildings at the Bulawayo Railway Museum. The first one, right by the entrance, is the Shamva Station and the other is the Main Hall which houses many of the special exhibits.

=== Shamva Station ===
This is a typical Rhodesian Railways station building, dismantled and moved from Shamva to the museum to serve as the main reception. It consists of a ticketing office with most of the notice boards and equipment (rain gauge, fire extinguishers, etc) a railway station was expected to have during Rhodesian Railway times.

=== Main Hall ===
This hall was once the mechanical workshop of the Bulawayo station. In it can be found much of the mechanical equipment used there and at the station. There is also a wall of fame of Chief Mechanical Engineers since the start of Rhodesia Railways until 2013. This hall houses the most important exhibits at the Museum.

== Management and Ownership ==
The Museum was created by Rhodesia Railways and is now owned by National Railways of Zimbabwe. It is managed by Gordon Murray, a retired member of the company.
