= Thomson Junction =

Marshalling yard in Zimbabwe

Coordinates: 18°20′20″S 26°26′57″E

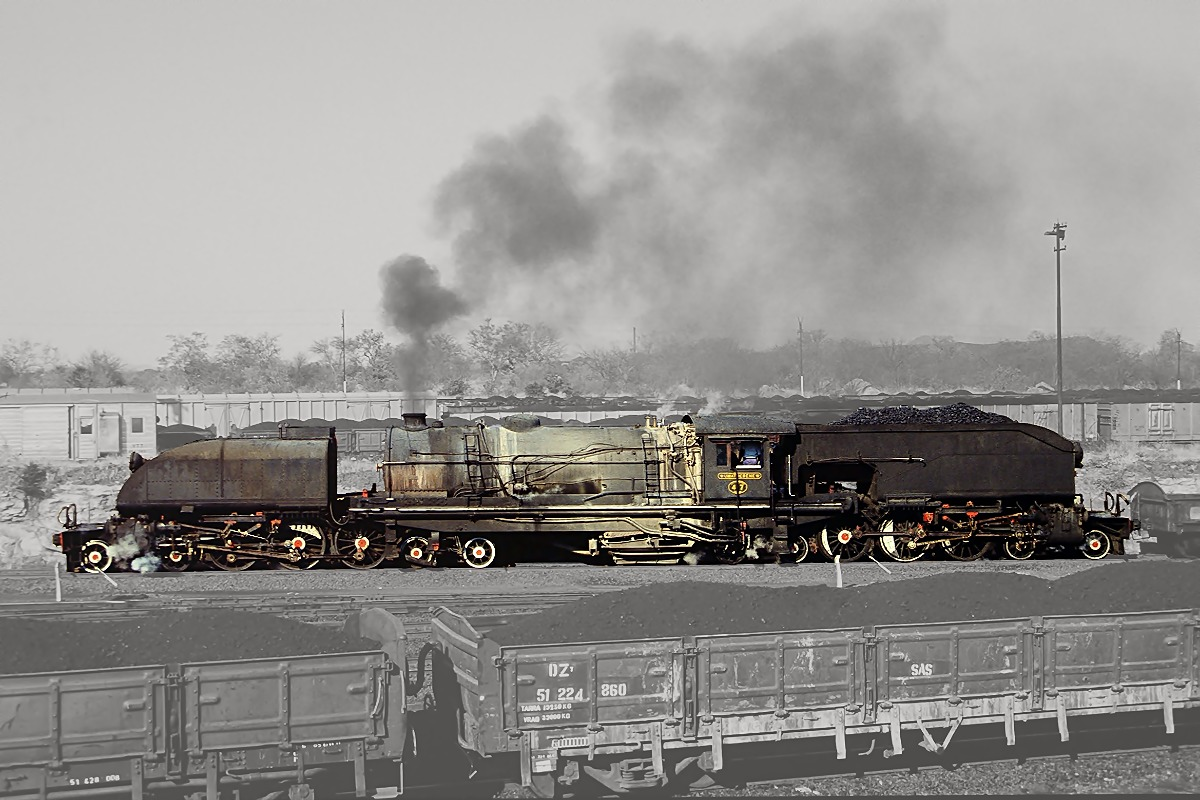
NRZ Garratt class 15 No 417 at Thomson Junction, July 1990

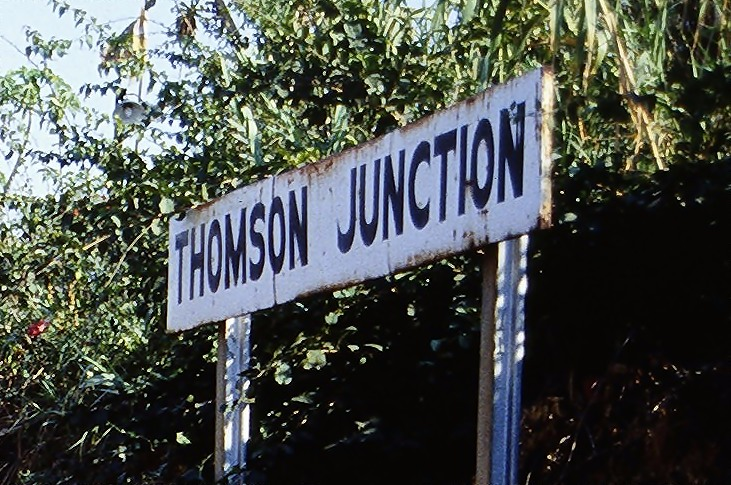
Signboard of Thomson Junction, Zimbabwe

Thomson Junction is a railway marshalling yard about four miles northwest of Hwange (formerly called Wankie), in the Zimbabwe coal fields area. Thomson Junction is named after A. R. Thomson Esq., General Manager of Wankie Colliery for many years.

Trains coming from the south and destined for Victoria Falls and further north into Zambia, and trains coming from the north going south to Bulawayo and onwards, are marshalled for their onward journeys at Thomson Junction marshalling yard.

In 2018, the yard saw a series of derailments. In November, a heavy goods train derailed at the yard, two weeks after a passenger train derailed blocking the line for two days.
