= Garratt locomotive =

Articulated steam locomotive

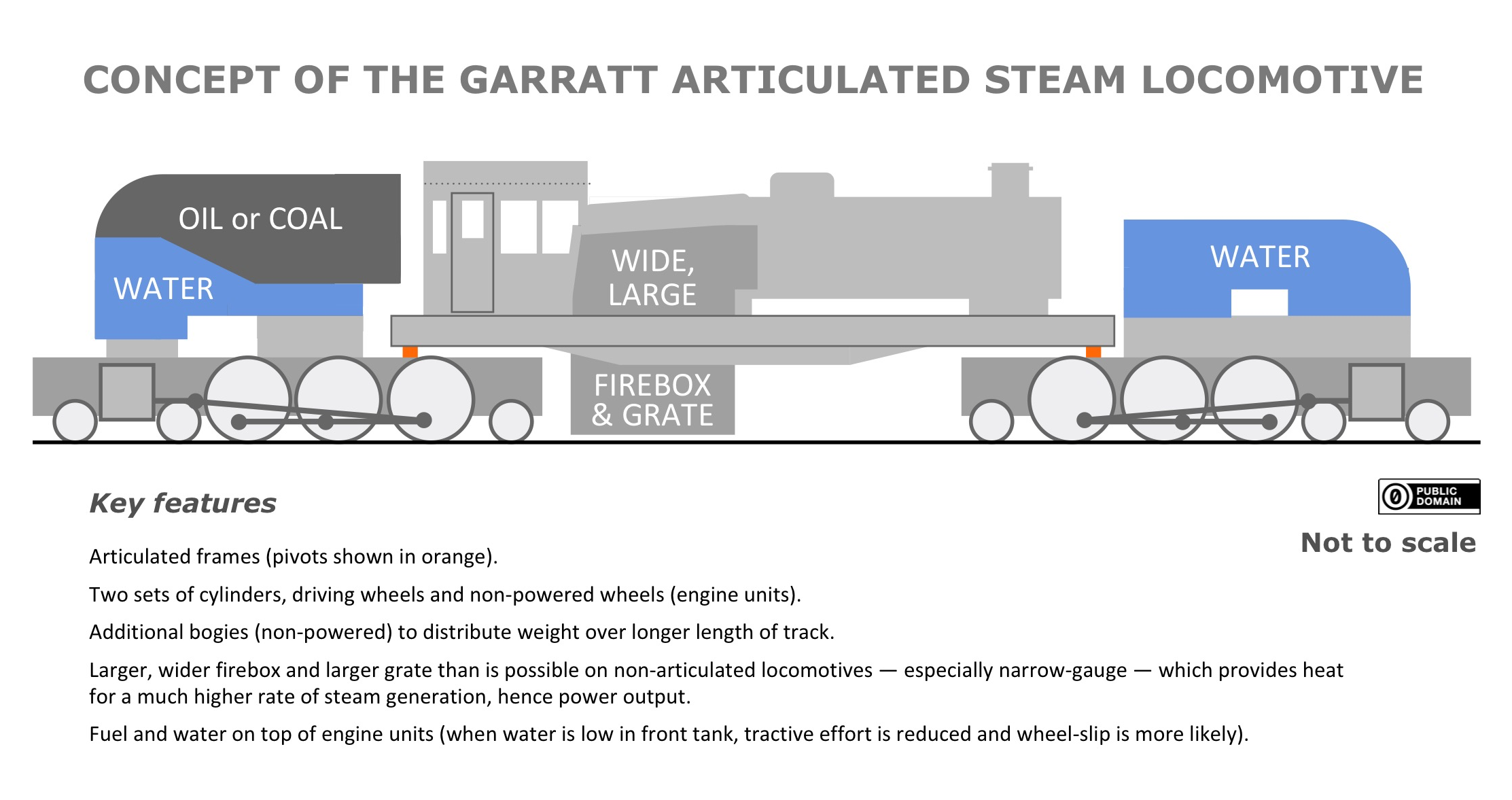
Characteristics of the Garratt articulated locomotive

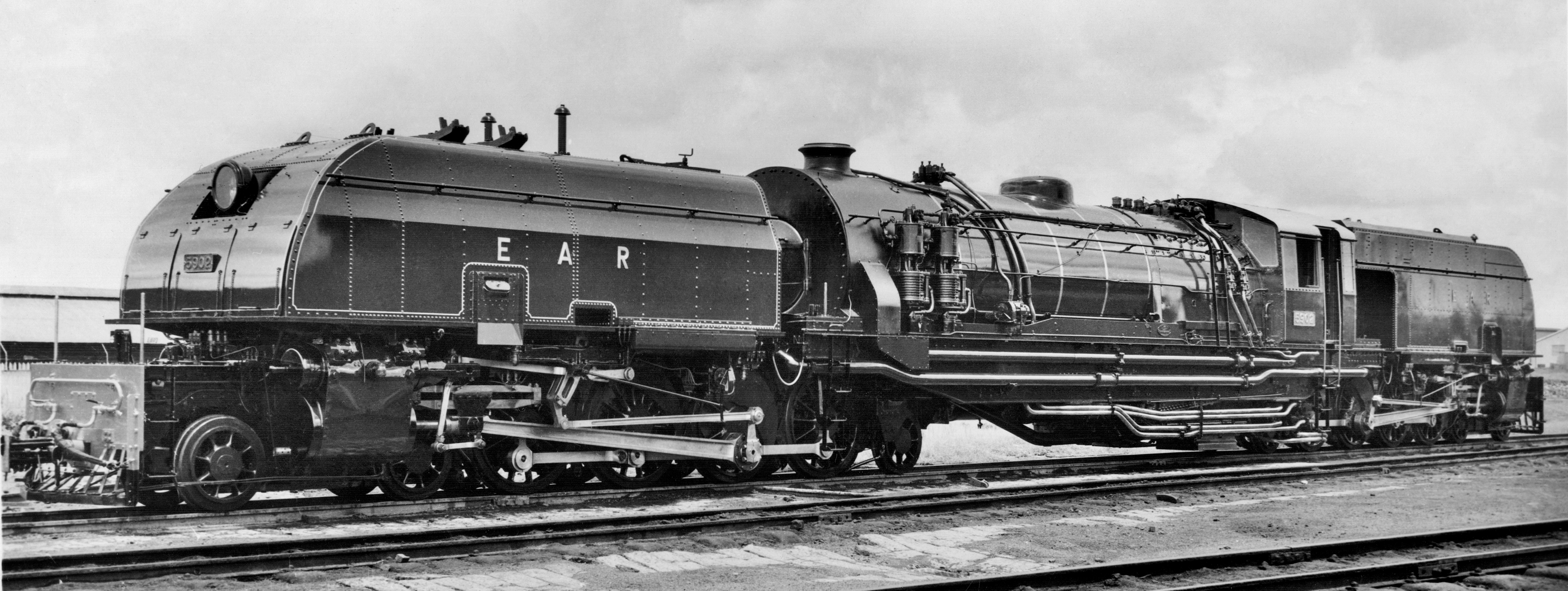
The Garratt with the highest tractive effort in the world was the East African Railways 59 class. Its tractive effort of 83,350 pounds was twice that of a British Railways class 9F 2-10-0

A Garratt locomotive is a type of three-part articulated steam locomotive invented by the engineer Herbert William Garratt. Its boiler, firebox, and cab are mounted on a centre frame or "bridge". The two other parts, one at each end, have a pivot to support the central frame; they consist of a steam engine unit – with driving wheels, trailing wheels, valve gear, and cylinders, and above it, fuel and/or water storage.

Articulation permits locomotives to negotiate curves that might restrict large rigid-framed locomotives. The design also provides more driving wheels per unit of locomotive weight, permitting operation on lightly engineered track. Garratt locomotives produced as much as twice the tractive effort (Note: Tractive effort is not the same as power: it is the measurement of a force, whereas power is the rate of doing work. The locomotive with the highest tractive effort is not necessarily the most powerful.) of the largest conventional locomotives of railways that introduced them, reducing the need for multiple locomotives and crews.

== Advantages of the Garratt design ==
The principal benefit of the Garratt design is that the boiler and firebox unit are slung between the two engine units. A further advantage is that the firebox and ashpan are not restricted in dimensions by running gear; the ashpan can have much larger capacity than on a normal locomotive, allowing longer continuous runs without needing to stop and empty the ashpan to clear combustion products from the grate. A large firebox and its unrestricted air supply also allowed the Garratt to operate with poor-quality fuel without reducing steaming capacity.

Garratts ran equally well in either direction, negating the need for turntables. Often they ran with the cab leading the boiler (sometimes called [fuel] bunker leading), especially on routes with tunnels.

Most Garratts were designed for freight or mixed traffic, but several Garratt classes were designed for passenger service. A French-built Algerian Railways Garratt holds the world speed record for an articulated locomotive at 132 kilometres per hour (82 mph). Garratts operating at higher speeds had one advantage over the Mallet design on account of the geometry of the design. When swinging around curves, the boiler and cab unit moved inward, reducing the centrifugal force, whereas the Mallet's forward articulated unit moved out as the locomotive rounded curves.

As O.S. Nock wrote, the Garratt type holds several advantages over the Mallet type:

This [the Mallet] was so designed to provide a very large engine unit, to be managed by a single crew, but to spread the dead weight over many axles and thus avoid excessive loads on the track and under-line bridges, and at the same time retain flexibility of wheelbase to facilitate operation on severely curved sections of line. The Mallet, having driving-wheel units beneath the boiler, retains the limitation in dimensions inherent in the orthodox type of steam locomotive, while the immense length of some of these machines is itself a handicap. Except with oil firing, ... one cannot put the cab in front. H.W. Garratt ... patented ... the idea of having a single large boiler slung on a cradle carried on two entirely separate engine units. ... The boiler could be developed to ideal proportions, unfettered by any wheels beneath it. It could be kept short, and of large diameter, which is the best possible form for securing a high rate of evaporation.

Although at the end of the steam locomotive era, most conventional steam locomotives had reached their maximum in "critical dimensions", the Garratt still had potential for further development, with larger driving wheels, larger boilers, and greater output still achievable.

== Disadvantages of the Garratt concept ==
The major theoretical disadvantage of a Garratt (shared with all tank engines) was that adhesive weight decreases as water is used up from the front tank and coal and water from the rear tank and bunker. The phenomenon does exist, but was minimised by the adhesion of the multiplicity of driving wheels, sufficient usually to avoid wheel slippage.

== Competitors, look-alikes, and variations on the theme ==
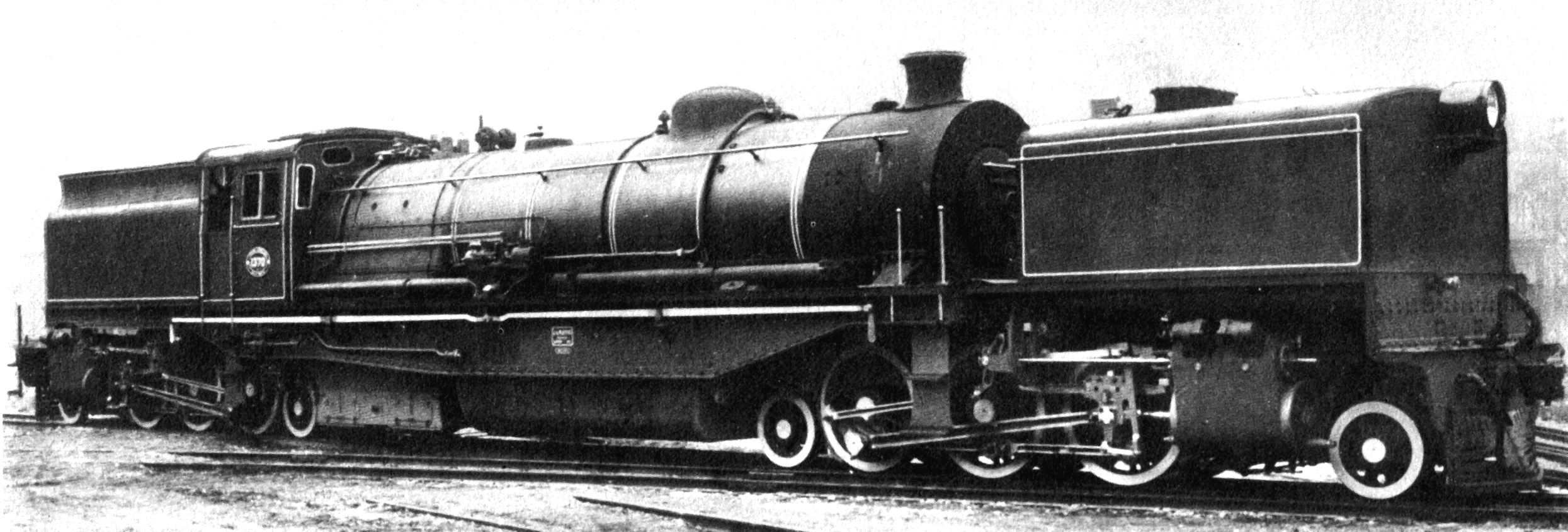
South African Union Garratt

The Garratt was not alone in the field of articulated locomotives; most notably, articulated locomotives in the United States based on the Mallet design achieved power outputs far exceeding those of Garratts. Away from North America were the Fairlie and Meyer articulated types. Further, similar designs to the Garratt were the Union Garratt, Modified Fairlie, and Golwé. Of these, the closest was the Union Garratt, a type originally prompted by the perceived necessity for a rigid connection between a bunker or tender and a firebox fed by a mechanical stoker. They were, in effect, a hybrid Fairlie and Garratt with the rear bunker attached to the frame instead of being carried on the rear bogie. The class GH and class U Union Garratts of the South African Railways were examples. (Note: The Union Garratt did not enjoy the success of the standard Garratt. It was soon evident that mechanical stokers could function across the connection between a Garratt's boiler and engine unit, making the rationale for the Union Garratt redundant. A weakness was the Union Garratts' extended boiler frames and the position of the bunker and hind water tank on those frames; the South African Railways U and GH classes had much heavier axle-loadings than Garratts of comparable size, weight, and power, and wear on the hind pivot was severe. The Union Garratt, like the Golwé and Modified Fairlie, was not perpetuated on anything like the scale of the Garratt, and no known examples survive.)

== Garratt development ==
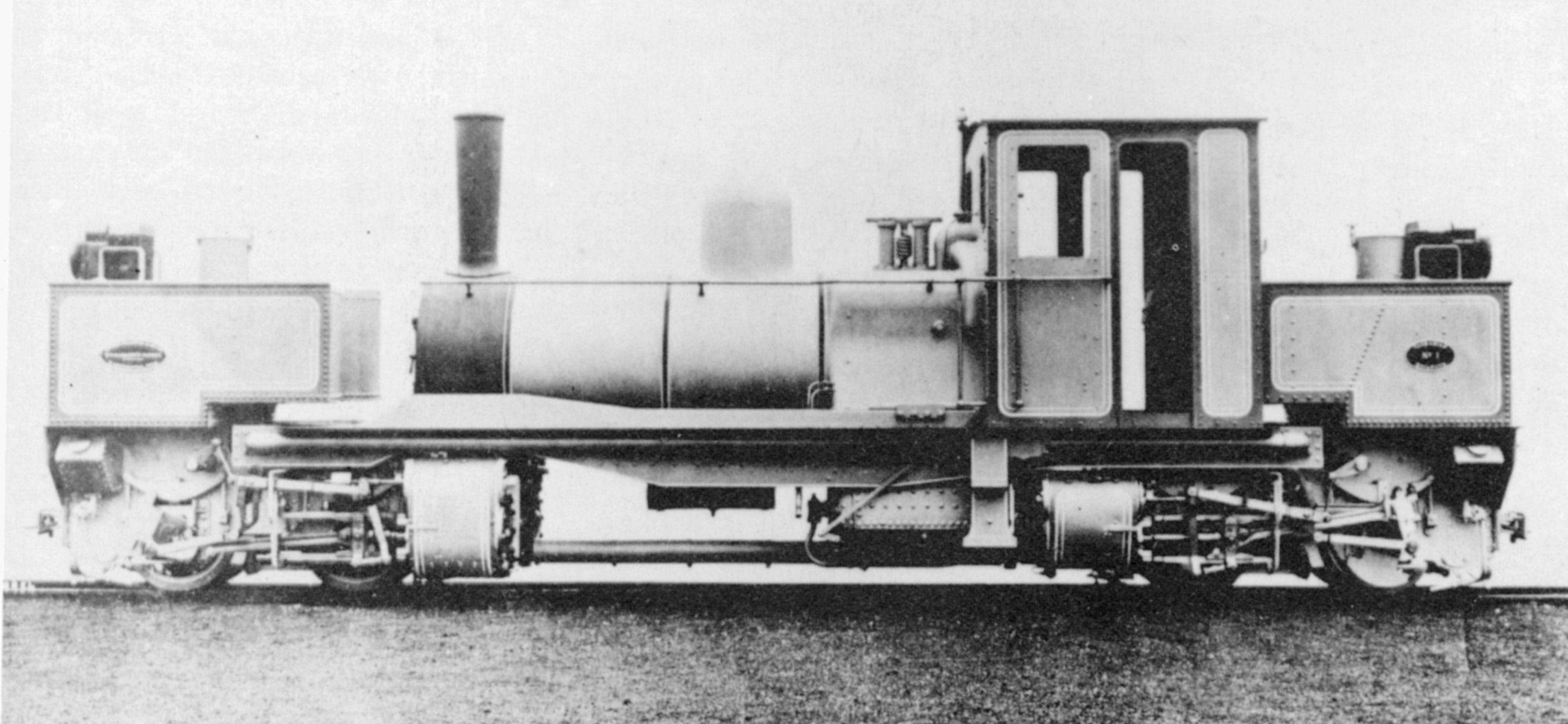
A builder's photo of the K1 locomotive (Tasmanian Government Railways K class), the first Garratt locomotive

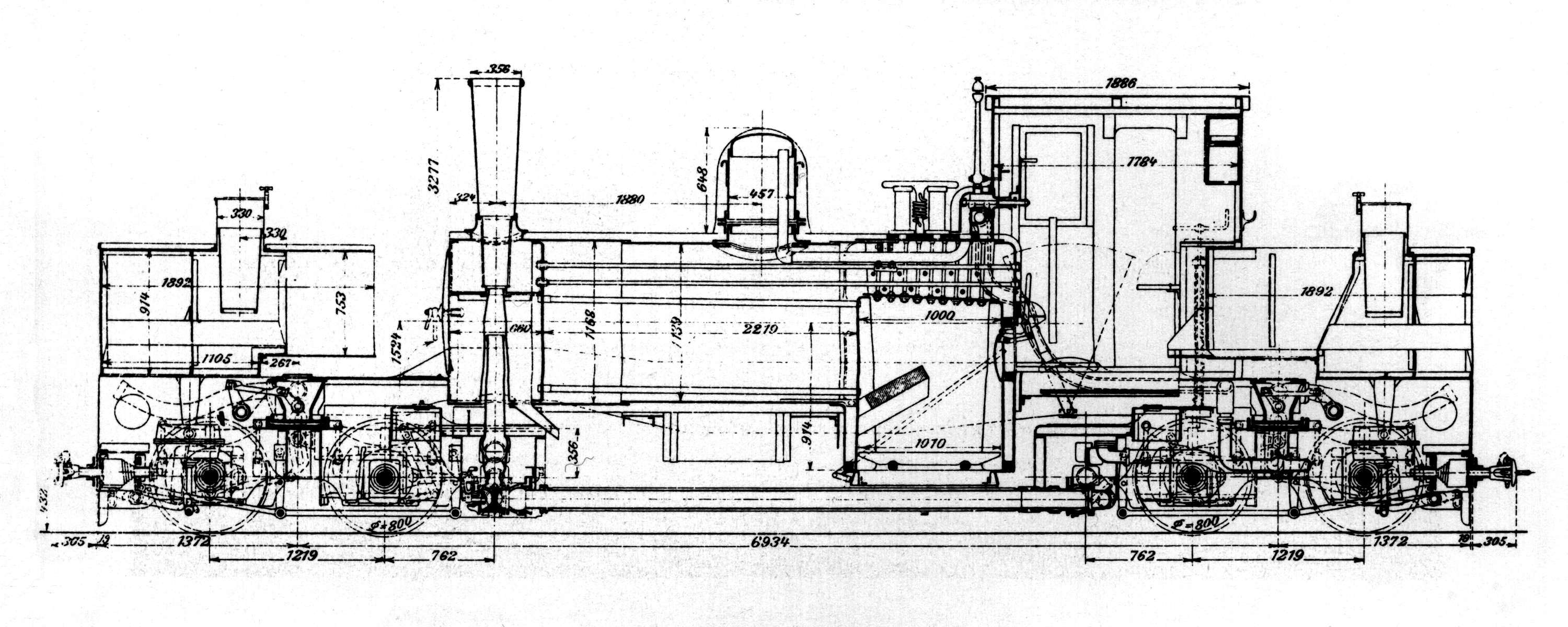
Works drawing of K1

Herbert William Garratt, a British locomotive engineer, invented the articulated locomotive concept that bore his name, for which he was granted a patent (no. 12079). At the time, he was the New South Wales Railways' inspecting engineer in London following a career with British colonial railways. Garratt first approached Kitson and Company with his design, but his idea was rejected, perhaps because that company were already committed to the Kitson-Meyer articulated design. He then approached Beyer, Peacock and Company, which were only marginally more interested.

=== The first Garratts ===
In 1907, Beyer, Peacock and Company submitted a proposal for a 2 ft (610 mm) gauge 0-4-0+0-4-0 Garratt to the New South Wales Government Railways, which was not proceeded with. The following year a design for a 2 ft gauge Mallet locomotive was submitted in reply to an enquiry from the Government of Tasmania. The company then proposed a Garratt design based on, but a little heavier than, the design for New South Wales, with capacity to negotiate curves of 99 ft (30.18 m) radius and 1 in 25 gradients. The proposal was accepted, and two locomotives were built in 1909, which became the K class.

The Tasmanian Railways stipulated two features that were not in Herbert Garratt's original concept. The first was a compound configuration in which two high-pressure cylinders were on the rear engine unit and a pipe led to two larger, low-pressure cylinders on the front engine unit. The second was to have the cylinders facing inwards, which would reduce the distances between both the main steam pipe and the high-pressure cylinders and between the high-pressure and low-pressure cylinders. The latter feature made the locomotive unnecessarily complicated and placed the high-pressure cylinders directly underneath the cab, making it uncomfortably hot for the crew on the rare days when Tasmania's West Coast Range was warm. Only one more Garratt locomotive was produced with compound propulsion (by Beyer, Peacock & Co. in 1927 for Burma Railways). The company built no more Garratts with inward-facing cylinders, but two Garratts operated by the Southern Fuegian tourist railway at Ushuaia in Argentina, largely based on the K class, have that feature. (Note: The locomotives, designated as the KM class, comprise no. 2, built in 1994 and rebuilt in 2001 at Ushuaia, and no. 6, incorporating improved design features, built in 2006 at Durban, South Africa. As of 2020, a third Garratt was under construction.)

Early design and construction difficulties involved the steam-tight flexible connections between the boiler unit and the power units. However, Beyer, Peacock's engineers solved them after studying a description of the spherical steam joints used on a Fairlie locomotive.

=== Darjeeling Himalayan Railway ===
The third Garratt (another 0-4-0+0-4-0, like the first two) was built in 1910 for the Darjeeling Himalayan Railway and given the class letter "D". The power output was intended to be double that of the line's existing 0-4-0ST locomotives, but only a 65% increase in loading was achieved.

=== First main-line class ===
In 1911, Beyer, Peacock & Company built six 2-6-0+0-6-2 Garratts for the Western Australian Government Railways. The M class were followed by the Ms class and the Msa class. These locomotives formed the pattern for the Victorian Railways narrow gauge G class and the Australian Portland Cement Garratts.

=== Final Garratts constructed ===
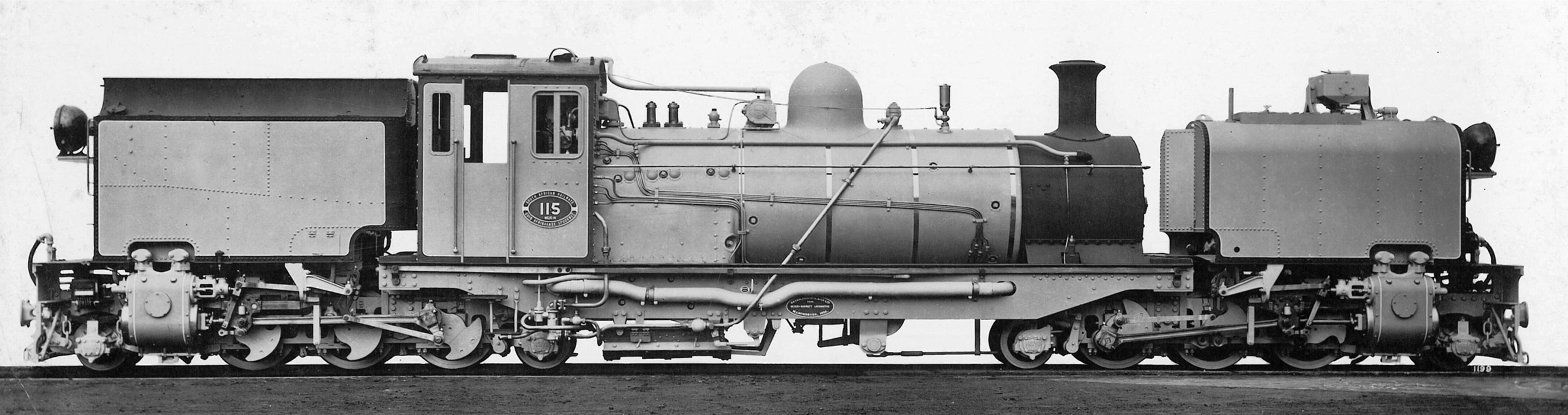
Class NG G16 no. NG115

Beyer, Peacock built more than a thousand Garratt or Beyer-Garratt locomotives. (Note: The term Garratt alone was used after 1907, when Herbert Garratt was granted his patent and subsequently Beyer, Peacock & Co. had sole rights of manufacture in Britain. After the patents ran out in 1928, the company began to use the name Beyer-Garratt to distinguish their locomotives.) The final built to a Beyer-Peacock design, in 1967–1968, were eight 2 ft (610 mm) gauge South African Railways Class NG G16 locomotives. (Note: The order was placed with Beyer, Peacock and Co., but since the firm was in the process of closing down, it subcontracted the order to the Hunslet Engine Company. Hunslet's South African subsidiary, Hunslet-Taylor, in Germiston, built the locomotives using boilers manufactured by their parent company.)

=== Production list ===
The following list shows known Garratt construction by all manufacturers.

Type	Gauge	Railway	Class	Units	Year	Builder
0-4-0+0-4-0	500 mm	Southern Fuegian Railway, Argentina	Ing.L.D.Porta	1	1994	Argentina
0-4-0+0-4-0	500 mm	Southern Fuegian Railway, Argentina	Ing.H.R.Zubieta	1	2006	Girdlestone Rail, South Africa
0-4-0+0-4-0	600 mm	C.F.Vicinaux du Mayumbe, Zaïre	E	1	1927	St. Leonard, Belgium
0-4-0+0-4-0	600 mm	C.F.Vicinaux du Mayumbe, Zaïre	A	2	1911	St. Leonard, Belgium
0-4-0+0-4-0	600 mm	C.F.Vicinaux du Mayumbe, Zaïre	A	2	1911	St. Leonard, Belgium
0-4-0+0-4-0	600 mm	C.F.Vicinaux du Mayumbe, Zaïre	B	2	1919	St. Leonard, Belgium
0-4-0+0-4-0	600 mm	C.F.Vicinaux du Mayumbe, Zaïre	B	4	1921	St. Leonard, Belgium
0-4-0+0-4-0	600 mm	C.F.Vicinaux du Mayumbe, Zaïre		5	1924	St. Leonard, Belgium
0-4-0+0-4-0	600 mm	C.F.Vicinaux du Mayumbe, Zaïre	C	4	1926	St. Leonard, Belgium
0-4-0+0-4-0	2 ft	Darjeeling Himalayan, India	D	1	1910	Beyer, Peacock
0-4-0+0-4-0	2 ft	Tasmanian Government Railways	K	2	1909	Beyer, Peacock
0-4-0+0-4-0	750 mm	Mines du Zaccar, Algeria		1	1936	Haine Saint-Pierre
0-4-0+0-4-0	750 mm	Mines du Zaccar, Algeria		1	1937	Haine Saint-Pierre
0-4-0+0-4-0	750 mm	Mines du Zaccar, Algeria		1	1912	St. Leonard, Belgium
0-4-0+0-4-0	1,000 mm	Porto Feliz Sugar Co., Brazil		1	1927	St. Leonard, Belgium
0-4-0+0-4-0	1,000 mm	Piracicaba Sugar Co., Brazil		1	1927	St. Leonard, Belgium
0-4-0+0-4-0	4 ft 8 1/2 in	Vivian & Sons (British Copper/ICI)		1	1924	Beyer, Peacock
0-4-0+0-4-0	4 ft 8 1/2 in	Sneyd Colliery, Burslem		1	1931	Beyer, Peacock
0-4-0+0-4-0	4 ft 8 1/2 in	Guest, Keen & Baldwins		1	1934	Beyer, Peacock
0-4-0+0-4-0	4 ft 8 1/2 in	Baddesley Colliery, Baddesley Ensor		1	1937	Beyer, Peacock
0-6-0+0-6-0	750 mm	C.F. du Congo		1	1913	St. Leonard, Belgium
0-6-0+0-6-0	750 mm	C.F. du Congo		12	1920-21	St. Leonard, Belgium
0-6-0+0-6-0	750 mm	C.F. du Congo		9	1924-25	St. Leonard, Belgium
0-6-0+0-6-0	750 mm	C.F. du Congo		10	1925-26	St. Leonard, Belgium
0-6-0+0-6-0	2 ft 6 in	Buthidaung-Maungdaw Tramway, Burma		2	1913	Beyer, Peacock
0-6-0+0-6-0	1,000 mm	SNCV, Belgium	Type 23	1	1929	St. Leonard, Belgium
0-6-0+0-6-0	1,000 mm	SNCV, Belgium	Type 23	1	1930	St. Leonard, Belgium
0-6-0+0-6-0	4 ft 8 1/2 in	Limburg Tramway, the Netherlands		1	1931	Hanomag & Henschel
2-4-0+0-4-2	2 ft 6 in	Ceylon Government Railway	H1	1	1929	Beyer, Peacock
2-4-0+0-4-2	1,000 mm	São Paulo Railway Company, Brazil		1	1919	São Paulo Railway
2-4-0+0-4-2	5 ft 3 in	São Paulo Railway Company, Brazil	Q	3	1915	Beyer, Peacock
2-4-2+2-4-2	1,000 mm	Leopoldina Railway, Brazil		4	1943	Beyer, Peacock
2-6-0+0-6-2	10 1/4 in	Wells & Walsingham Light Railway		1	1986	Neil Simkins
2-6-0+0-6-2	10 1/4 in	Wells & Walsingham Light Railway		1	2010	Wells & Walsingham Light Railway
2-6-0+0-6-2	2 ft	South African Railways	NG G11	3	1919	Beyer, Peacock
2-6-0+0-6-2	2 ft	South African Railways	NG G11	2	1925	Beyer, Peacock
2-6-0+0-6-2	2 ft 6 in	Victorian Railways, Australia	G	2	1926	Beyer, Peacock
2-6-0+0-6-2	1,000 mm	São Paulo Railway, Brazil	U	1	1912	Beyer, Peacock
2-6-0+0-6-2	1,000 mm	São Paulo Railway, Brazil	V	1	1936	Beyer, Peacock
2-6-0+0-6-2	1,000 mm	C.F.Madagascar	B	2	1926	St. Leonard, Belgium
2-6-0+0-6-2	3 ft 6 in	South African Railways	GA	1	1920	Beyer, Peacock
2-6-0+0-6-2	3 ft 6 in	Australian Portland Cement		1	1936	Beyer, Peacock
2-6-0+0-6-2	3 ft 6 in	Australian Portland Cement		1	1939	Beyer, Peacock
2-6-0+0-6-2	3 ft 6 in	Western Australian Government Railways	M	6	1911	Beyer, Peacock
2-6-0+0-6-2	3 ft 6 in	Western Australian Government Railways	Ms	7	1912	Beyer, Peacock
2-6-0+0-6-2	3 ft 6 in	Western Australian Government Railways	Msa	10	1930	Midland Railway Workshops
2-6-0+0-6-2	4 ft 8 1/2 in	Argentine North Eastern Railway (FCNEA)		3	1925	Beyer, Peacock
2-6-0+0-6-2	4 ft 8 1/2 in	London Midland & Scottish Railway		3	1927	Beyer, Peacock
2-6-0+0-6-2	4 ft 8 1/2 in	Argentine North Eastern Railway (FCNEA)		4	1927	Beyer, Peacock
2-6-0+0-6-2	4 ft 8 1/2 in	Entre Rios Railway (FCER), Argentina		5	1927	Beyer, Peacock
2-6-0+0-6-2	4 ft 8 1/2 in	London Midland & Scottish Railway		30	1930	Beyer, Peacock
2-6-2+2-6-2	2 ft	South African Railways	NG G16	8	1939	Beyer, Peacock
2-6-2+2-6-2	2 ft	South African Railways	NG G16	7	1951	Beyer, Peacock
2-6-2+2-6-2	2 ft	South African Railways	NG G16	7	1958	Beyer, Peacock
2-6-2+2-6-2	2 ft	South African Railways	NG G12	2	1927	Franco-Belge, Belgium
2-6-2+2-6-2	2 ft	South African Railways	NG G14	1	1930	Hanomag
2-6-2+2-6-2	2 ft	South African Railways	NG G13	3	1927	Hanomag
2-6-2+2-6-2	2 ft	South African Railways	NG G13	2	1928	Hanomag
2-6-2+2-6-2	2 ft	South African Railways	NG G13	7	1928	Hanomag
2-6-2+2-6-2	2 ft	South African Railways	NG G16	8	1967-68	Hunslet-Taylor
2-6-2+2-6-2	2 ft	South African Railways	NG G16	4	1936	John Cockerill
2-6-2+2-6-2	2 ft 6 in	Nepal Government Railway		1	1932	Beyer, Peacock
2-6-2+2-6-2	2 ft 6 in	Nepal Government Railway		1	1947	Beyer, Peacock
2-6-2+2-6-2	2 ft 6 in	Sierra Leone Government Railway		3	1926	Beyer, Peacock
2-6-2+2-6-2	2 ft 6 in	Sierra Leone Government Railway		2	1928	Beyer, Peacock
2-6-2+2-6-2	2 ft 6 in	Sierra Leone Government Railway		2	1929	Beyer, Peacock
2-6-2+2-6-2	2 ft 6 in	Sierra Leone Government Railway		4	1942	Beyer, Peacock
2-6-2+2-6-2	2 ft 6 in	Sierra Leone Government Railway		2	1943	Beyer, Peacock
2-6-2+2-6-2	1,000 mm	Great Western of Brazil		2	1929	Armstrong Whitworth
2-6-2+2-6-2	1,000 mm	La Robla railway, Spain		2	1931	Babcock & Wilcox, Spain
2-6-2+2-6-2	1,000 mm	Assam Bengal Railway, India	T	5	1927	Beyer, Peacock
2-6-2+2-6-2	1,000 mm	Transandine Railway, Argentina	E12	4	1930	Beyer, Peacock
2-6-2+2-6-2	1,000 mm	Minera de Sierra Minera, Spain		2	1930	Euskalduna, Spain
2-6-2+2-6-2	1,000 mm	La Robla railway, Spain		2	1929	Hanomag
2-6-0+0-6-2	1,000 mm	C.G. de F. Catalanes, Spain		4	1922	St. Leonard, Belgium
2-6-0+0-6-2	1,000 mm	C.G. de F. Catalanes, Spain		4	1925	St. Leonard, Belgium
2-6-2+2-6-2	3 ft 6 in	South African Railways	GB	1	1921	Beyer, Peacock
2-6-2+2-6-2	3 ft 6 in	Natal Navigation Collieries, South Africa		1	1925	Beyer, Peacock
2-6-2+2-6-2	3 ft 6 in	South African Railways	GG	1	1925	Beyer, Peacock
2-6-2+2-6-2	3 ft 6 in	Dundee Coal & Coke, South Africa		1	1927	Beyer, Peacock
2-6-2+2-6-2	3 ft 6 in	Trans Zambezia, Moçambique/Nyasaland	E	1	1930	Beyer, Peacock
2-6-2+2-6-2	3 ft 6 in	Consolidated Main Reef Mine, South Africa		1	1935	Beyer, Peacock
2-6-2+2-6-2	3 ft 6 in	Tasmanian Government Railways	L	2	1912	Beyer, Peacock
2-6-2+2-6-2	3 ft 6 in	New Cape Central Railway, South Africa	G	2	1923	Beyer, Peacock
2-6-2+2-6-2	3 ft 6 in	Trans Zambezia, Moçambique/Nyasaland	E	2	1924	Beyer, Peacock
2-6-2+2-6-2	3 ft 6 in	South African Railways	GB	6	1924	Beyer, Peacock
2-6-2+2-6-2	3 ft 6 in	South African Railways	GC	6	1924	Beyer, Peacock
2-6-2+2-6-2	3 ft 6 in	South African Railways	GD	4	1925	Beyer, Peacock
2-6-2+2-6-2	3 ft 6 in	Rhodesia Railways	13	12	1926	Beyer, Peacock
2-6-2+2-6-2	3 ft 6 in	South African Railways	GD	7	1925	Beyer, Peacock
2-6-2+2-6-2	3 ft 6 in	South African Railways	GD	3	1926	Beyer, Peacock
2-6-2+2-6-2	3 ft 6 in	Rhodesia Railways	14	6	1929	Beyer, Peacock
2-6-2+2-6-2	3 ft 6 in	Guayaquil & Quito Railway, Ecuador		3	1929	Beyer, Peacock
2-6-2+2-6-2	3 ft 6 in	Rio Tinto Railway, Spain		2	1928	Beyer, Peacock
2-6-2+2-6-2	3 ft 6 in	Rhodesia Railways	14	10	1930	Beyer, Peacock
2-6-2+2-6-2	3 ft 6 in	Rhodesia Railways	14A	12	1952	Beyer, Peacock
2-6-2+2-6-2	3 ft 6 in	Rhodesia Railways	14A	6	1953	Beyer, Peacock
2-6-2+2-6-2	3 ft 6 in	South African Railways	GCA	26	1928	Krupp
2-6-2+2-6-2	3 ft 6 in	South African Railways	GCA	13	1927	Krupp
2-6-2+2-6-2	3 ft 6 in	South African Railways	GDA	5	1929	Linke-Hofmann-Busch
2-6-2+2-6-2	5 ft 6 in	North Western Railway, India	GAS	1	1925	Beyer, Peacock
2-6-2+2-6-2	5 ft 6 in	Ceylon Government Railway	C1	1	1927	Beyer, Peacock
2-6-2+2-6-2	5 ft 6 in	São Paulo Railway, Brazil	R1	6	1927	Beyer, Peacock
2-6-2+2-6-2	5 ft 6 in	Ceylon Government Railway	C1A	8	1945	Beyer, Peacock
2-8-0+0-8-2	1,000 mm	Burma Railways	GA.I	1	1924	Beyer, Peacock
2-8-0+0-8-2	1,000 mm	Burma Railways	GA.II	1	1927	Beyer, Peacock
2-8-0+0-8-2	1,000 mm	Burma Railways	GA.III	3	1927	Beyer, Peacock
2-8-0+0-8-2	1,000 mm	War Department, Assam Bengal Railway	Light	10	1943	Beyer, Peacock
2-8-0+0-8-2	1,000 mm	Burma Railways	GA.IV	8	1929	Krupp
2-8-0+0-8-2	4 ft 8 1/2 in	London & North Eastern Railway	U1	1	1925	Beyer, Peacock
2-8-0+0-8-2	4 ft 8 1/2 in	Ottoman Railways, Turkey		1	1927	Beyer, Peacock
2-8-0+0-8-2	4 ft 8 1/2 in	Mauritius Railway		3	1927	Beyer, Peacock
2-8-0+0-8-2	5 ft 6 in	Bengal Nagpur Railway, India	HSG	2	1925	Beyer, Peacock
2-8-2+2-8-2	1,000 mm	C.F. Franco Ethiopien & Libya		6	1939	Ansaldo, Italy
2-8-2+2-8-2	1,000 mm	War Department, India/Burma		14	1944	Beyer, Peacock
2-8-2+2-8-2	1,000 mm	Royal State Railways of Thailand		6	1929	Henschel
2-8-2+2-8-2	1,000 mm	Royal State Railways of Thailand		2	1936	Henschel
2-8-2+2-8-2	3 ft 6 in	Sierra Leone Development Corporation		1	1937	Beyer, Peacock
2-8-2+2-8-2	3 ft 6 in	Sierra Leone Development Corporation		1	1937	Beyer, Peacock
2-8-2+2-8-2	3 ft 6 in	South African Railways	GE	6	1924	Beyer, Peacock
2-8-2+2-8-2	3 ft 6 in	South African Railways	GE	10	1927	Beyer, Peacock
2-8-2+2-8-2	3 ft 6 in	Rhodesia Railways		8	1929-30	Beyer, Peacock
2-8-2+2-8-2	3 ft 6 in	South African Railways	GE	2	1930	Beyer, Peacock
2-8-2+2-8-2	3 ft 6 in	Sierra Leone Development Corporation		2	1931	Beyer, Peacock
2-8-2+2-8-2	3 ft 6 in	Rhodesia Railways		6	1938	Beyer, Peacock
2-8-2+2-8-2	3 ft 6 in	Rhodesia Railways		6	1937	Beyer, Peacock
2-8-2+2-8-2	3 ft 6 in	War Department, Congo/Gold Coast/Rhodesia		18	1943	Beyer, Peacock
2-8-2+2-8-2	3 ft 6 in	Rhodesia Railways		30	1953	Beyer, Peacock
2-8-2+2-8-2	4 ft 8 1/2 in	Central of Peru		1	1931	Beyer, Peacock
2-8-2+2-8-2	4 ft 8 1/2 in	Nitrate Railways, Chile		3	1926	Beyer, Peacock
2-8-2+2-8-2	4 ft 8 1/2 in	Nitrate Railways, Chile		3	1928	Beyer, Peacock
2-8-2+2-8-2	4 ft 8 1/2 in	Central of Peru		3	1930	Beyer, Peacock
2-8-2+2-8-2	5 ft 6 in	Central of Aragon, Spain		6	1931	Babcock & Wilcox, Spain
2-8-2+2-8-2	5 ft 6 in	Renfe, Spain		10	1960	Babcock & Wilcox, Spain
4-4-2+2-4-4	3 ft 6 in	Tasmanian Government Railways	M	2	1912	Beyer, Peacock
4-4-2+2-4-4	4 ft 8 1/2 in	Entre Rios Railway (FCER), Argentina		5	1927	Beyer, Peacock
4-4-2+2-4-4	4 ft 8 1/2 in	Argentine North Eastern (FCNAR)		3	1930	Beyer, Peacock
4-6-0+0-6-4	3 ft	Ferrocarril Pacifico de Colombia		2	1924	Armstrong Whitworth
4-6-0+0-6-4	1,000 mm	Mogyana Railway, Brazil		2	1912	Beyer, Peacock
4-6-0+0-6-4	1,000 mm	Mogyana Railway, Brazil		3	1914	Beyer, Peacock
4-6-2+2-6-4	3 ft	Ferrocarril Dorada, Colombia		2	1938	Beyer, Peacock
4-6-2+2-6-4	1,000 mm	Midland of Buenos Aires, Argentina		2	1929	Beyer, Peacock
4-6-2+2-6-4	1,000 mm	Leopoldina Railway, Brazil		2	1929	Beyer, Peacock
4-6-2+2-6-4	1,000 mm	Leopoldina Railway, Brazil		6	1937	Beyer, Peacock
4-6-2+2-6-4	1,000 mm	Leopoldina Railway, Brazil		8	1943	Beyer, Peacock
4-6-2+2-6-4	1,000 mm	Vicoa Ferrea do Rio Grande do Sul, Brazil		10	1931	Henschel
4-6-2+2-6-4	3 ft 6 in	New Zealand Government Railways	G	3	1928	Beyer, Peacock
4-6-2+2-6-4	3 ft 6 in	Nigerian Railways		4	1935	Beyer, Peacock
4-6-2+2-6-4	3 ft 6 in	Nigerian Railways		2	1936	Beyer, Peacock
4-6-2+2-6-4	3 ft 6 in	Nigerian Railways		6	1937	Beyer, Peacock
4-6-2+2-6-4	3 ft 6 in	Nigerian Railways		4	1939	Beyer, Peacock
4-6-2+2-6-4	3 ft 6 in	Nigerian Railways		6	1943	Beyer, Peacock
4-6-2+2-6-4	3 ft 6 in	South African Railways	GF	37	1927	Hanomag
4-6-2+2-6-4	3 ft 6 in	South African Railways	GF	18	1928	Henschel
4-6-2+2-6-4	3 ft 6 in	South African Railways	GF	10	1928	Maffei
4-6-2+2-6-4	4 ft 8 1/2 in	PLM, Algeria	231-132.AT	1	1932	Franco-Belge, France
4-6-2+2-6-4	4 ft 8 1/2 in	C.F.Algeria	231-132.BT	12	1936	Franco-Belge, France
4-6-2+2-6-4	4 ft 8 1/2 in	C.F.Algeria	231-132.BT	4	1937	Franco-Belge, France
4-6-2+2-6-4	4 ft 8 1/2 in	C.F.Algeria	231-132.BT	6	1939	Franco-Belge, France
4-6-2+2-6-4	4 ft 8 1/2 in	C.F.Algeria	231-132.BT	7	1940	Franco-Belge, France
4-6-2+2-6-4	5 ft 6 in	Central of Aragon, Spain		6	1931	Euskalduna, Bilbao
4-6-4+4-6-4	3 ft 6 in	Sudan Railways	250	4	1936	Beyer, Peacock
4-6-4+4-6-4	3 ft 6 in	Sudan Railways	250	6	1937	Beyer, Peacock
4-6-4+4-6-4	3 ft 6 in	Rhodesia Railways	15th	4	1940	Beyer, Peacock
4-6-4+4-6-4	3 ft 6 in	Rhodesia Railways	15th	10	1947	Beyer, Peacock
4-6-4+4-6-4	3 ft 6 in	Rhodesia Railways	15th	20	1948–49	Beyer, Peacock
4-6-4+4-6-4	3 ft 6 in	Rhodesia Railways	15A	15	1949–50	Beyer, Peacock
4-6-4+4-6-4	3 ft 6 in	Rhodesia Railways	15A	15	1950	Beyer, Peacock
4-6-4+4-6-4	3 ft 6 in	Rhodesia Railways	15A	10	1952	Franco-Belge, France
4-8-0+0-8-4	5 ft 6 in	Bengal Nagpur Railway, India	N	16	1929	Beyer, Peacock
4-8-0+0-8-4	5 ft 6 in	Bengal Nagpur Railway, India	NM	10	1931	Beyer, Peacock
4-8-2+2-8-4	2 ft 6 in	Sierra Leone Government		14	1955-56	Beyer, Peacock
4-8-2+2-8-4	1,000 mm	Kenya Uganda Railway	EC	4	1926	Beyer, Peacock
4-8-2+2-8-4	1,000 mm	Kenya Uganda Railway	EC1	12	1928	Beyer, Peacock
4-8-2+2-8-4	1,000 mm	Kenya Uganda Railway	EC1	8	1928	Beyer, Peacock
4-8-2+2-8-4	1,000 mm	Antofagasta (Chili) & Bolivia Railway		3	1929	Beyer, Peacock
4-8-2+2-8-4	1,000 mm	Cordoba Central Railway, Argentina	E11	10	1929	Beyer, Peacock
4-8-2+2-8-4	1,000 mm	Kenya Uganda Railway	EC1	2	1930	Beyer, Peacock
4-8-2+2-8-4	1,000 mm	Tanganyika Railway	GA	3	1931	Beyer, Peacock
4-8-2+2-8-4	1,000 mm	War Department, Kenya Uganda Railway	Heavy	7	1943	Beyer, Peacock
4-8-2+2-8-4	1,000 mm	War Department, Burma	Light	20	1945	Beyer, Peacock
4-8-2+2-8-4	1,000 mm	Kenya Uganda Railway	EC6	6	1949	Beyer, Peacock
4-8-2+2-8-4	1,000 mm	Burma Railways	GE	4	1949	Beyer, Peacock
4-8-2+2-8-4	1,000 mm	Angola: Luanda Railway (CFL)	500	6	1949	Beyer, Peacock
4-8-2+2-8-4	1,000 mm	Antofagasta (Chili) & Bolivia Railway		6	1950	Beyer, Peacock
4-8-2+2-8-4	1,000 mm	East African Railways	60	4	1954	Beyer, Peacock
4-8-2+2-8-4	1,000 mm	East African Railways	59	27	1955	Beyer, Peacock
4-8-2+2-8-4	1,000 mm	East African Railways	60	8	1954	Beyer, Peacock
4-8-2+2-8-4	1,000 mm	East African Railways	59	7	1955	Beyer, Peacock
4-8-2+2-8-4	1,000 mm	East African Railways	60	5	1954	Beyer, Peacock
4-8-2+2-8-4	1,000 mm	CF d'Afrique Occidentale Française	93	10	1938	Franco-Belge, France
4-8-2+2-8-4	1,000 mm	CF d'Afrique Occidentale Française	93	10	1939	Franco-Belge, France
4-8-2+2-8-4	1,000 mm	CF d'Afrique Occidentale Française	93	7	1941	Franco-Belge, France
4-8-2+2-8-4	1,000 mm	East African Railways	60	12	1954	Franco-Belge, France
4-8-2+2-8-4	1,000 mm	Rede Ferrovaria do Noroeste, Brazil		6	1952	Henschel
4-8-2+2-8-4	1,000 mm	Kenya Uganda Railway	EC	10	1931	NBL
4-8-2+2-8-4	1,050 mm	PLM, Algeria	241-142.YAT	4	1931	Franco-Belge, France
4-8-2+2-8-4	3 ft 6 in	Queensland Railways	ASG	5	1944	Clyde Engineering
4-8-2+2-8-4	3 ft 6 in	Tasmanian Government Railways	ASG	2	1945	Clyde Engineering
4-8-2+2-8-4	3 ft 6 in	Queensland Railways	ASG	3	1944	Clyde Engineering
4-8-2+2-8-4	3 ft 6 in	Western Australian Government Railways	ASG	6	1945	Clyde Engineering
4-8-2+2-8-4	3 ft 6 in	Tasmanian Government Railways	ASG	3	1945	Clyde Engineering
4-8-2+2-8-4	3 ft 6 in	Western Australian Government Railways	ASG	3	1945	Clyde Engineering
4-8-2+2-8-4	3 ft 6 in	Queensland Government Railways	ASG	9	1943-44	Islington Railway Workshops
4-8-2+2-8-4	3 ft 6 in	Western Australian Government Railways	ASG	1	1943-44	Islington Railway Workshops
4-8-2+2-8-4	3 ft 6 in	Western Australian Government Railways	ASG	2	1944 ca	Islington Railway Workshops
4-8-2+2-8-4	3 ft 6 in	Western Australian Government Railways	ASG	5	1943-44	Midland Railway Workshops
4-8-2+2-8-4	3 ft 6 in	Western Australian Government Railways	ASG	5	1944 ca	Midland Railway Workshops
4-8-2+2-8-4	3 ft 6 in	Queensland Government Railways	ASG	5	1943-44	Newport Workshops
4-8-2+2-8-4	3 ft 6 in	Western Australian Government Railways	ASG	1	1944	Newport Workshops
4-8-2+2-8-4	3 ft 6 in	Western Australian Government Railways	ASG	2	1945	Newport Workshops
4-8-2+2-8-4	3 ft 6 in	Australian Portland Cement	ASG	1	1945	Newport Workshops
4-8-2+2-8-4	3 ft 6 in	Tasmanian Government Railways	ASG	3	1944	Newport Workshops
4-8-2+2-8-4	3 ft 6 in	Queensland Railways	ASG	1	1944	Newport Workshops
4-8-2+2-8-4	3 ft 6 in	Angola: Benguela Railway (CFB)	10A	6	1927	Beyer, Peacock
4-8-2+2-8-4	3 ft 6 in	South African Railways	GL	2	1930	Beyer, Peacock
4-8-2+2-8-4	3 ft 6 in	Emu Bay Railway, Tasmania		3	1929	Beyer, Peacock
4-8-2+2-8-4	3 ft 6 in	Angola: Benguela Railway (CFB)	10B	14	1930	Beyer, Peacock
4-8-2+2-8-4	3 ft 6 in	Nigerian Railways		2	1930	Beyer, Peacock
4-8-2+2-8-4	3 ft 6 in	South African Railways	GL	6	1930	Beyer, Peacock
4-8-2+2-8-4	3 ft 6 in	South African Railways	GM	16	1938	Beyer, Peacock
4-8-2+2-8-4	3 ft 6 in	South African Railways	GEA	50	1945-47	Beyer, Peacock
4-8-2+2-8-4	3 ft 6 in	Queensland Government Railways	BG	10	1951	Beyer, Peacock
4-8-2+2-8-4	3 ft 6 in	Angola: Benguela Railway (CFB)	10C	10	1951	Beyer, Peacock
4-8-2+2-8-4	3 ft 6 in	Angola: Benguela Railway (CFB)	10C	2	1952	Beyer, Peacock
4-8-2+2-8-4	3 ft 6 in	South African Railways	GMA	3	1956	Beyer, Peacock
4-8-2+2-8-4	3 ft 6 in	Angola: Benguela Railway (CFB)	10C	6	1952	Beyer, Peacock
4-8-2+2-8-4	3 ft 6 in	Angola: Benguela Railway (CFB)	10D	10	1955-56	Beyer, Peacock
4-8-2+2-8-4	3 ft 6 in	South African Railways	GMA	5	1956	Beyer, Peacock
4-8-2+2-8-4	3 ft 6 in	Rhodesia Railways	20	15	1954-55	Beyer, Peacock
4-8-2+2-8-4	3 ft 6 in	South African Railways	GMA	15	1956	Beyer, Peacock
4-8-2+2-8-4	3 ft 6 in	Rhodesia Railways	20	6	1957	Beyer, Peacock
4-8-2+2-8-4	3 ft 6 in	Rhodesia Railways	20A	40	1957-58	Beyer, Peacock
4-8-2+2-8-4	3 ft 6 in	South African Railways	GMA	10	1958	Beyer, Peacock
4-8-2+2-8-4	3 ft 6 in	C.F.Moçambique	951	12	1952	Haine Saint-Pierre
4-8-2+2-8-4	3 ft 6 in	C.F. du Bas Congo a Katanga	900	12	1953	Haine Saint-Pierre
4-8-2+2-8-4	3 ft 6 in	Queensland Government Railways	BG	20	1951	Franco-Belge, France
4-8-2+2-8-4	3 ft 6 in	South Australian Railways	400	10	1953	Franco-Belge, France
4-8-2+2-8-4	3 ft 6 in	Angola: Moçamedes Railway (CFM)	100	6	1953	Henschel
4-8-2+2-8-4	3 ft 6 in	C.F.Moçambique	971	5	1956	Henschel
4-8-2+2-8-4	3 ft 6 in	South African Railways	GMA	25	1952	Henschel
4-8-2+2-8-4	3 ft 6 in	South African Railways	GO	25	1954	Henschel
4-8-2+2-8-4	3 ft 6 in	South African Railways	GMA	30	1954	Henschel
4-8-2+2-8-4	3 ft 6 in	Angola: Luanda Railway (CFL)	550	6	1954	Krupp
4-8-2+2-8-4	3 ft 6 in	South African Railways	GMA	12	1956	NBL
4-8-2+2-8-4	3 ft 6 in	South African Railways	GMA	10	1958	NBL
4-8-2+2-8-4	3 ft 6 in	South African Railways	GMA	10	1958	NBL
4-8-2+2-8-4	4 ft 8 1/2 in	Iranian State Railway	86	4	1936	Beyer, Peacock
4-8-2+2-8-4	5 ft	Soviet Railways	? [Ya]	1	1932	Beyer, Peacock
4-8-2+2-8-4	5 ft 6 in	Buenos Aires and Pacific Railway, Argentina	951	1	1931	Beyer, Peacock
4-8-2+2-8-4	5 ft 6 in	Buenos Aires Great Southern Railway, Argentina	14	12	1928	Beyer, Peacock
4-8-2+2-8-4	5 ft 6 in	Buenos Aires and Pacific Railway, Argentina	951	3	1930	Beyer, Peacock
4-8-2+2-8-4	5 ft 6 in	Bengal Nagpur Railway, India	P	4	1939	Beyer, Peacock
4-8-4+4-8-4	1,000 mm	Kenya Uganda Railway	EC3	6	1939	Beyer, Peacock
4-8-4+4-8-4	1,000 mm	Kenya Uganda Railway	EC3	6	1940	Beyer, Peacock
4-8-4+4-8-4	1,000 mm	Kenya Uganda Railway	EC3	18	1949	Beyer, Peacock
4-8-4+4-8-4	4 ft 8 1/2 in	New South Wales Government Railways	AD60	25	1952	Beyer, Peacock
4-8-4+4-8-4	4 ft 8 1/2 in	New South Wales Government Railways	AD60	17	1952	Beyer, Peacock
4-8-4+4-8-4	4 ft 8 1/2 in	New South Wales Government Railways	AD60	5	1952	Beyer, Peacock

== Garratts around the world ==
Garratts were used in Africa, Asia, Australia, Europe, and South America. No Garratts were used on North American railroads, the most likely explanation being that American rail companies considered the Garratt's coal and water capacities insufficient for their requirements.

=== Africa ===
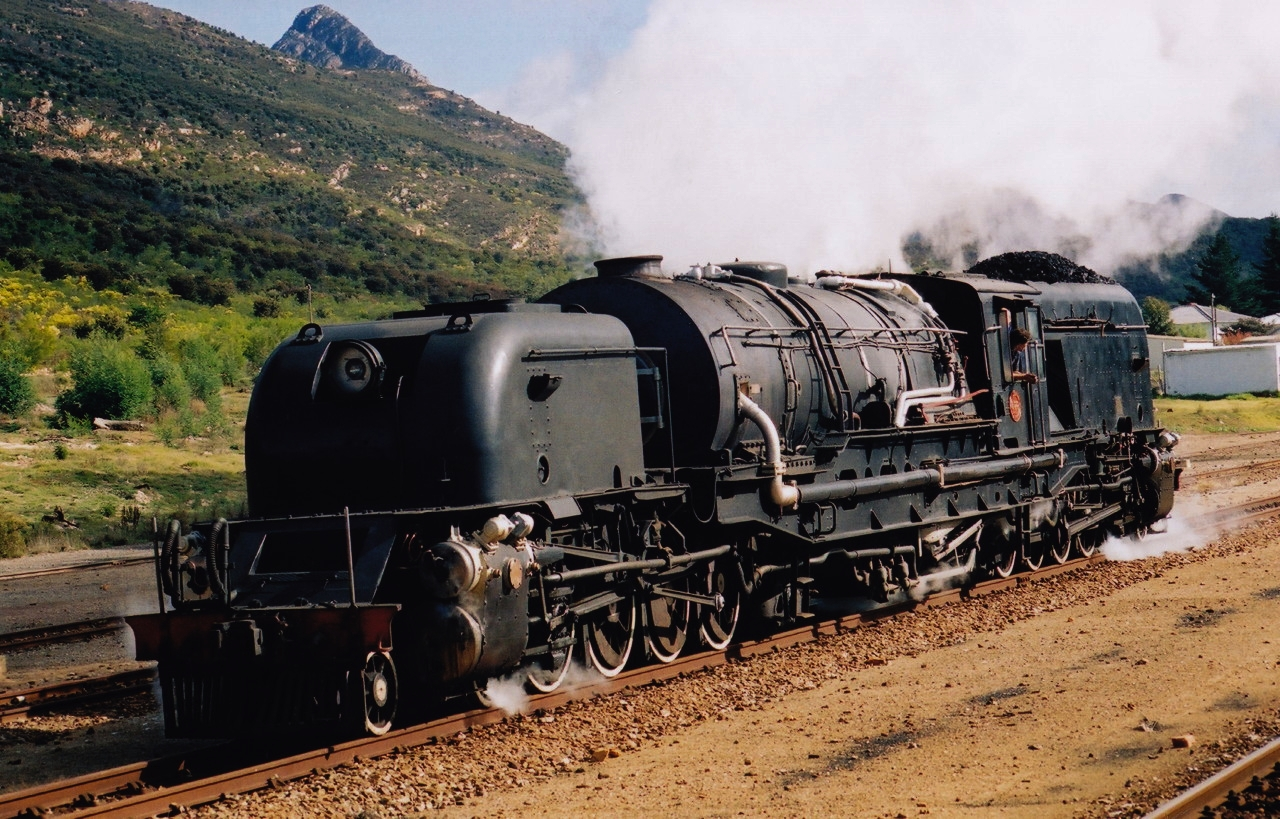
South African Class GMAM Garratt

The Garratt was most widely used in Africa: large numbers were in South Africa, Rhodesia (now Zimbabwe) and Algeria, and smaller numbers in Angola, Congo, Ghana, Ivory Coast, Kenya, Libya, Madagascar, Mozambique, Nigeria, Senegal, Sierra Leone, Sudan, Uganda and Zaïre.

==== Algeria ====
231+132BT Class

In 1932, a prototype Garratt locomotive with a 4-6-2+2-6-4 wheel arrangement, numbered AT.1, was built for the Paris–Lyon–Mediterranean Railway Company for its Algerian System by the Société Franco-Belge de Matériel de Chemins de Fer at Raismes, France. It was unusual for a Garratt in being designed for high-speed passenger services rather than slow freight: during testing, one reached a Garratt-record speed of 131 kilometres per hour (81 miles per hour).^{[fr]} It was reported that the standard-gauge locomotive "rode steadily and smoothly" at these high speeds. The driving wheels, 1.8 metres (5 feet 11 inches) in diameter, were the largest of any Garratt class. Cossart valve gear, similar to Walschaerts valve gear but electrically operated, powered cam-operated piston valves; these allowed earlier cutoffs, enhancing fuel economy. Mechanical stokers were incorporated. The two fuel and water tank units were streamlined.

Four years later, 12 more locomotives following the prototype's design, designated the 231-132BT class, were delivered to the railway, soon to be renamed Chemins de Fer algériens (Algerian Railways). A further 17 followed, the last 7 being delivered in 1940. The 30 locomotives operated mainly on the Algiers–Oran line, hauling loads as high as 460 long tons (467 tonnes) up 1-in-50 grades until the Algerian independence war caused their withdrawal in 1951. (Note: Another source cites problems with the electric valve gear.)

==== Angola ====
All three main railways in Angola used Garratts. The largest user was the 3 ft 6 in (1,067 mm) gauge Caminho de Ferro de Benguela. Forty-eight were purchased from Beyer, Peacock between 1926 and 1956. They came in four batches: class 10A (301–306); class 10B (311–324) in 1930; class 10C (331–348) in 1954; and class 10D (361–370).

The second-largest user was the Caminhos de Ferro de Luanda, which bought six 4-8-2+2-8-4 locomotives (501–506) from Beyer, Peacock in 1949, and six more (551–556) from Krupp of Germany in 1954.

The third user was the Caminhos de Ferro de Moçâmedes, who bought six 4-8-2+2-8-4 locomotives (101–106) from Henschel & Son of Germany.

==== Botswana ====
Garratts operated on 3 ft 6 in (1,067 mm) gauge through trains from South Africa to Rhodesia.

==== Kenya, Tanzania and Uganda ====
Kenya and Uganda Railways and Harbours, which operated railways in British East Africa and the Uganda Protectorate from 1929 to 1948, acquired 77 Garratts between the same years. The Tanganyika Railway also acquired 3 in 1928. In 1948, the railways merged to form the East African Railways and Harbours Corporation, commonly known in the railways context as East African Railways, shown by the letters "EAR" on rolling stock.

In addition to the 80 acquired Garratts, East African Railways operated 63 that it purchased new between 1954 and 1956, making a total of 143. More details are in the following table.

Class	Type	Qty	Loco nos	Built	Formerly	Notes
50	EC1	18	5001–5020	1928	KUR 45–64	1
51	EC1	2	5101–5102	1930	KUR 65–66	
52	EC2	10	5201–5210	?	KUR 67–76	2
53	GA	3	5301–5303	1928	TR 700–702	1
55	GB	11	5501–5511	1945	KUR 120–121 plus 9 from Burma	
56	EC6	6	5601–5606	1949	KUR 122–127	
57	EC3	12	5701–5712	1940	KUR 77–88	3
58	EC3	18	5801–5818	1949	KUR 89–106	3
59	Mountain	34	5901–5934	1955–1956	(new)	
60	Governor	29	6001–6029	1954	(new)	2
Notes: 1. KUR: Kenya Uganda Railways. TR: Tanganyika Railway.; 2. All were built by Beyer, Peacock except for the 52 class, which was built by North British Locomotive Company, Glasgow. Some of the 60 class were built by Société Franco-Belge in France, under contract from Beyer, Peacock.; 3. All were of the 4-8-2+2-8-4 wheel arrangement, except the 57 and 58 classes, which were 4-8-4+4-8-4.

The East African Railways 4-8-2+2-8-4 59 class Garratts were the largest and most powerful steam locomotives to run on metre gauge, having a large 70-square-foot (6.5-square-metre) grate and a tractive effort of 83,350 pounds-force (370.76 kilonewtons). The 34 oil-fired locomotives remained in regular service until 1980. As of 2020, the Nairobi Railway Museum held two of them.

==== Mozambique ====
4-6-4+4-6-4 and 4-8-2+2-8-4 Garratts operated in Mozambique, some built as late as 1956.

==== Rhodesia / Zimbabwe and Zambia ====
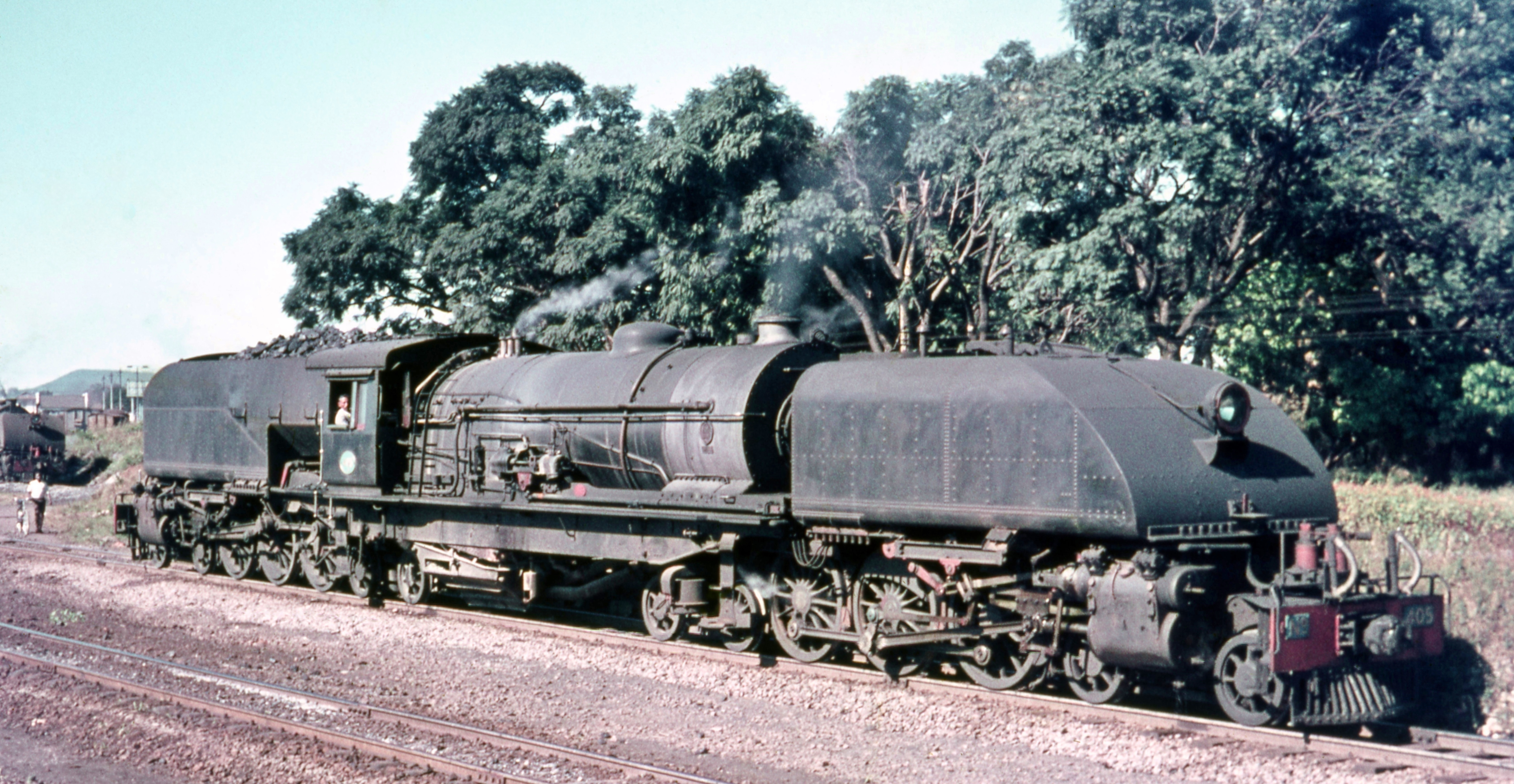
Locomotive no. 405 (15th class, Zambia Railways, formerly 15th class Rhodesia Railways) at Ndola, Zambia, in 1968

Rhodesia imported 246 3 ft 6 in (1,067 mm) gauge Garratts of four different wheel arrangements: 2-6-2+2-6-2s of the 13th, 14th and 14A classes; 4-6-4+4-6-4s of the 15th class, 2-8-2+2-8-2s of the 16th, 16A, and 18th classes; and 4-8-2+2-8-4s of the 20th and 20A classes. Many went to Zambia Railways in 1967 when Rhodesia Railways surrendered the lines in Zambia to its government. Zimbabwe's economic and political situation has extended the life of its Garratts. Five Garratts, including some from the Zimbabwe National Railway Museum, were returned to service in 2004–05 to haul commuter trains. As of 2011 they were performing shunting duties around the city of Bulawayo.

==== Sierra Leone ====
On the Sierra Leone Government Railway, this 2 ft 6 in (762 mm) gauge system had 2-6-2+2-6-2 Garratts starting in the 1920s and in the middle 1950s purchased 14 4-8-2+2-8-4 Garratts.

==== South Africa ====
In 1921, the South African Railways held a comparative trial between three 3 ft 6 in (1,067 mm) locomotives: a class 14B 4-8-2 tender engine; a class MH Mallet 2-6-6-2, and a newly arrived class GA Garratt 2-6-0+0-6-2 – the first Garratt of that gauge to enter service in South Africa. The trial was conducted on the line between Durban and Ladysmith, which had gradients as steep as 1 in 30 and curves as tight as 4.5 chains (91 metres) in radius. The Garratt proved the superior locomotive in all regards.

The most powerful of all Garratts irrespective of gauge were the South African Railways' eight 3 ft 6 in (1,067 mm) gauge GL class locomotives of 1929–30, which delivered 89,130 lbf (396.47 kN) of tractive effort. They were all out of service by the late 1960s. There was also a proposal for a quadruplex super Garratt locomotive with a 2-6-6-2+2-6-6-2 wheel arrangement for South African Railways, but this was never built.

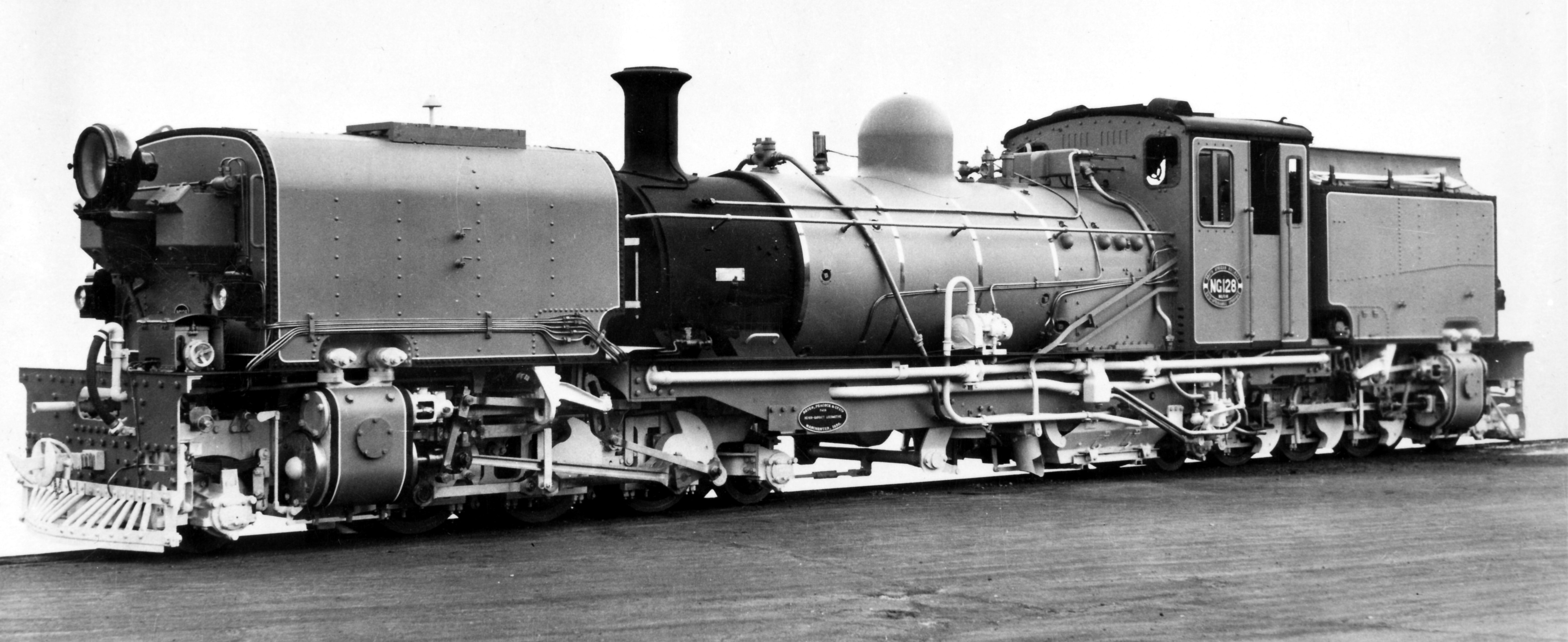
Beyer, Peacock-built no. NG128, c. 1951

On the two foot gauge lines in South Africa, several successive classes of Garratts were made, of which the NG G16 became the most powerful steam locomotive ever built for the gauge. Some of these were imported to Wales for the Welsh Highland Railway.

==== Sudan ====
Sudan operated at least one 4-6-4+4-6-4 Garratt.

=== Asia ===
==== Myanmar (Burma) ====
Burma had 43 metre gauge Garratts. Five B class 2-8-0+0-8-2 Garratts went to the Burma Railway Company between 1924 and 1927, with seven more built by Krupp of Germany in 1929. They were followed by 31 locomotives transferred from India for War Department service: ten 2-8-0+0-8-2 locomotives, class GB (ex-Indian class MWGL); twelve 2-8-2+2-8-2 locomotives of class GC (ex-Indian class MWGH); and nine 4-8-2+2-8-4 locomotives of class GD (ex-Indian class MWGX). A class of four 4-8-2+2-8-4 locomotives, the GE class, was built for Burma Railways in 1949, but was diverted to the Assam Railway in India.

Two 0-6-0+0-6-0 2 ft 6in gauge Beyer-Garratts were supplied to the Buthidaung-Maungdaw Tramway which became the Arakan Light Railway. BP works Nos. 5702 & 5703 of 1913 refer.

==== Ceylon (now Sri Lanka) ====
Ceylon had 10 Garratts: an H1 class 2 ft 6 in (762 mm) 2-4-0+0-4-2 in 1924, a C1 class 5 ft 6 in (1,676 mm) 2-6-2+2-6-2 in 1927 and eight more C1 class 5 ft 6 in gauge 2-6-2+2-6-2s in 1945.

==== India ====
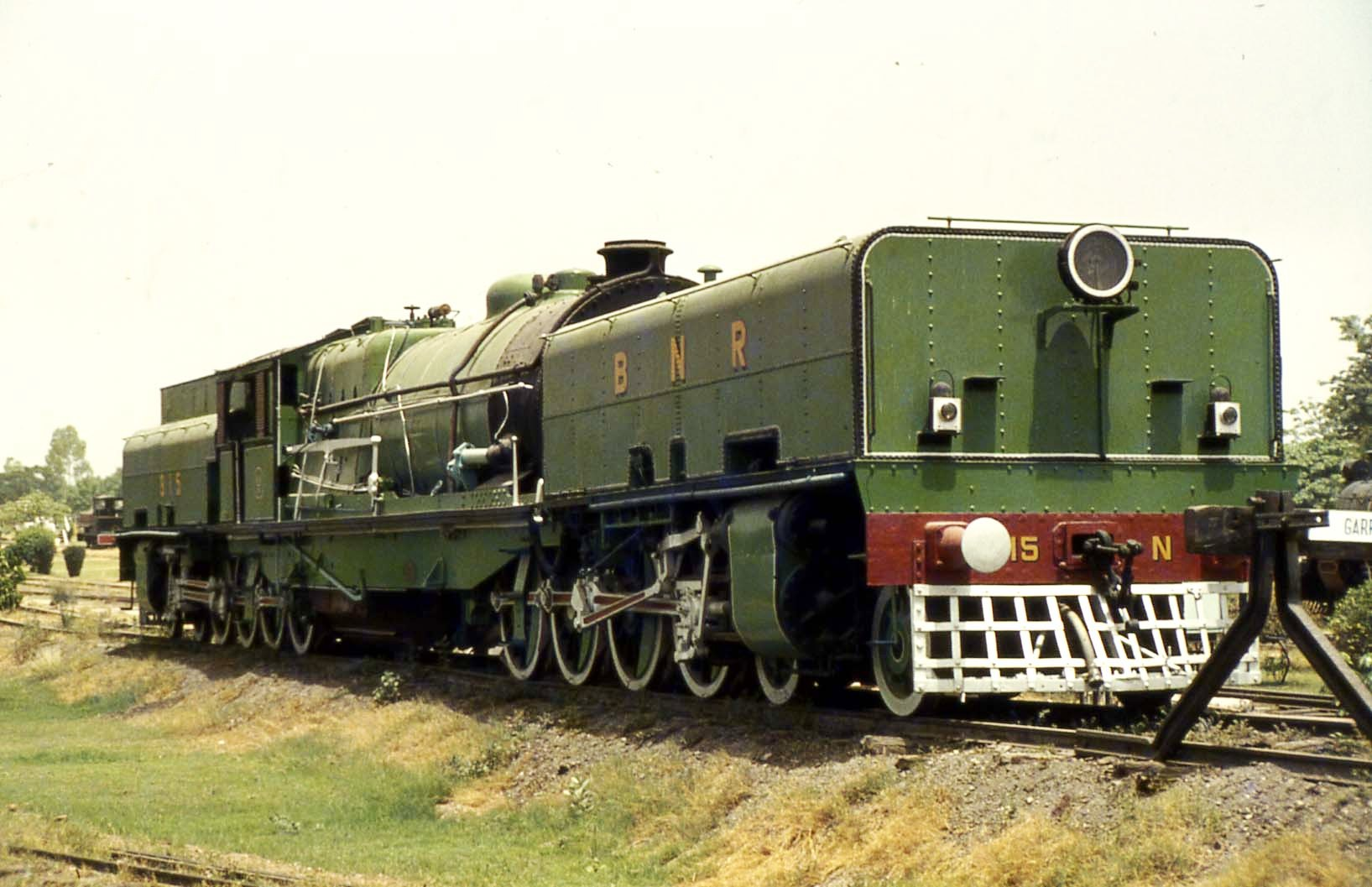
Bengal Nagpur Railway 815, Class N (BP 6594 of 1930), at the National Rail Museum, New Delhi

India had 83 Garratts. One 5 ft 6 in (1,676 mm) gauge 2-6-2+2-6-2 was built for the Indian State in 1925. The 5 ft 6 in gauge Bengal Nagpur Railway had 32 Garratts: a pair of HSG class 2-8-0+0-8-2 locomotives built in 1925; 16 N class and 10 NM class 4-8-0+0-8-4 locomotives built in 1930–31 and four P class 4-8-2+2-8-4 locomotives built in 1939.

The metre gauge Assam-Bengal Railway had six T class 2-6-2+2-6-2 locomotives built in 1927. They later became the GT class on the Bengal Assam Railway. Three types of Garratt were supplied for war service on the BAR: ten MWGL class 2-8-0+0-8-2 locomotives; twelve MWGH 2-8-2+2-8-2 locomotives; and 18 MWGX class 4-8-2+2-8-4 War Department standard light Garratts. Of these, only nine MWGX stayed in India, with the remainder transferred to Burma. After the war, the four Burma Railways GE class 4-8-2+2-8-4s were diverted to the Assam Railway.

==== Iran ====
The Trans-Iranian Railway had four 4-8-2+2-8-4 Garratts (class 86) built in 1936.

==== Mauritius ====
Mauritius had three standard gauge 2-8-0+0-8-2 Garratts that were built in 1927.

==== Nepal ====
The Nepal Government Railway (NGR) had 2-6-2+2-6-2 Garratt locomotives manufactured by Beyer, Peacock and Company in 1932 and 1947.

==== Siam (Thailand) ====
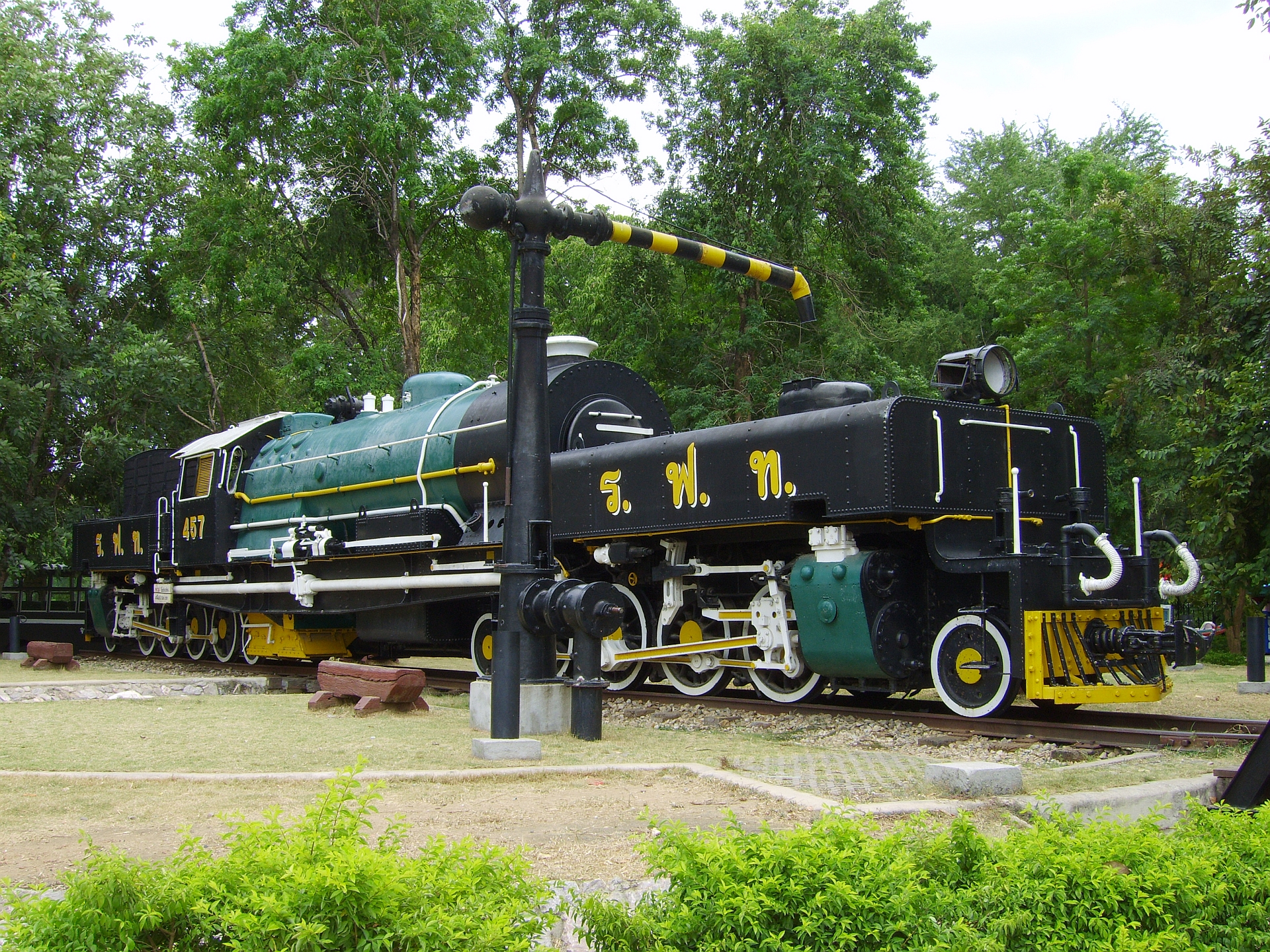
Preserved Garratt no.457 at Kanchanaburi railway station, Thailand

The Royal State Railway of Siam acquired 8 Garratts built by the German company Henschel during 1929–1937 for heavy freight duties in the Pak Chong highland areas. One has been preserved; it is displayed at Kanchanaburi railway station.

==== Turkey ====
Turkish State Railways had just one standard gauge 2-8-0+0-8-2 Garratt that was built in 1927.

=== Australasia ===
The Australian Standard Garratt (ASG) was designed in Australia as an emergency measure during World War II, when demand on 1067 mm (3 ft 6 in) narrow-gauge railways could not be met by the available stock of locomotives. The ASG was used on the railways of Queensland, Western Australia and Tasmania and, after the war, on the South Australian Railways, the Emu Bay Railway in Tasmania and the Fyansford Cement Works railway in Victoria.

The first was built in a record-breaking four months, entering service in September 1943. Considerable differences between the states, especially in loading gauges, sharpness of curves and limits to axle load, compromised the design, as did the inclusion of features that led to unreliability. A royal commission convened in 1946 to investigate the locomotives, whose deficiencies had caused enginemen to go on strike, concluded: "It is obvious when one analyses the evidence that the new Australian Standard Garratt has put up a poor performance. At times these locomotives have done good work but they cannot compare with the old Beyer Garratts, which have such an enduring record of service." (Note: Of the many defects as delivered, those considered to be poor design at the concept stage, and which could not be blamed on a shortage of resources or lack of time, included problems with bogie frames and control springs, flexing of the plate frames, the side-emptying ashpan, low firedoor, unbalanced regulator, inadequate side-wearing surfaces of the driving axleboxes, absence of slings to the firebox stays in the breaking zones and the absence of a self-cleaning smokebox.) Many were withdrawn in September 1945, weeks after the war ended. Those sold to the South Australian Railways in 1952 (as a stopgap) served for only 18 months, but others lasted longer: on the Queensland Government Railways for two years, at Fyansford and Emu Bay for 11 years, on the Tasmanian Government Railways (including some ex-QR engines) for 13 years, and on the Western Australian Government Railways for 14 years, during which periods many of the defects were rectified or components replaced.

==== New South Wales ====
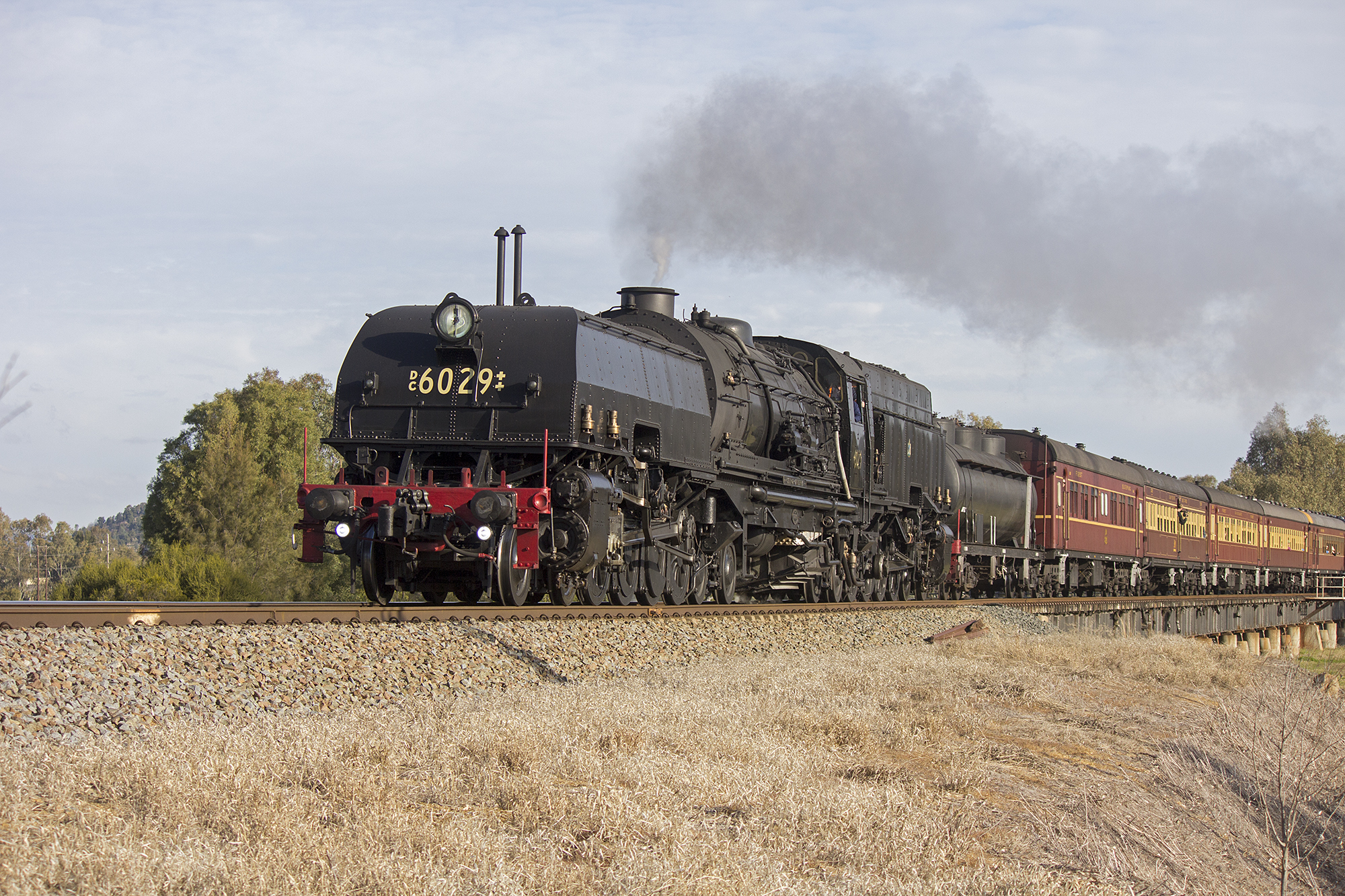
Preserved former New South Wales Government Railways AD60 class no. 6029, City of Canberra

New South Wales Government Railways introduced the 4-8-4+4-8-4 AD60 Garratt in 1952, built by Beyer, Peacock. The AD60 weighed 265 tonnes, with a 16-tonne axle loading. As delivered, it developed a tractive effort of 60,000 lbf (270 kN)), not as powerful as the South African Railways GMA/M 4-8-2+2-8-4 Garratts of 1954, which developed a tractive effort of 60,700 lbf (270 kN). Following modifications in 1958 to thirty AD60s, their tractive effort was increased to 63,016 lbf (280.31 kN). These locomotives remained in service until the early 1970s with a replacement "6042" using the boiler cradle of 6043 (The original was scrapped in 1968) the last withdrawn in February 1973. Oberg wrote he witnessed an AD60 clear a dead 1220-tonne double-headed diesel freight (total weight 1450 tonnes) from a 1 in 55 grade without wheel slip. Four AD60's survive today: 6029 (which operates occasionally out of Thirlmere), 6039 (under private ownership at Dorrigo Museum), 6040 (on static display at THNSW, Thirlmere), & 6042 (also owned by the Dorrigo museum but sitting in the middle of a field in Forbes, NSW).

==== Queensland ====
Queensland Railways operated 30 Beyer Garratt locomotives. These were mainly based in the Rockhampton area.

==== South Australia ====
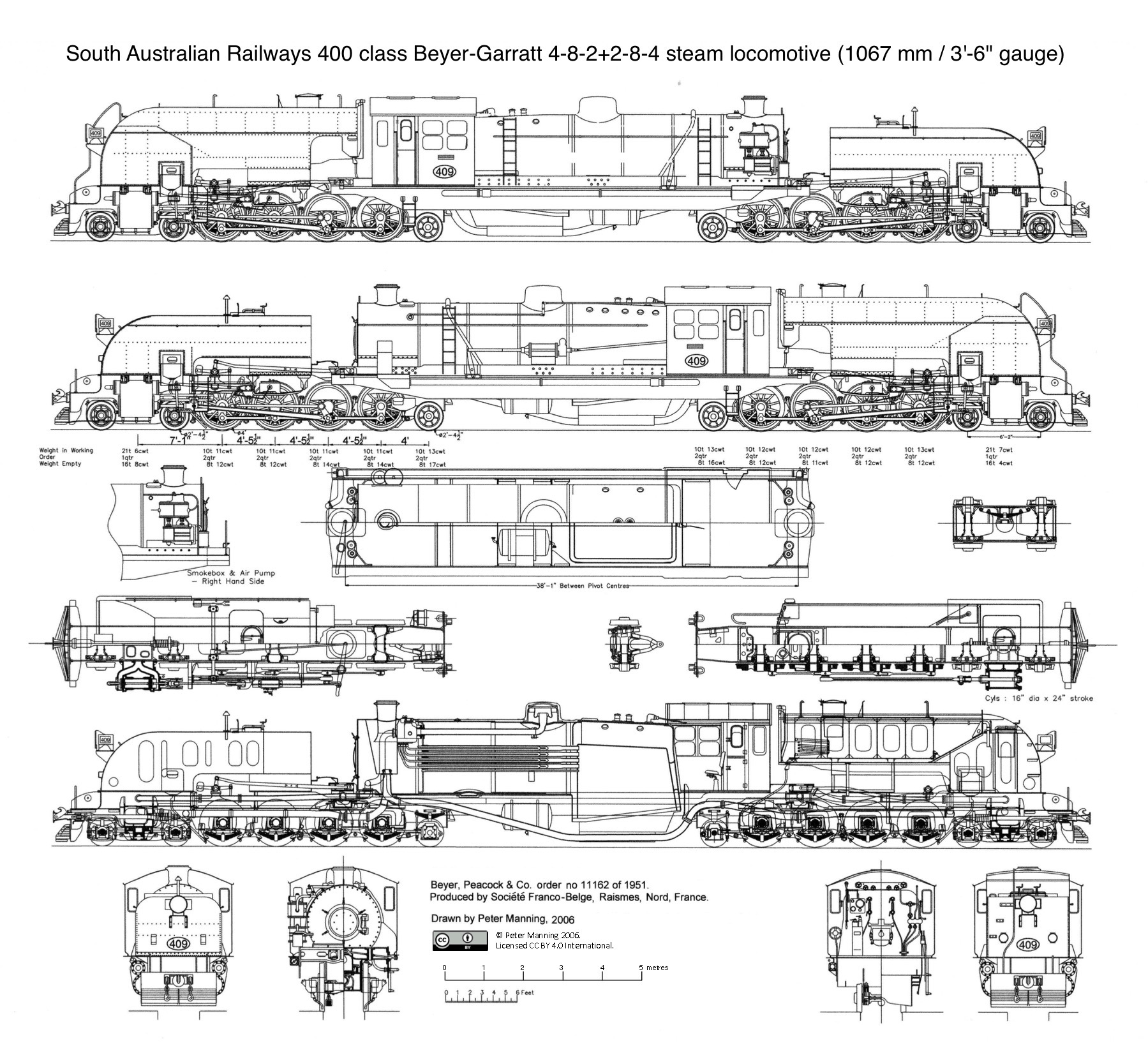
The South Australian Railways 400 class

One of ten Garratts delivered in 1953 to the South Australian Railways – number 409 – is on static display at the National Railway Museum, Port Adelaide, South Australia. The locomotives were ordered in 1951 from Beyer, Peacock & Company, when there was a need for more and bigger motive power to haul the heavy ore trains on the 1,067 mm (3 ft 6 in) narrow-gauge line between Broken Hill and Port Pirie. The company subsequently subcontracted the order, with main specifications identical to those of the notable 60th class of the East African Railways, to Société Franco-Belge, its European associate based in Raismes.

By 1955, the 400 class had taken over most of the working of the Broken Hill line. They operated as oil-burners, with provision for a mechanical stoker to be installed if converted to burn coal. They were also designed to be easily converted for service on either the broad or standard gauge. They were superseded by diesel power in 1963.

==== Tasmania ====
Following the success of the K class Garratts on the North East Dundas Tramway, the Tasmanian Government Railways imported Beyer, Peacock Garratts for their main lines, in particular the 4-4-2+2-4-4 M class for express passenger work. These were the only eight-cylinder Garratts. The M1 achieved a world speed record of 55 miles per hour (89 km/h) on 30 November 1912. Their 5-foot (1.5 m) diameter driving wheels were at the time the largest on any narrow-gauge locomotive in Australia. Their eight cylinders proved a nightmare to maintain, and after several fatal and disastrous derailments in the late 1920s, mainly due to inadequate trackwork, they were withdrawn and scrapped.

==== Victoria ====
Victorian Railways operated two Beyer Garratts, used on the Crowes and Walhalla narrow-gauge railway lines. The two engines were classified as G class, numbered G41 and G42; the latter engine has been restored. It is currently in use at the Puffing Billy Railway near Melbourne. It was not used in public service on that line prior to the preservation era. Fyansford Cement Works operated a 3'6" gauge line, with an ASG (G33) and 2 Garratts (No.1 and No.2) similar in design to the WAGR Ms class, although these 2 were not designated any class of their own. No.1 was scrapped but No.2 and G33 are preserved at the Bellarine Railway, with G33 currently undergoing restoration work.

==== New Zealand ====
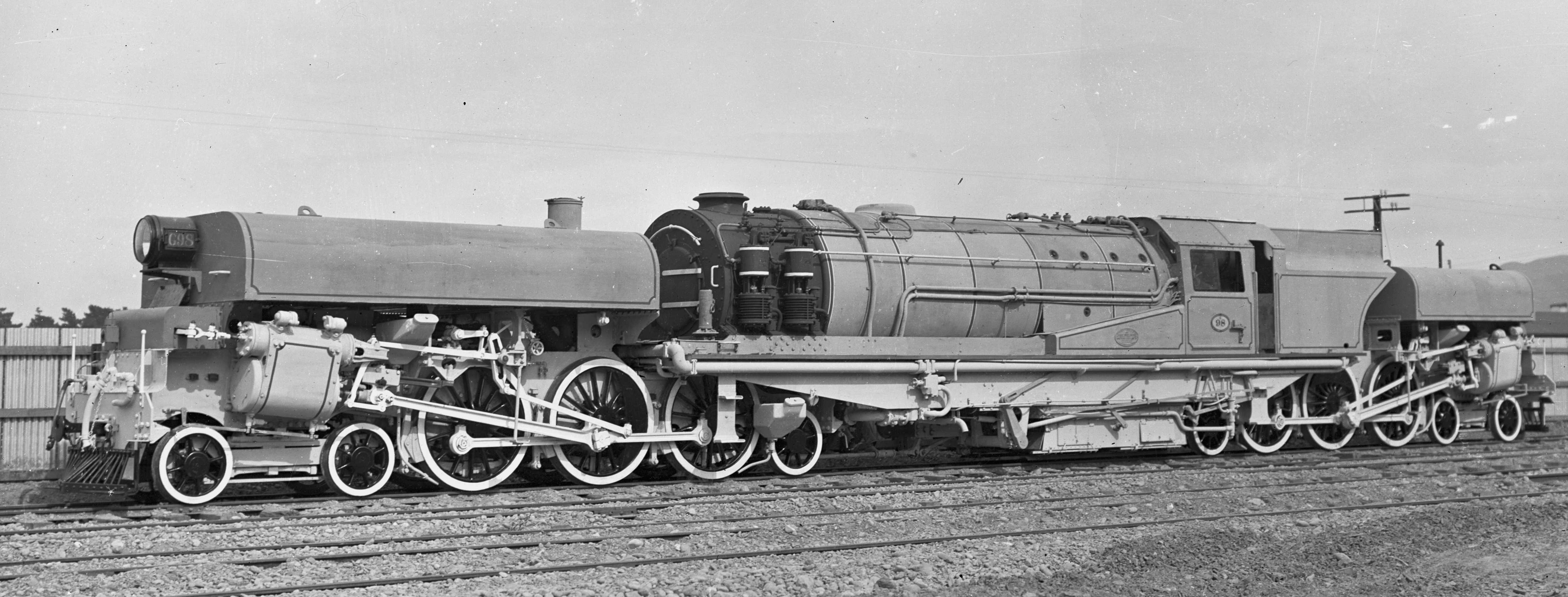
A NZR G class Garratt locomotive

Beyer, Peacock built three 4-6-2+2-6-4 NZR G class locomotives in 1928, which were too powerful for the system and had complicated valve mechanisms. Unusually, these engines had three cylinders (24 in × 16.5 in or 610 mm × 420 mm) each, on two sets of engine frames, thus creating a six-cylinder Garratt; they were the second and final Garratts to employ this arrangement, the other being the one-off LNER U1. They entered service in 1929. Walschaerts valve gear operated the outside cylinders with the inner third cylinder linked by a Gresley conjugated valve gear. Photos verify the coal bunker was carried on an extension to the boiler frame rather than on the rear engine frame, as with most Garratts. The engines delivered 51,580 lbf (229.44 kN) of tractive effort, which was too powerful for the drawbars on the rolling stock. After a few years they were rebuilt as six Pacifics, also unsuccessful, but which saw nearly twenty years of service.

Though no NZR Garratts survived, three preserved imported African Garratts are in New Zealand: Rhodesia Railways class 15A No. 398 of the Flying 15 Trust, Pakakarakiki, class 14A No. 509 of Mainline Steam Trust Plimmerton (under restoration), and South African Railways GMAM class No. 4083 at Mercer Auckland with the Mainline Steam Trust awaiting restoration. When it first arrived in NZ in the 1990s, it was steamed and ran in their former Parnell Depot yard. See preservation below.

=== Europe ===
Garratts were mainly employed in Great Britain, Russia, and Spain, where some five railway companies employed seven classes. These included the 1931 order for Central of Aragon Railway for six 4-6-2+2-6-4 "Double Pacific" Garratts for fast passenger service. In addition a Dutch and a Belgian tramway also operated one or more engines based on and built to the Garratt design.

==== Netherlands ====
In 1931, the Dutch Limburgsche Tramweg Maatschappij (LTM) 'Limburg tramway company' ordered a single standard gauge Garratt, numbered LTM 51, from Henschel (Germany) with builder's number 22063. This design was slightly different in that the coal bunker was located on the boiler frame and both machines only holding the watertanks. More importantly, it was the only Garratt with inside cylinders. The wheel arrangement was C+C (0-6-0+0-6-0). Due to abandonment of the line in 1938, the locomotive was sold to a metal merchant, who in turn sold it to an engineers' bureau, that sold it in 1941 to Germany. Further whereabouts of this machine are unknown, but it is presumed scrapped.

==== Spain ====
Spain had a varied collection of Garratts from most builders; Beyer, Peacock themselves only building a pair of 3 ft 6 in (1,067 mm) 2-6-2+2-6-2s for Rio Tinto in 1929. The first Garratts in Spain, however, were four metre gauge 2-6-0+0-6-2s built for the Ferrocarriles Catalanes in 1922 by Sociéte Anonyme St. Leonard of Liége, Belgium. Four more followed in 1925. Also on the metre gauge, La Robla railway bought two pairs of 2-6-2+2-6-2s, the first from Hanomag of Germany in 1929, the second from Babcock & Wilcox of Bilbao in 1931. The Compania Minera de Sierra Minera also bought a pair of metre-gauge 2-6-2+2-6-2s in 1930.

On the broad gauge, the Central of Aragon Railway bought six 2-8-2+2-8-2s from Babcock & Wilcox and six 4-6-2+2-6-4s from Euskalduna of Bilbao, both in 1931. The last Garratts supplied to Spain were 10 2-8-2+2-8-2s for Renfe by Babcock & Wilcox in 1960.

==== United Kingdom ====
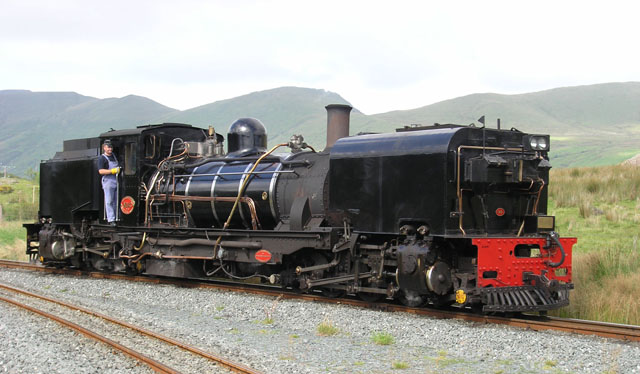
South African Railways 2 ft (610 mm) gauge NG G16 class Garratt on the Welsh Highland Railway

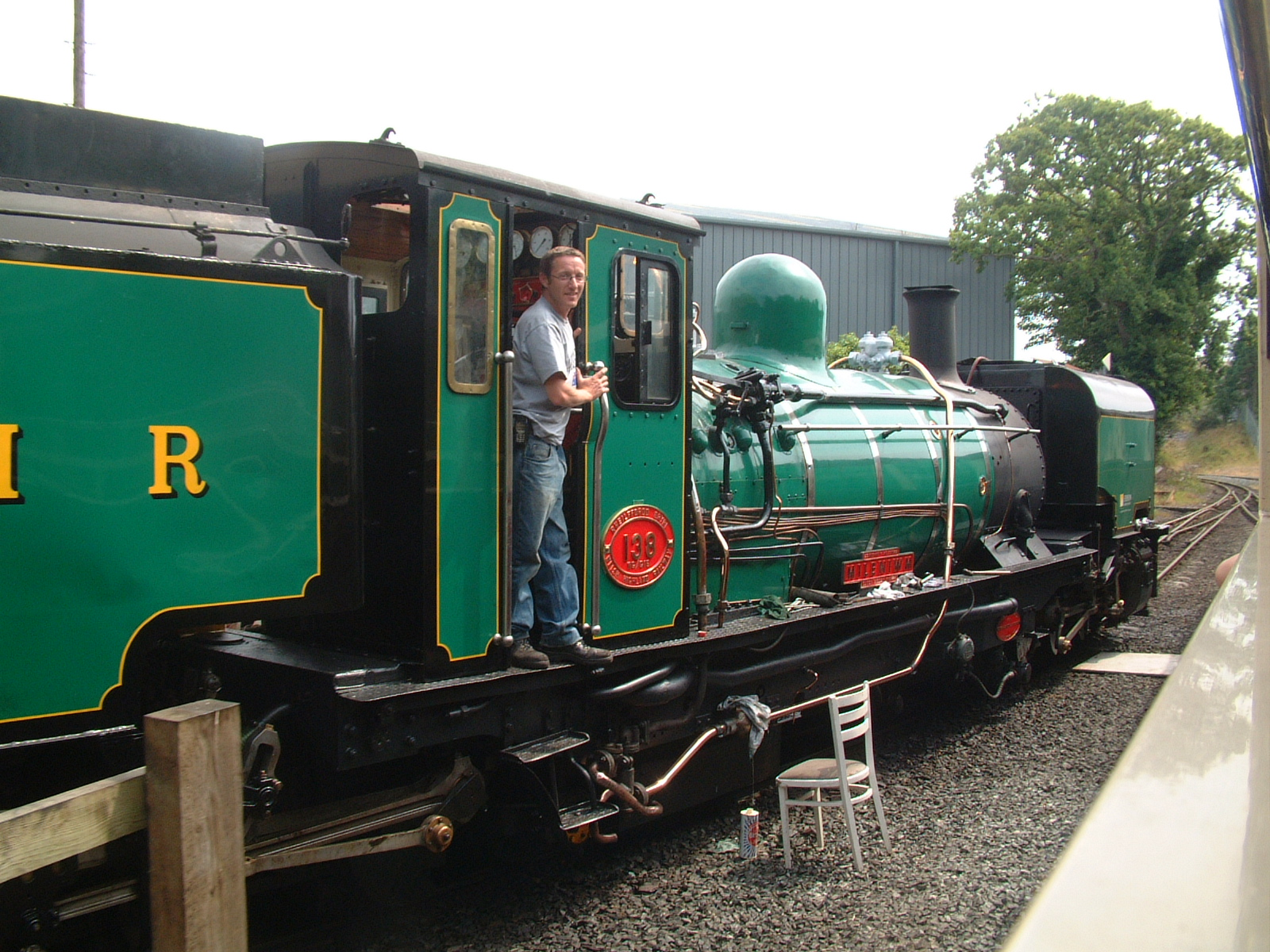
WHR NG138 at Dinas, 2003

British usage of Garratts was minimal. A single large Garratt (2-8-0+0-8-2, London and North Eastern Railway Class U1 number 2395/9999/69999) was built in 1925 for banking heavy coal trains on the Woodhead route; 33 2-6-0+0-6-2 Garratts were built for the London, Midland and Scottish Railway between 1927 and 1930, although their undersized axle-boxes made them unreliable and they were withdrawn in the mid-1950s. They were also trialled unsuccessfully on the Lickey Incline between Bromsgrove and Birmingham.

Four standard-gauge Garratt locomotives were supplied by Beyer, Peacock for industrial service in the UK. One survived and is preserved at Bressingham Steam Museum. No. 6841 0-4-0+0-4-0T William Francis was built in 1937 for use at Baddesley Colliery.

On the Welsh Highland Railway, a 1 ft 11 1/2 in (597 mm) narrow-gauge tourist line in Wales, a few imported South African NGG16 Garratts haul the greater part of service trains on the railway.

==== USSR ====
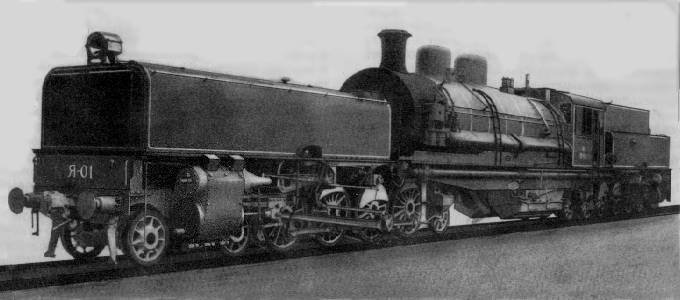
Soviet Ya.01 class 4-8-2+2-8-4 Garratt

Beyer, Peacock constructed the largest steam locomotive built in Europe, a 4-8-2+2-8-4 for the USSR, works order number 1176, in 1932. The locomotive had the Russian classification Ya.01 (Я.01). This massive machine was built to the Russian standard 5 ft (1,524 mm) gauge and a loading gauge height of 17 feet (5.2 m). It underwent extensive testing and proved to be very able to operate in extremely low temperatures, due to adequate protection of the external plumbing between boiler and engine units. This may have been the lowest temperature operation of a Garratt type. The locomotive was used for a number of years for coal traffic in the Donbass region, but was never replicated. This decision appears to be a combination of unfamiliar maintenance processes and politics.

=== North America ===
No Garratts appeared in North America, although the American Locomotive Company became the sole licensee to build Garratts there. Alco was unable to garner sufficient interest from US railroads to produce even a prototype or demonstrator. This reluctance was reportedly based on a concern that tractive effort and factor of adhesion would suffer as the weight of water and fuel over the driving wheels diminished.

==== United States ====
In 1975, one 2-6-2+2-6-2 Garratt NG class No. 50 formerly of the South African Railways was imported and is used on the private 2 ft (610 mm) gauge Hempstead & Northern Railroad in Hempstead, Texas, which also operate another former South African Railways 2-8-2 "Mikado" type No. 18.

=== South America ===
==== Argentina ====
The British-owned 5 ft 6 in (1,676 mm) gauge Buenos Aires Great Southern Railway operated twelve Garratt 4-8-2+2-8-4 oil-fired locomotives, numbers 4851–4862, built by Beyer, Peacock in 1929. They were used on the Bahía Blanca North Western section, particularly on the Toay line), on the main Bahía Blanca North Western line to General Pico, and between Tres Arroyos and Bahía Blanca. They were withdrawn in the 1950s due to the rapid decline in freight traffic caused by the increasing competition from road transport.

Other British-owned railway companies in Argentina operated Garratt locomotives built by Beyer, Peacock:

- Argentine North Eastern Railway (4 ft 8 1/2 in (1,435 mm) gauge): seven 2-6-0+0-6-2 locomotives built 1925–1927 and three 4-4-2+2-4-4, built 1930
- Argentine Transandine (1,000 mm (3 ft 3 3/8 in) gauge): four 2-6-2+2-6-2, built 1930
- Buenos Aires and Pacific Railway (5 ft 6 in (1,676 mm) gauge): four 4-8-2+2-8-4, built 1929–1930
- Buenos Aires Midland Railway (1,000 mm (3 ft 3 3/8 in) gauge): two 4-6-2+2-6-4, 1930
- Cordoba Central Railway (1,000 mm gauge) : ten 4-8-2+2-8-4, built 1929
- Entre Rios Railway (4 ft 8 1/2 in (1,435 mm) gauge): five 2-6-0+0-6-2 and five 4-4-2+2-4-4, built 1927

The Southern Fuegian Railway at Ushuaia uses two 500 mm (19 3/4 in) gauge Garratts to haul tourist trains.

==== Bolivia ====
Three meter gauge 4-8-2+2-8-4 were delivered to the Antofagasta and Bolivia Railway in 1929, followed by six more in 1950.

==== Brazil ====
In Brazil after 1927, the São Paulo Railway operated broad-gauge 4-6-2+2-6-4] Garratts that ran passenger trains at 70 mph.

==== Colombia ====
In Colombia, one 914 mm (3 ft) gauge 4-6-2+2-6-4 Garratt was purchased by the FC Pacifico in 1924 and two more by the La Dorada in 1937.

==== Peru ====
Four 2-8-2+2-8-2 standard gauge Garratts were delivered to the Central Railway of Peru from 1929 to 1931. (Donald Binns, The Central Railway of Peru and The Cerro de Pasco Railway, 1996)

== War locomotives ==
During World War II, several Garratt designs were built to meet the wartime needs of narrow-gauge railways in Africa, Asia, and Australia.

Six 2-6-2+2-6-2 Garratts were built for the 2 ft 6 in (762 mm) gauge Sierra Leone Government Railway in 1942, to a design first supplied to that railway in 1926. Five of the older Garratts were converted to a 2-8-0+0-8-2 wheel arrangement to increase their tractive effort.

Seventy Garratts were constructed by Beyer, Peacock for the War Department, to three standard designs. A 2-8-2+2-8-2 based on the South African Railways GE class was constructed on 3 ft 6 in (1,067 mm) gauge for West Africa and Rhodesia, while a heavier class of 4-8-2+2-8-4 was constructed for East African Railways. A lighter metre-gauge 4-8-2+2-8-4 was constructed for India, Burma, and East Africa. This design was particularly successful, and was the basis for several postwar classes.

The Australian Standard Garratt was designed in 1942, for use on 3 ft 6 in (1,067 mm) gauge railways, in the critical period of World War II following the Japanese bombing of Darwin in 1942, and aerial attacks on other northern Australian centres. It was a 4-8-2+2-8-4 locomotive, designed in Australia and constructed by a number of Australian railway workshops. Several design problems with the class emerged, and use of the locomotive encountered resistance from the drivers' union, especially in Queensland. Most were withdrawn at the end of the war, although a number continued to operate successfully in Tasmania.

== Preservation ==
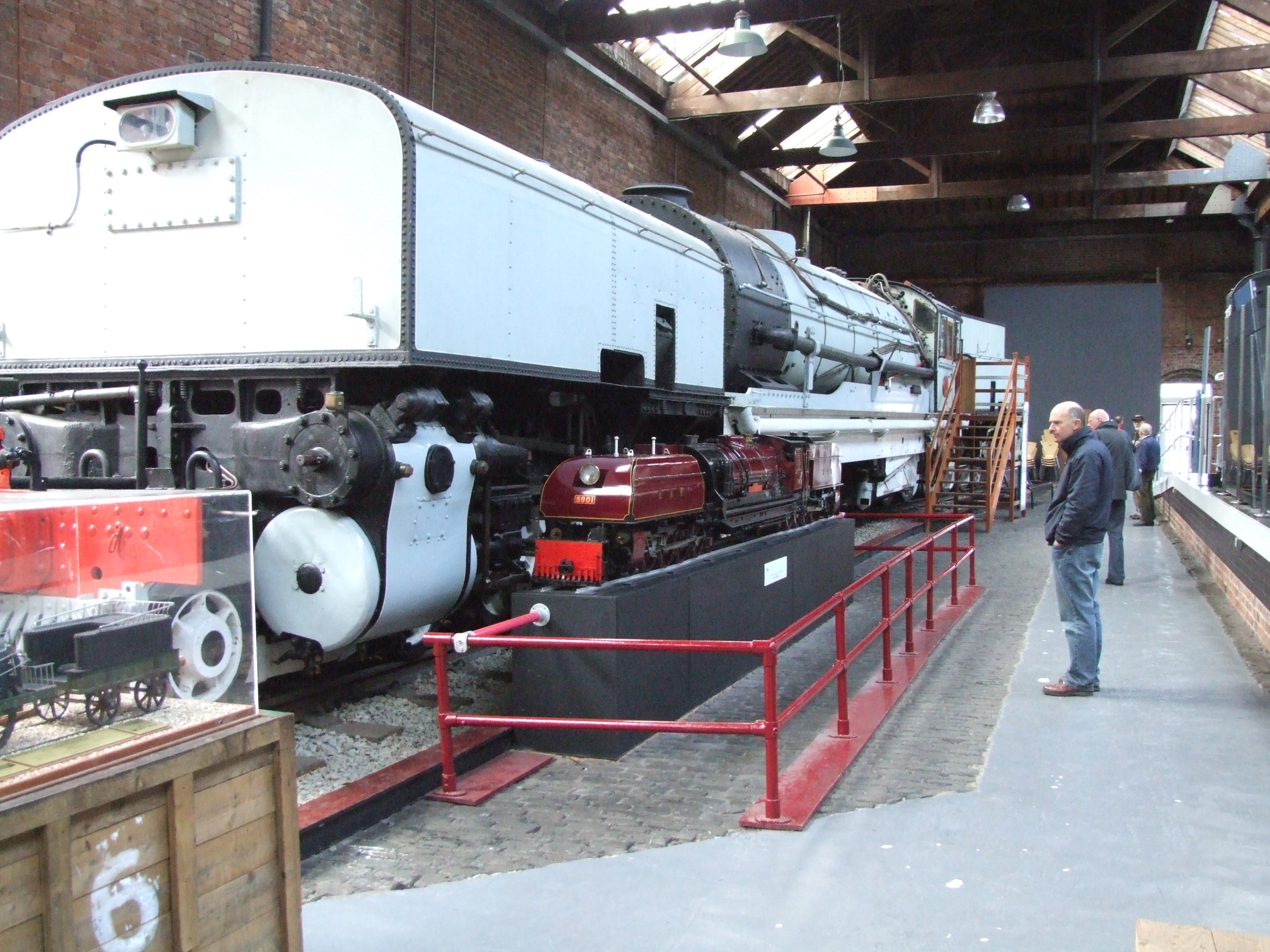
Preserved South African Railways class GL Beyer-Garratt locomotive no 2352 at the Museum of Science and Industry, Manchester, 2010

About 250 Garratts may exist today. However, many are dumped in varying states of disrepair in remoter parts of the world, and the number that may be likely to survive has been estimated as fewer than 100. As of 2019, about 15 operating Garratt locomotives can be found in Europe, Africa, Argentina, the US and Australia.

The first Garratt locomotive, the K class of the North East Dundas Tramway, has been preserved. After the line closed in 1929 the locomotives were put up for sale. K1 was purchased by Beyer, Peacock in 1947 for their museum. The preserved locomotive has parts from both original engines. When Beyer, Peacock ceased trading, the locomotive was sold to the Ffestiniog Railway, who initially proposed to cut it down to meet their loading gauge. For a number of years it was on loan to the National Railway Museum and was exhibited in York. In 1995 it was removed from York to commence restoration in Birmingham. It was returned to Wales in 2000 where restoration was continued at the Ffestiniog Railway workshops at Boston Lodge. It was fitted with a new boiler and restored to full running order on the Welsh Highland Railway by September 2008. The Welsh Highland Railway owns several former South African SAR NGG 16 Class Garratts, and operates both the first (K1) and last (NG/G16 143) Garratts constructed by Beyer, Peacock.. The K1 ten year boiler ticket expired in 2014. Even though the locomotive had worked infrequently, a full boiler overhaul was required to meet UK regulations. The FR/WHR declined to fund this activity, citing lack of revenue generating opportunities for the locomotive and the need to maintain their core fleet of NG/G16 locomotives. Finally, in 2019 it was decided to move the locomotive to the Statfold Barn Railway in Central England on a ten year loan with two boiler overhauls in the agreement. The first boiler overhaul was quickly completed along with other work at a cost of 60,000 GBP and the locomotive seen in steam at Statfold in February 2020.

In Spain, a 2-8-2+2-8-2 number 282F-0421, nicknamed "Garrafeta", occasionally ran in the Lleida area but no longer. An enormous 4-6-2+2-6-4, number 462F-0401, is under slow cosmetic restoration. Both locomotives are managed by ARMF, a non-profit organisation which also holds the only main line repair workshop for historical railway vehicles on broad gauge network.

A single Hanomag-built narrow gauge example exists in the USA located in Hempstead Texas. It has been made operational again since November 2015.

Several Australian Garratts have been restored to operating condition. G 42, formerly used on the narrow gauge lines of the Victorian Railways, works regularly on the Puffing Billy Railway in the Dandenong Ranges outside Melbourne. The Puffing Billy Railway is also rebuilding ex SAR NG/G16 129 which entered service in late 2019. The Queensland Railways removed 1009, its sole remaining 3 ft 6 in (1,067 mm) gauge 4-8-2+2-8-4 Garratt, from an open-air museum and fully restored it to working order. It was out of service by December 2007, awaiting a new boiler. NSWGR AD60 6029 was restored to operating condition in Canberra. As of 2018, 6029 is privately owned and is stored at Thirlmere, NSW. It is occasionally used by the NSW Rail Museum on mainline excursions. 3'6" Garratts No.2 and G33 from Fyansford Cement Works are both preserved with the Bellarine Railway, with G33 undergoing restoration work and No.2 in storage.

In Kenya, East African Railways 59 class 5918 was maintained in operating condition from 2001 to 2011. Likewise in Zimbabwe 20th class 730 and 740 were held in operating condition until 2004. They have not run since 2004 when 730 was briefly used on Bulawayo commuter services. None are likely to operate again without external funding for major repairs as the only work available for them are excursion trains for foreign tourists and rail enthusiasts.

No New Zealand Railways G class Garratts survived, but three more modern Southern African Garratts have been imported for restoration in New Zealand, with No.509's boiler certified and restoration nearing completion as of 2018.

- Beyer Peacock No.7340 of 1950 Rhodesia Railways class 15A No.398 The Flying Fifteen Group, Steam Incorporated Paekakariki (stored).
- Beyer Peacock No.7582 of 1953 Rhodesia Railways class 14A No.509. Mainline Steam Heritage Trust, Plimmerton (under restoration).
- Beyer Peacock No. 7681 of 1956 South African Railways GMAM class No.4083 Mainline Steam Heritage Trust, Mercer (stored).

In December 2007, Zimbabwe class 14A Garratt number 509, overhauled in Bulawayo was offloaded in New Zealand for operational preservation by the Mainline Steam trust. In early 2011 Zimbabwe 15th class 398 was also delivered to New Zealand for restoration to operating condition by Steam Inc.

As of December 2020 there is only one place in the world where one can with reasonable confidence view a Garratt in daily operating service. Ushuaia, Argentina whilst Dinas in North Wales offers the sight of daily operation for about 10 months of the year.

In September 2018, South Eastern Zone of Indian Railways made a successful trial run of a Beyer-Garratt numbered 811 from Kharagpur. A heritage service is planned and scheduled to start from the upcoming festival season.

== In fiction ==
In the movie Big World! Big Adventures! of the television programme, Thomas & Friends, an EAR 59 class Garratt named Kwaku was introduced.

== See also ==
- 2 ft gauge railways in South Africa

== Sources ==
- Atkins, P. (1999). The golden age of steam locomotive building. Atlantic. ISBN 978-0906899878.
- Bell, A. Morton (1935). Locomotives : their construction, maintenance and operation, with notes on electric, internal combustion and other forms of motive power. Virtue & Company Limited.
- Cooper, Greg; Goss, Grant (1996). Tasmanian railways 125 years, 1871-1996 : a pictorial history. CG Publishing Co. ISBN 978-0-646-27633-5.
- Durrant, A E (1969). The Garratt Locomotive. David & Charles Locomotive Studies. Newton Abbott, Devon, UK: David & Charles. OCLC 729984551.
- Durrant, A E (1981). Garratt Locomotives of the World (rev. and enl. ed.). Newton Abbot, England: David & Charles. ISBN 0-7153-7641-1. OCLC 9326294.
- Le Fleming, H. M.; Price, John Horace (1960). Russian steam locomotives. J. Marshbank.
- Glancey, Jonathan (2012). Giants of Steam: the Great Men and Machines of Rail's Golden Age. Atlantic Books. ISBN 978-184354769-3.
- Hollingsworth, Brian; Cook, Arthur (1987). The Great Book of Trains. Lifetime Distributors. ISBN 0-86101-919-9.
- Hughes, Hugh (1992). Indian Locomotives: Part 2 – Metre Gauge 1872–1940. Harrow, Middlesex: The Continental Railway Circle. ISBN 0-9503469-9-3. OCLC 26549293.
- Hughes, Hugh (1994). Indian Locomotives: Part 3 – Narrow Gauge 1863–1940. Harrow, Middlesex: The Continental Railway Circle. ISBN 0-9521655-0-3. OCLC 39496543.
- Hughes, Hugh (1996). Indian Locomotives: Part 4 – 1941–1990. Harrow, Middlesex: The Continental Railway Circle. ISBN 0-9521655-1-1. OCLC 35135033.
- Oberg, Leon (1975). Locomotives of Australia. A.H. and A.W. Reed. ISBN 978-0-589-07173-8.
- Paxton, Leith; Bourne, David (1985). Locomotives of the South African Railways (1st ed.). Cape Town: Struik. ISBN 0869772112.
- Purdom, Douglas Stewart (1977). British steam on the pampas : the locomotives of the Buenos Aires Great Southern Railway. Mechanical Engineering Publications. ISBN 978-0-85298-353-9.
- Rakov, V. A. (Vitaliĭ Aleksandrovich) (1995). Lokomotivy otechestvennykh zheleznykh dorog 1845-1955 [Locomotives of Domestic Railways] (2nd ed.). ISBN 978-5-277-00821-8.
- Stewart, W. W. (1970). When steam was king. Reed. ISBN 978-0-589-00382-1. OCLC 117501.
- Turner, J. M.; Ellis, R. F. (1992). The Antofagasta (Chili) & Bolivia Railway : the story of the FCAB and its locomotives. Locomotives International. ISBN 978-0-907941-36-1.
- Ziel, Ron; Eagleson, Mike (1973). The twilight of world steam. Madison Square Press. ISBN 978-0-448-02432-5.
