= Herbert William Garratt =

English locomotive inventor (1864–1913)

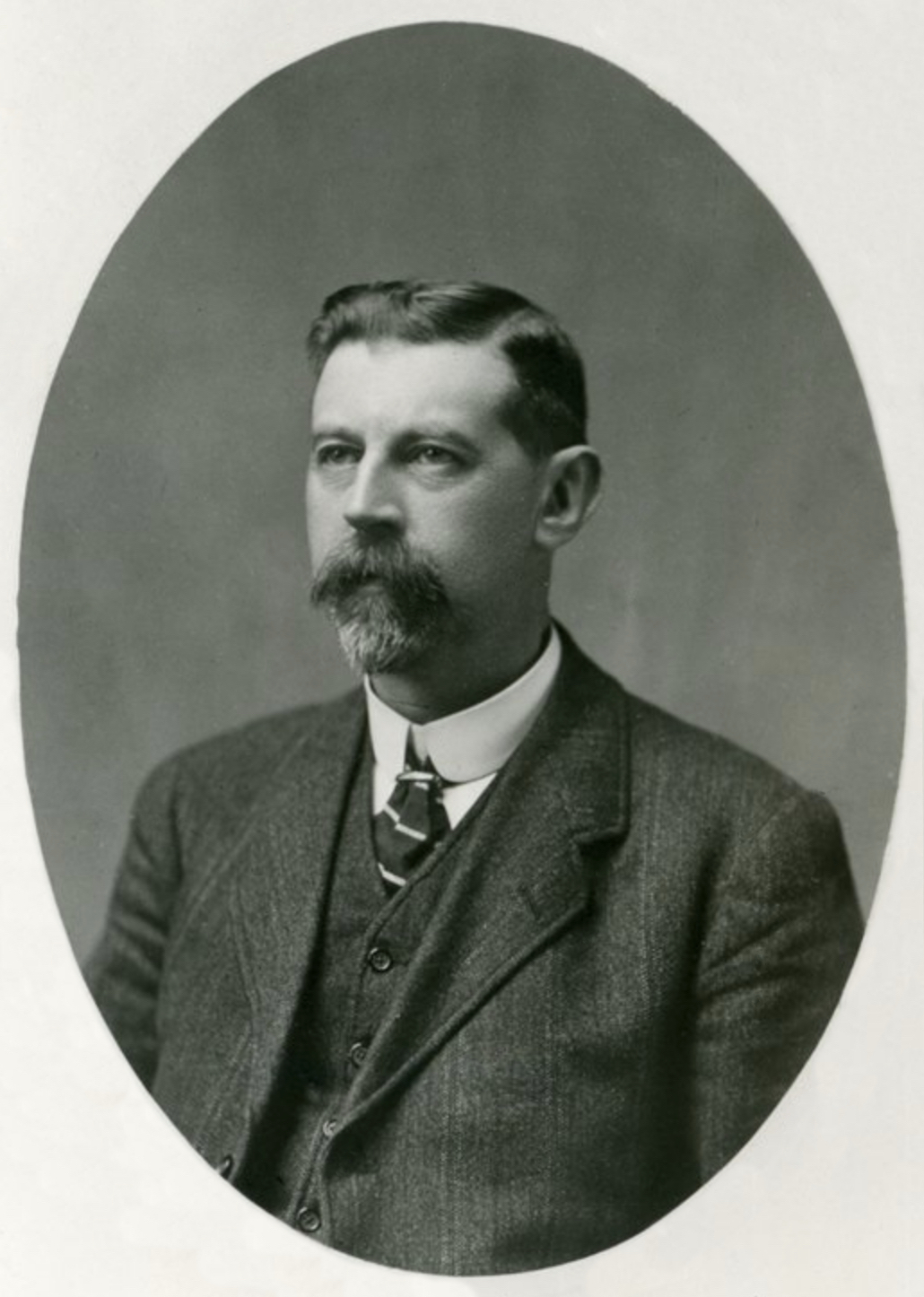
- Born: Herbert William Garratt; 8 June 1864; London, United Kingdom
- Died: 25 September 1913 (aged 49); Richmond (Surrey) (UK Parliament constituency)
- Known for: Inventing the Garratt locomotive

Herbert William Garratt (8 June 1864 – 25 September 1913) was an English mechanical engineer and the inventor of the Garratt system of articulated locomotives.

Garratt began his engineering career by serving an apprenticeship under John Carter Park, locomotive superintendent of the North London Railway, from 1879 to 1882 at the Bow works. He gained further experience at Doxford's marine engineering works in Sunderland and later as an inspector for Sir Charles Fox and Sir Alexander Rendel. Garratt joined the Argentine Central Railway in 1889, where he became Locomotive Superintendent in 1892, and between 1900 and 1906 he worked for railways in Cuba, Lagos and Lima (Peru). In 1902, Garratt was elected to membership of the Institution of Mechanical Engineers. He returned to England in 1906, taking on a role inspecting locomotives built for the New South Wales Government Railways by British manufacturers.

== Design and impact of Garratt locomotives ==
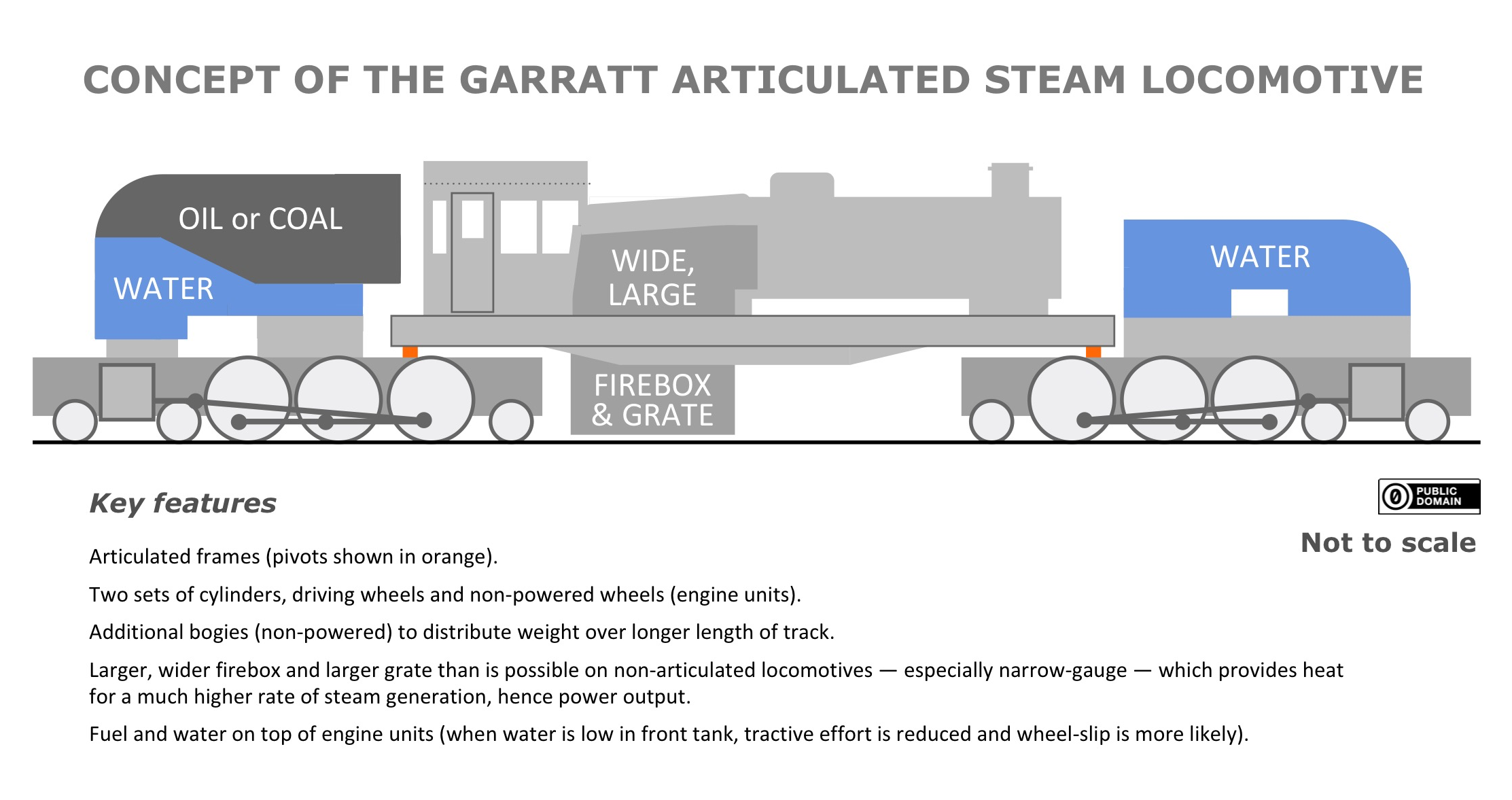
Key components of the Garratt locomotive design

Garratt was granted a patent for an innovative locomotive design in 1908, subsequently known as the "Garratt". Beyer, Peacock & Company purchased sole rights of manufacture in Britain. After the patents ran out in 1928, the company began to use the name "Beyer-Garratt" to distinguish the locomotives they had manufactured.

Garratt's design for an articulated steam locomotive featured an engine unit at each end carrying coal and water supplies, and a boiler unit suspended between them on pivots. The design was deployed in many regions throughout Africa, South America, South-east Asia, Australia and New Zealand. In these regions, difficult terrain often prevailed, adding to construction costs. Usually the railway lines suffered from low load-bearing capacity because they had been built cheaply; Garratt locomotives, with their weight usually distributed over 12 to 16 driving wheels and 8 to 16 non-driving wheels, minimised destructive forces on rails. Additionally, because they were articulated, they could generally traverse sharper curves than non-articulated locomotives. Their higher ability to penetrate previously impassable regions often had the effect of increasing human and economic interactions between settlements, reducing the isolated nature of previously remote areas of the world.

Garratt locomotives were particularly effective on narrow gauge railway lines not only because of their flexibility: the size of their fireboxes below the "bridge" between the two engine units was constrained only by the lateral distance between the bridge frames – much greater than the distance between the narrow frames of non-articulated locomotives. (Note: The firebox space between locomotive frames on a non-articulated locomotive built for 2 ft 6 ins (762 mm) gauge, for example, is only about 40 per cent of the space on a 4 ft 8 1/2 ins (1435 mm) standard gauge locomotive.) This greatly increased the capacity to generate steam, on which power output depended. High efficiency compared with that of fixed-frame locomotives reduced the numbers of locomotives per train, allowed much heavier trains, and averted the need to convert rail lines to a wider gauge – an incentive for further rail network and economic expansion.

== Bibliography ==
- Herbert William Garratt. Retrieved 9 February 2005.
- Beyer Peacock Garratt Locomotives. Retrieved 4 December 2007.
- Durrant, A E (1969). The Garratt Locomotive. David & Charles Locomotive Studies. Newton Abbott, Devon, UK: David & Charles. OCLC 729984551.
