= WAGR Msa class =

Class of Australian 2-6-0+0-6-2 locomotives

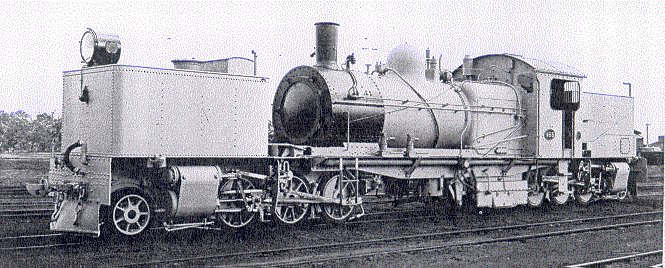
- Works photo of Msa468, taken in 1930.
Type and origin
- Power type: Steam
- Builder: Midland Railway Workshops
- Serial number: 46–55
- Build date: 1930
- Total produced: 10
Specifications
- Configuration
  - Whyte: 2-6-0+0-6-2 (Garratt)
  - UIC: (1′C)(C1′) h4t
- Gauge: 3 ft 6 in (1,067 mm)
- Driver dia.: 39 in (991 mm)
- Adhesive weight: 60 tonnes (59 long tons; 66 short tons)
- Loco weight: 74 tonnes (73 long tons; 82 short tons)
- Firebox
  - Grate area: 27 sq ft (2.5 m^{2})
- Boiler pressure: 160 lbf/in^{2} (1.10 MPa)
- Heating surface: 1,088 sq ft (101.1 m^{2})
- Superheater
  - Heating area: 180 sq ft (17 m^{2})
- Cylinders: 4 (Garratt)
- Cylinder size: 13.25 in × 20 in (337 mm × 508 mm)
Performance figures
- Tractive effort: 24,489 lbf (108.93 kN)
- Factor of adh.: 4.9
Career
- Operators: Western Australian Government Railways
- Numbers: Msa466–Msa475 (later Msa491–Msa500)
- Withdrawn: 1962-1963
- Current owner: all scrapped

The WAGR Msa class was a class of 2-6-0+0-6-2 Garratt articulated steam locomotives. The class was built at the Midland Railway Workshops and operated by the Western Australian Government Railways (WAGR) between 1930 and 1963. It was the first Garatt type to be designed and constructed entirely in Australia.

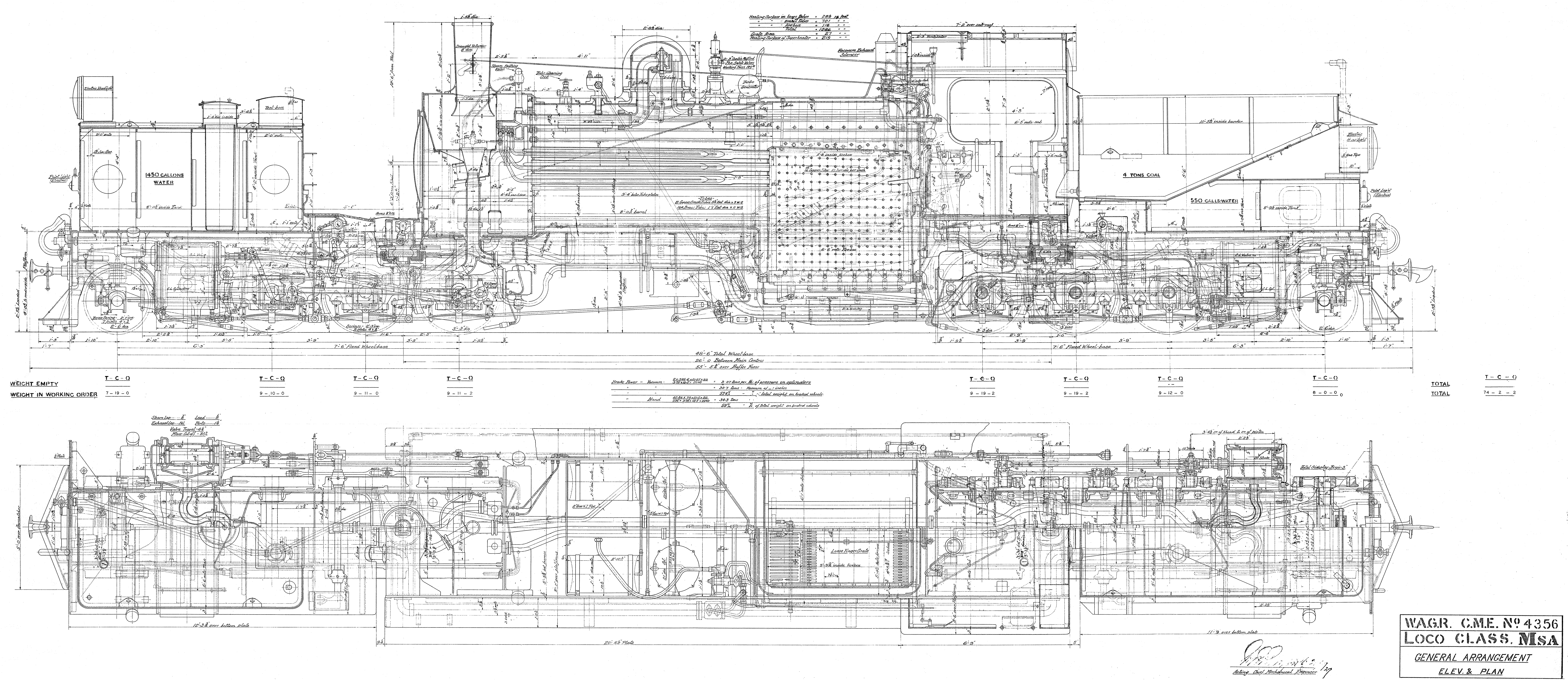
Class Msa Garratt articulated steam locomotive

== History ==
The class was preceded on the WAGR system by the M/Ms class Garratts. The class were used extensively on WAGR lines with light rails and sharp curves, as a consequence many of the smaller older branch lines on the Darling Scarp; as well as those with steep inclines such as those on the Mundaring Weir, Nannup, and Flinders Bay lines. In their later years, the boiler pressure was reduced to match that of the M/Ms class. By this stage they had been concentrated on the Bunbury to Boyup Brook and Pinjarra to Boddington lines.

Contrary to popular belief, the last Msa was not accidentally cut up. In 1951, the Commissioner of Railways issued a directive to the Chief Mechanical Engineer not to cut up any written off locomotives and retain a "strategic reserve" in case they were required for future increases in traffic. In the ensuing years the directive was not strictly adhered to, though Ministerial approval was required before locomotives could be disposed of, which allowed many steam locomotives to survive long enough to be preserved. In 1964, the Commissioner reaffirmed the 1951 directive. A number of locomotives were approved for scrapping in February 1964, though it was specified that Msa, Ds, Es and U Class locomotives be retained, and "NOT TO BE CUT UP" was painted on the locomotives.

In 1965, Rail Heritage WA sent a letter to the WAGR requesting an Msa be retained for preservation. However, the Chief Mechanical Engineer at the time, Sidney Griffiths, believed the Msa was not a successful design and the WAGR refused to offer an example for preservation. Griffiths worked as a draftsman under Frederick Mills on the design of the MSA and later noted that when designing the locomotive there was a directive from the then Chief Mechanical Engineer, Ernest Alfred Evans, to make the firebox of the MSA one foot longer than the MS Class garratt, which threw out all the firebox and boiler proportions and made it a relatively poor steamer.

The MSA were finally approved for scrapping in 1966 and the last MSA locomotive was cut up in 1967.

== Class list ==
The numbers and periods in service of each member of the Msa class were as follows:

Builder's number	First number	Second number	In service	Renumbered	Withdrawn	Notes
46	466	491	22 February 1930	22 September 1947	7 October 1963	Stowed 3 April 1962
47	467	492	22 February 1930	16 November 1949	7 October 1963	
48	468	493	26 April 1930	29 July 1948	7 October 1963	Stowed 20 September 1961
49	469	494	31 May 1930	1 November 1947	7 October 1963	Stowed 8 November 1961
50	470	495	28 June 1930	2 October 1947	7 October 1963	
51	471	496	19 July 1930	1 October 1947	7 October 1963	Stowed 27 September 1959
52	472	497	16 August 1930	11 July 1947	7 October 1963	Stowed 29 June 1961
53	473	498	13 September 1930	3 June 1948	6 September 1962	Stowed 20 January 1962
54	474	499	4 October 1930	30 April 1948	7 October 1963	Stowed 12 August 1960
55	475	500	1 November 1930	6 February 1948	7 October 1963	Stowed 14 December 1958

== See also ==
- Rail transport in Western Australia
- List of Western Australian locomotive classes
