= 2-4-2+2-4-2 =

Locomotive wheel arrangement

Equivalent classifications
- UIC class: 1B1+1B1, 1’B1’+1’B1’
- French class: 121+121
- Turkish class: 24+24
- Swiss class: 2/4+2/4, 4/8 from the 1920s
- Russian class: 1-2-1+1-2-1
First known tank engine version
- First use: 1943
- Country: Brazil
- Railway: Leopoldina Railway
- Designer: Beyer, Peacock and Company
- Builder: Beyer, Peacock and Company
- Evolved from: 2-4-0+0-4-2

Under the Whyte notation for the classification of steam locomotives by wheel arrangement, the 2-4-2+2-4-2 is a Garratt locomotive. The wheel arrangement is effectively two 2-4-2 locomotives operating back to back, with the boiler and cab suspended between the two power units. Each power unit has a single pair of leading wheels in a leading truck, followed by two coupled pairs of driving wheels, with a single pair of trailing wheels in a trailing truck.

This was the rarest of all Garratt types, with only one class of four locomotives constructed to this wheel arrangement. It most likely evolved from the 2-4-0+0-4-2 Double Porter Garratt, with the trailing wheels added on each engine unit to improve stability at speed.

== Manufacturers ==
2-4-2+2-4-2 Garratt production list – All manufacturers
| Gauge | Railway | Numbers | Works no. | Units | Year | Builder |
|---|---|---|---|---|---|---|
| 1,000 mm (3 ft 3 3/8 in) metre gauge | Leopoldina Railway, Brazil | 400-403 | 6976-6979 | 4 | 1943 | Beyer, Peacock |

== Usage ==
=== Brazil ===
All four 2-4-2+2-4-2 locomotives were built in 1943 by Beyer, Peacock and Company for the 1,000 mm (3 ft 3 3/8 in) metre gauge Leopoldina Railway in Brazil. The locomotives were allocated engine numbers in the range from 400 to 403 on that system.
