= 4-6-0+0-6-4 =

Garratt locomotive wheel arrangement

Equivalent classifications
- UIC class: 2C+C2
- French class: 230+032
- Turkish class: 35+35
- Swiss class: 3/5+3/5, 6/10 from 1920s
- Russian class: 2-3-0+0-3-2
First known tank engine version
- First use: 1912
- Country: Brazil
- Railway: Mogyana Railway
- Designer: Beyer, Peacock and Company
- Builder: Beyer, Peacock and Company

Under the Whyte notation for the classification of steam locomotives by wheel arrangement, the 4-6-0+0-6-4 is a Garratt locomotive. The wheel arrangement is effectively two 4-6-0 ten-wheeler locomotives operating back to back, with the boiler and cab suspended between the two swivelling power units. Each power unit has two pairs of leading wheels in a leading bogie, followed by three coupled pairs of driving wheels and no trailing wheels.

A similar wheel arrangement exists for simple articulated locomotives, but is referred to as 4-6-6-4. On a simple articulated locomotive, only the front engine unit swivels while the rear unit is rigid in relation to the main frame.

== Overview ==
This was a rare wheel arrangement for Garratt locomotives, with only seven locomotives built for two South American customers.

- The first was for the metre-gauge Mogyana Railway of Brazil, with five examples built by Beyer, Peacock and Company in 1912 and 1914.
- The other was two locomotives built for the 3-foot gauge Ferrocarril Pacifico de Colombia by Armstrong Whitworth in 1924.

4-6-0+0-6-4 Garratt production list – All manufacturers
| Gauge | Railway | Works no. | Units | Year | Builder |
|---|---|---|---|---|---|
| 3 ft | Ferrocarril Pacifico de Colombia | 565-566 | 2 | 1924 | Armstrong Whitworth |
| 1,000 mm | Mogyana Railway, Brazil | 5529-5530 | 2 | 1912 | Beyer, Peacock |
| 1,000 mm | Mogyana Railway, Brazil | 5787-5789 | 3 | 1914 | Beyer, Peacock |
