= Villa Elisa Historic Train =

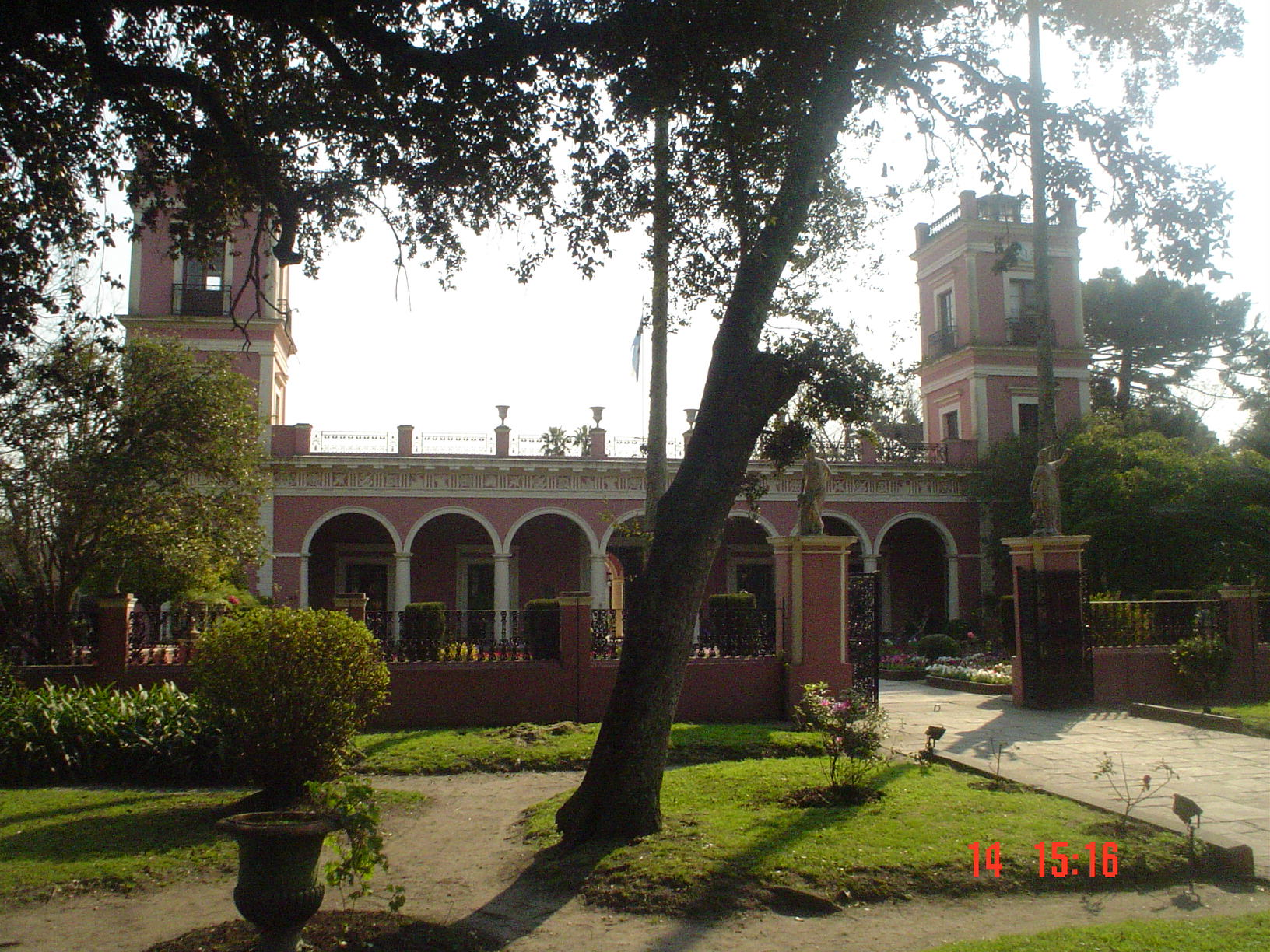
- San José palace, the main tourist attraction of the region

Overview
- Status: Active
- Locale: Entre Ríos Province
- Predecessor: Entre Ríos Railway
- First service: 1994; 31 years ago
- Current operator(s): Ferroclub Central Entrerriano

Route
- Termini: Villa Elisa; Caseros
- Distance travelled: 36 km (22 mi)
- Average journey time: 2 h
- Line(s) used: Urquiza

On-board services
- Other facilities: Bar, Shops

Technical
- Track gauge: 1,435 mm (4 ft 8 1/2 in) standard gauge

The Villa Elisa Historic Train (in Spanish: Tren Histórico de Villa Elisa) is a heritage railway of Entre Ríos Province in Argentina. The service runs trains pulled by steam locomotives between the cities of Villa Elisa, covering a distance of 36 km (22 mi). Trains run on 1,435 mm (4 ft 8 1/2 in) gauge tracks originally built by British-owned Entre Ríos Railway and currently part of General Urquiza Railway since the nationalisation of the network in 1948.

The service operates on weekends only to Primero de Mayo (4 km length), extending its route during the winter holidays to Caseros and San José palace.

== History ==
On 21 July 1907 the Entre Ríos Railway opened the 36-km line between Villa Elisa and Caseros. After the entire railway network was nationalised in 1948, Ferrocarriles Argentinos took over the line but the lack of maintenance and a decreasing number of passengers carried resulted in the line's closure in July 1980.

In the 1990s and after the Carlos Menem's administration ended all the long-distance services in Argentina (with a few exceptions), a group of enthusiasts decided to reopen the line, bringing an old 1928 Scottish steam locomotive that had been abandoned in Concepción del Uruguay. After the machine was restored, two coaches originally used by the ERR were added to the train.

The service was inaugurated and operated since then by "Ferroclub Central Entrerriano", a local non-profit association formed by railway enthusiasts. During its first years of existence, the service ran trains pulled by steam locomotives between the cities of Entre Ríos and Villa Elisa, covering a distance of 4.0 km (2.5 mi). The service was later extended to Caseros, with a total journey time of 120 minutes.

The service has been interrupted and restarted several times, most recently in 2013.

It crosses several tourist points of the province such as 1 de Mayo, Pronuciamiento and Caseros. From then on, the route is completed by bus to San José palace, the former personal residence of Justo José de Urquiza, Argentine caudillo, general, politician and President of the Argentine Confederation from 1854 to 1860.
