= North Western of Uruguay Railway =

The North Western of Uruguay Railway was one of the five original rail systems in Uruguay. The other four were the Midland Uruguay, the Central Uruguay, the Uruguay Northern, and the Uruguay East Coast Railway. The North Western of Uruguay Railway Company, Ltd. was registered In London in 1882.

The North Western system consisted of 182 kilometres (113 miles) of standard gauge railway, extending from Salto, the terminus of the Midland Uruguay Railway, in a general northerly direction to Palomas and then Isla Cabellos, where connections were made with the Uruguay Northern Railway, and Cuareim, opposite Barra do Quaraí, Brazil. Salto is opposite Concordia, Argentina, an important railway center located on the Entre Rios and Argentine North Eastern Railway lines, and some traffic was interchanged. At Cuareim, an international bridge was constructed and a third rail laid for connections with the Brazil Great Southern Railway, which ran from Quarahim, Brazil, northward. The North Western operated triweekly passenger-train service in both directions between Salto and Quarahim. Connections could be made with trains for Uruguaiana, Itaquy, and other points in southern Brazil. It served stations at Salto, Las Vinas, San Antonio, Stapevi, Palomas, Arapey, Santa Ana, Isla Cabellos, Zanja Honda, Santa Rosa, and Port Cuareim. Its major bridge traverses were over the Arapey Grande River, Lake Arapey, and Jacuy.

Less than a year after its founding, Railway News reported on June 16, 1883, that the company directors, in their report for the ten months during which they had held office, stated that, owing to the publication of an unfounded telegram arguing that a revolution had broken out in Uruguay, only £88,115 out of the £340,000 debentures for which they asked subscriptions were placed. The directors resolved to clear off, as far as possible, the liabilities which they had taken over from the North Western Railway of Monte Video Company, to put the existing line in good working order, and to proceed with the extension as far as Isla Cabellos (a station from which a large increase of traffic was expected), and, having thus given proofs to the Uruguayan Government that the company intended faithfully to carry out their agreement with them, to ask them to grant an extension of time for completing the railway to Santa Rosa. An application was made to the Government to give the company an eighteen months extension. Regarding the works upon the existing line, the railway superintendent reported that they are in good shape, and that an entirely new station, with the necessary goods and sheds was built at the Port of Salto, to take the place of the old terminus, which was inconveniently situated about 2 km (1 mi) inland.

In 1936, the company owned 16 steam locomotives, nine coaches and 268 goods wagons.
