= Entre Ríos Railway =

British-owned rail company in Argentina (1892–1915)

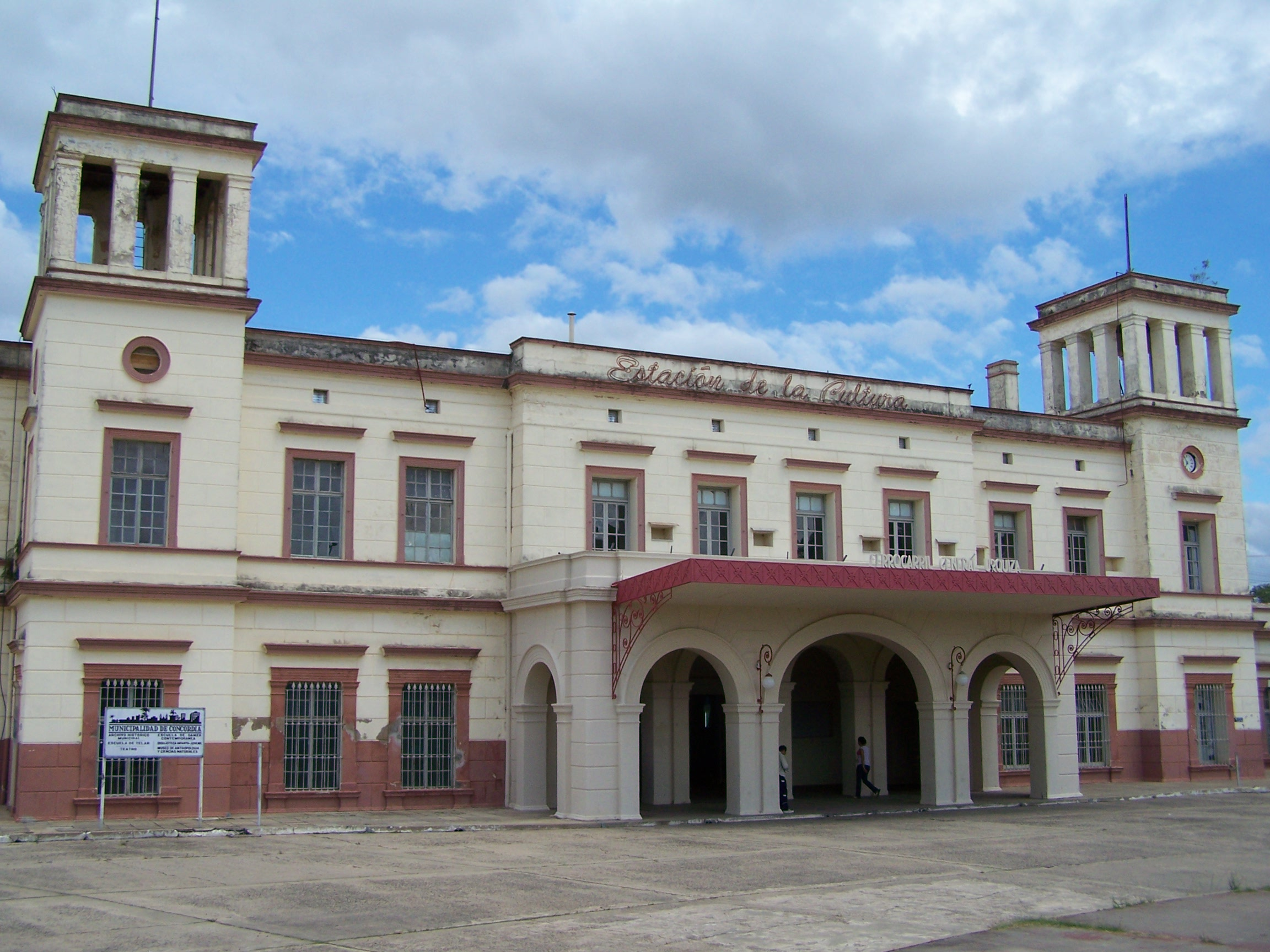
- Concordia station.

Overview
- Native name: Ferrocarril Entre Ríos
- Status: Defunct company; rail line active
- Locale: Entre Ríos
- Termini: Ibicuy; Concordia

Service
- Type: Inter-city

History
- Opened: 1892
- Closed: 1915; 110 years ago (acquired by Argentine North Eastern Railway)

Technical
- Line length: 1,300 km (810 mi)
- Track gauge: 1,435 mm (4 ft 8 1/2 in) standard gauge
Route map
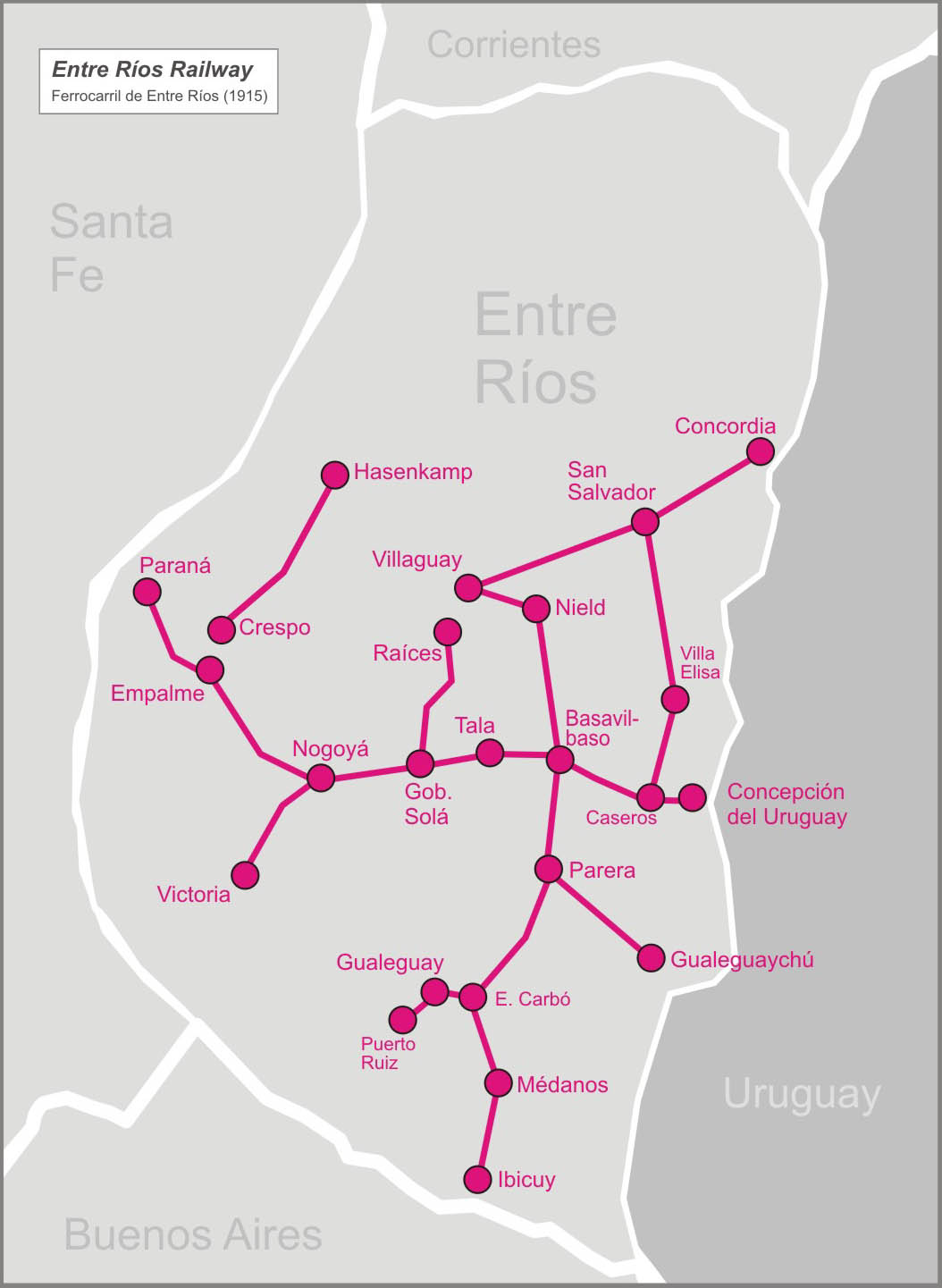

The Entre Ríos Railway (ERR) (in Spanish: Ferrocarril Entre Ríos) was a British-owned railway company that built and operated a 1,435 mm (4 ft 8 1/2 in) standard gauge railway network in Entre Ríos Province, between the rivers Uruguay and Paraná, in Argentina.

== History ==
The company began operation in 1892 by purchasing a 612 km (380 mi) rail network operated by state-owned Central Entre Ríos from the provincial government. Four years later the company purchased the 10 km (6.2 mi) Gualeguay to Puerto Ruiz line, built by "Ferrocarril Primer Entrerriano" in 1866, from the national government, and on 12 October 1899 a 19 km (11.8 mi) branch line from Gobernador Solá to Macía was opened.

A line from Villaguay to Concordia, on the River Uruguay, was built in 1902 reaching Jubileo on 25 January, General Campos on 3 March and Concordia on 30 June where it joined the Argentine North Eastern Railway. Later the following branch lines were opened: from Las Colas to Enrique Carbó on 10 October 1906, from Caseros to Villa Elisa on 28 December 1906, from Crespo to Hasenkamp on 26 August 1907, from Médanos to Carbó on 1 February 1908, from Médanos to Ibicuy on 15 March 1908, from Ibucuy to the port in 1909, Carbó to Parera on 1 December 1909 and Villa Elisa to San Salvador on 2 July 1912.

In 1915 a joint administration was established with the neighbouring British-owned Argentine North Eastern Railway.

By the time President Juan Perón nationalised Argentina's railways in 1948 the ERR operated a 1,300 km network which became part of the state-owned General Urquiza Railway.

== Heritage railway ==
In the early 1990s, a heritage railway was opened and operated by "Ferroclub Central Entrerriano", a local non-profit association formed by railway enthusiasts. Since then, the service has been running trains pulled by steam locomotives between the cities of Villa Elisa and Caseros in Entre Ríos Province, covering a distance of 36 km (22 mi), with a total journey time of 120 minutes.

== See also ==
- General Urquiza Railway
- Argentine North Eastern Railway

== Bibliography ==
- British Railways in Argentina 1857-1914: A Case Study of Foreign Investment by Colin M. Lewis - Athlone Press (for the Institute of Latin American Studies, University of London, 1983)
- British-Owned Railways in Argentina – Their Effect on Economic Nationalism, 1854-1948 by Winthrop R. Wright ( Latin American Monograph No. 34, Institute of Latin American Studies), Univ. of Texas Press (London, 1974)
