= Caseros =

Caseros might refer to:

- Caseros, Buenos Aires, Argentina
- Caseros (Entre Ríos), Argentina
- Caseros Department, a provincial political subdivision in Santa Fe Province, Argentina
- Caseros Prison, Argentina
- Battle of Caseros, Argentina
- Caseros (Buenos Aires Metro)

== See also ==
- Casero
