= Railway stations in Uruguay =

Railway stations in Uruguay include:

== Stations ==
=== Existing ===
- (Uruguay) Montevideo – national capital and port
- Lorenzo Carnelli
- Canelones
- Rodriguez
- Mal Abrigo – junction
- Colonia del Sacramento

- Mal Abrigo
- Fray Bentos – railhead near Argentina border.

=== Proposed ===
- 2010 Proposed bridge connecting with Argentina, and then to Chile via a new base tunnel.
  - (Uruguay) Department of Colonia
  - (Argentina) Province of Entre Ríos

== See also ==
- Rail transport in Uruguay
- Transport in Uruguay
