= 2-6-0+0-6-2 =

Garratt locomotive wheel arrangement

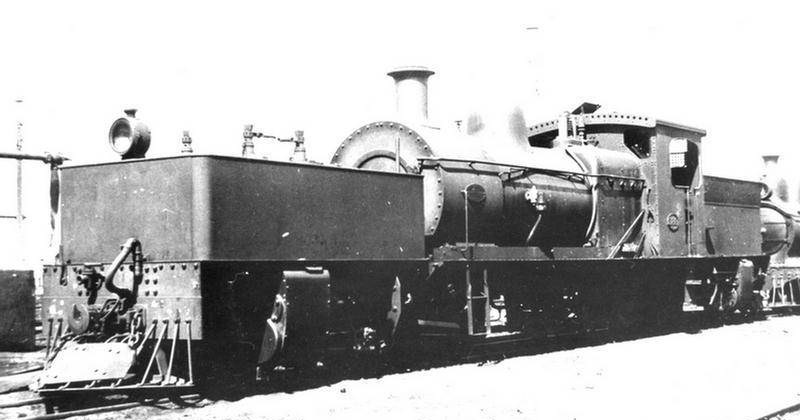
- WAGR M class no. M388, the first 2-6-0+0-6-2 locomotive
Equivalent classifications
- UIC class: 1C+C1, 1'C+C1'
- French class: 130+031
- Turkish class: 34+34
- Swiss class: 3/4+3/4, 6/8 from 1920s
- Russian class: 1-3-0+0-3-1
First known tank engine version
- First use: 1911
- Country: Australia
- Locomotive: WAGR M class
- Railway: Western Australian Government Railways
- Designer: Beyer, Peacock & Company
- Builder: Beyer, Peacock & Company
- Evolved from: 0-4-0+0-4-0

Under the Whyte notation for the classification of steam locomotives, 2-6-0+0-6-2 represents the wheel arrangement of an articulated locomotive with two separate swivelling engine units, arranged back to back with the boiler and cab suspended between them. Each engine unit has two leading wheels in a leading truck, six powered and coupled driving wheels on three axles and no trailing wheels.

The arrangement is effectively two 2-6-0 locomotives operating back-to-back and was used on Garratt, Kitson-Meyer, and Golwé articulated locomotives.

A similar wheel arrangement exists for Mallet steam locomotives on which only the front engine unit swivels, but these are referred to as 2-6-6-2.

== Overview ==
The 2-6-0+0-6-2 was the second Garratt type to appear after the original 0-4-0+0-4-0 and was first used on the fourth through ninth Garratts to be constructed.

2-6-0+0-6-2 Garratt production list – All manufacturers
| Gauge | Railway | Class | Works no. | Units | Year | Builder |
|---|---|---|---|---|---|---|
| 10 1/4 in | Wells & Walsingham Light Railway | | | 1 | 1986 | Neil Simkins |
| 10 1/4 in | Wells & Walsingham Light Railway | | | 1 | 2010 | Wells & Walsingham Light Railway |
| 2 ft | South African Railways | NG G11 | 5975-5977 | 3 | 1919 | Beyer, Peacock & Company |
| 2 ft | South African Railways | NG G11 | 6199-6200 | 2 | 1925 | Beyer, Peacock & Company |
| 2 ft 6 in | Victorian Railways, Australia | G | 6267-6268 | 2 | 1926 | Beyer, Peacock & Company |
| 1,000 mm | São Paulo Railway, Brazil | U | 5664 | 1 | 1912 | Beyer, Peacock & Company |
| 1,000 mm | São Paulo Railway, Brazil | V | 6795 | 1 | 1936 | Beyer, Peacock & Company |
| 1,000 mm | C.F.Madagascar | B | 2031-2032 | 2 | 1926 | St. Leonard, Belgium |
| 3 ft 6 in | South African Railways | GA | 5941 | 1 | 1920 | Beyer, Peacock & Company |
| 3 ft 6 in | Australian Portland Cement | | 6794 | 1 | 1936 | Beyer, Peacock & Company |
| 3 ft 6 in | Australian Portland Cement | | 6935 | 1 | 1939 | Beyer, Peacock & Company |
| 3 ft 6 in | Western Australian Government Railways | M | 5477-5482 | 6 | 1911 | Beyer, Peacock & Company |
| 3 ft 6 in | Western Australian Government Railways | Ms | 5665-5671 | 7 | 1912 | Beyer, Peacock & Company |
| 3 ft 6 in | Western Australian Government Railways | Msa | 46-55 | 10 | 1930 | Western Australian Government Railways |
| 4 ft 8 1/2 in | Argentine North Eastern Railway | | 6238-6240 | 3 | 1925 | Beyer, Peacock & Company |
| 4 ft 8 1/2 in | London Midland & Scottish Railway | Garratt | 6325-6327 | 3 | 1927 | Beyer, Peacock & Company |
| 4 ft 8 1/2 in | Argentine North Eastern Railway | | 6349-6352 | 4 | 1927 | Beyer, Peacock & Company |
| 4 ft 8 1/2 in | East African Railways | | 6355-6359 | 5 | 1927 | Beyer, Peacock & Company |
| 4 ft 8 1/2 in | London Midland & Scottish Railway | Garratt | 6648-6677 | 30 | 1930 | Beyer, Peacock & Company |

== Usage ==
=== Australia ===
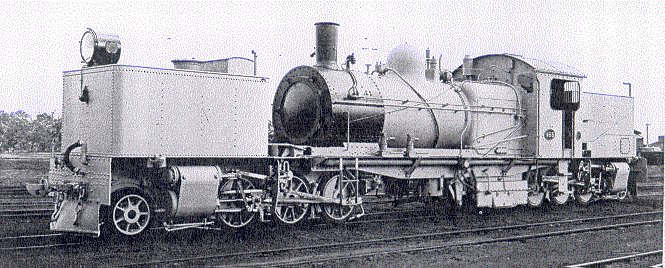
Western Australian Government Railways MSA class Garratt locomotive no MSA468, c. 1930

A group of six locomotives of 3 ft 6 in (1,067 mm) gauge were constructed for the Western Australian Government Railways in 1911 as their Class M. Further locomotives for this railway included seven more Class Ms locomotives in 1912.

The Australian Portland Cement Company took delivery of two 3 ft 6 in (1,067 mm) gauge locomotives in 1936 and 1939, as their no. 1 and no. 2 engines for the Fyansford Cement Works Railway. These engines replaced two Vulcan Iron Works 0-6-0ST on the mainline haul until they were later displaced by Australian Standard Garratt no. G33.

Fyansford's no. 2, by then a combination of no. 2's centre unit and no. 1's engine units, was in service until 1966, when the quarry line was replaced by a conveyor belt. Fyansford no. 2 was to be evaluated in 2015 for return to service on the Bellarine Railway, after having been moved there from the Menzies Creek Museum of the Puffing Billy Railway in 2010.

=== Philippines ===
The Manila Railway Company (now the Philippine National Railways) operated four 160-class Kitson-Meyer locomotives that were built in 1914. It was once disputed as to whether the class was 2-6-0+0-6-2T or 2-6-6-2T. Two sources mentioned that they were 2-6-0+0-6-2T, while one source claims that they were actually 2-6-6-2T. It was later confirmed in the Kitson Steam Locomotive Catalogue (1839-1923) that the locomotives were classified by Kitson as a 2-6-0+0-6-2T.

As most of the Meyer locomotives were found in South America, the Manila Railway was the only known operator of the type in Asia. It was also the only articulated locomotive class operated by the company. These tank locomotives were made to operate on the Antipolo line. However, due to the steep gradient and a high operational cost, the line was closed in 1917. These locomotives were then relegated to the Pagsanjan line in Laguna and the South Main Line between Manila and Lucena. These locomotives were retired in 1925 after being replaced by larger tender locomotives.

=== South Africa ===
==== Narrow gauge ====
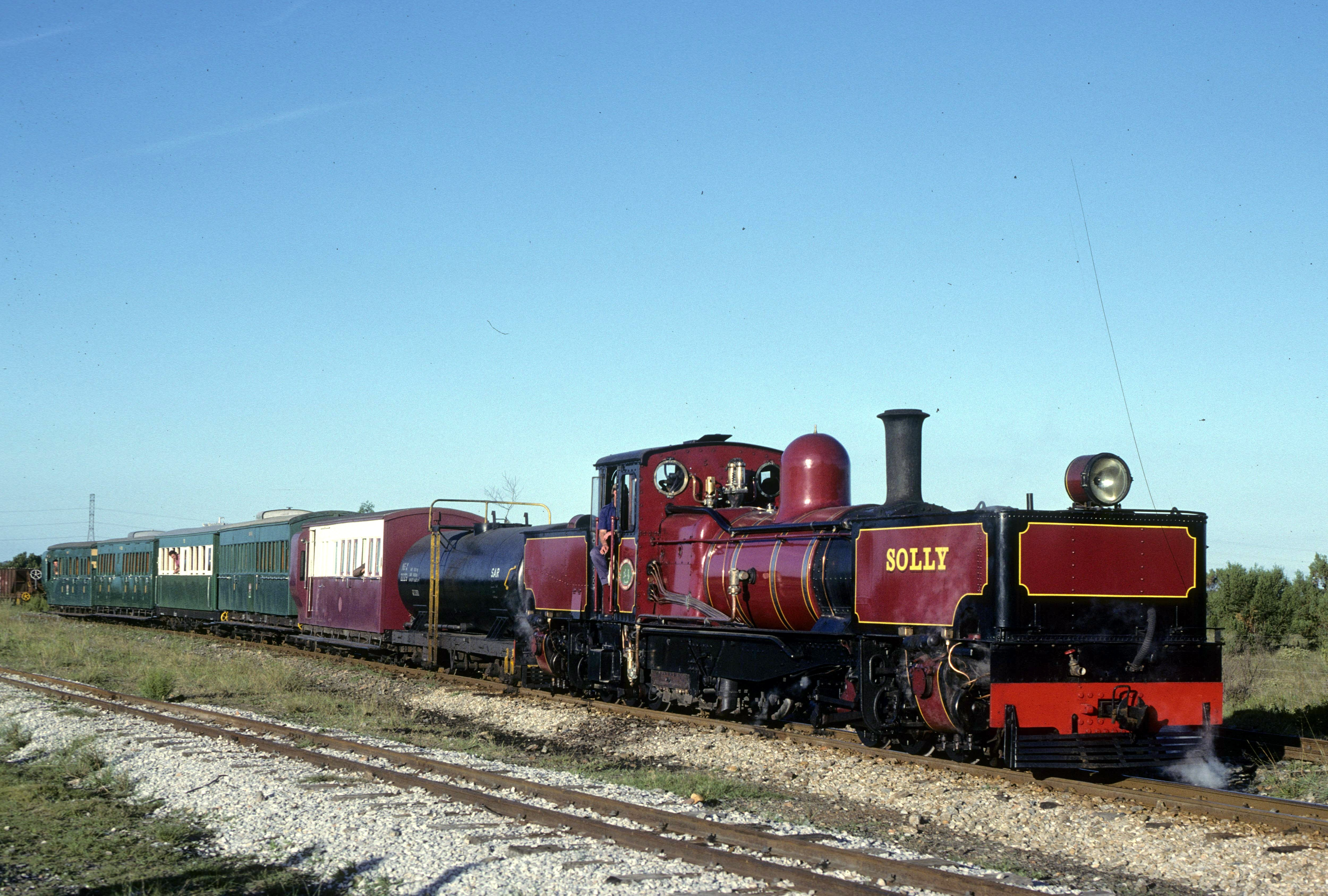
Restored SAR Class NG G11 no. 54 Solly at Chelsea, 3 April 1990

Between 1919 and 1925, the South African Railways (SAR) placed five Class NG G11 Garratt locomotives with this wheel arrangement in service on the Avontuur 2 ft (610 mm) narrow gauge line through the Langkloof and also in Natal. They were the first Garratt locomotives to enter service in South Africa. The three locomotives, numbered 51 to 53, were erected at Uitenhage and put on trials on the Avontuur line in May 1920. These first three locomotives were not superheated. They had outside plate frames, Walschaerts valve gear, Belpaire fireboxes and used saturated steam and slide valves.

Having been proven successful during trials, another two locomotives were ordered from Beyer, Peacock & Company. Numbers 54 and 55 were delivered in 1925 and placed in service in Natal. Since these two were superheated, they had longer smokeboxes and were 9 1/2 inches (241 millimetres) longer in overall length, while the incorporation of piston valves required alteration of the valve gear. The cabs of the second order locomotives were also improved to offer better protection to the crew.

==== Cape gauge ====
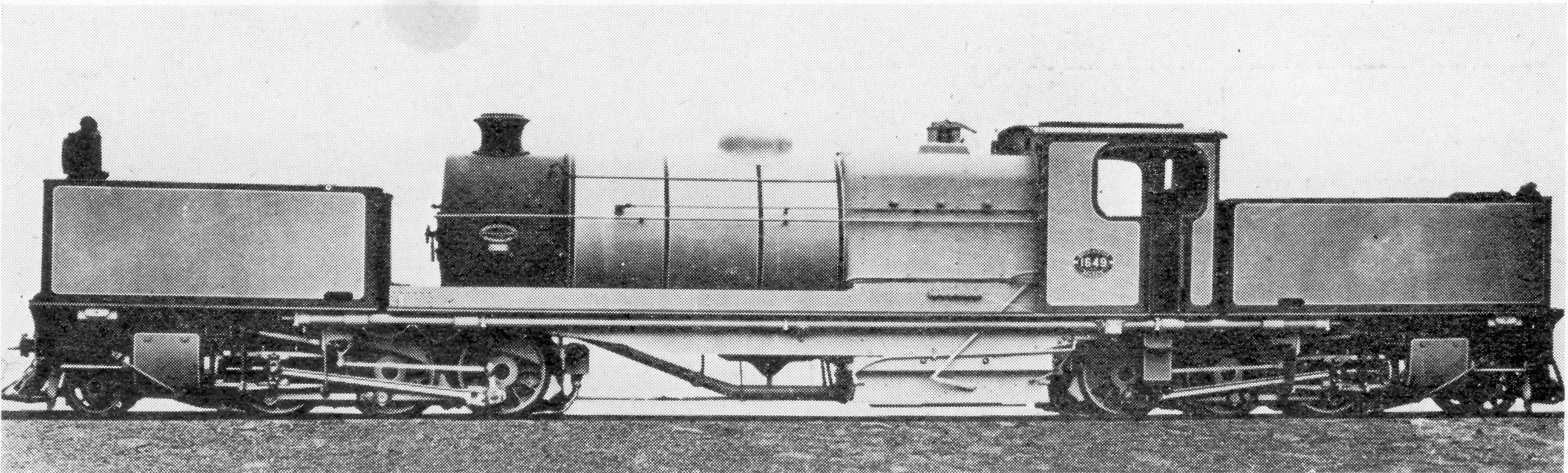
SAR Class GA, circa 1921

In February 1921, the SAR placed a single experimental Class GA Garratt 2-6-0+0-6-2 locomotive in service. It was ordered from Beyer, Peacock & Company in 1914, together with the order for the narrow gauge Class NG G11 Garratts, but wartime hostilities also delayed its delivery until 1920. It was the first Cape gauge Garratt to enter service in South Africa.

The locomotive was superheated, with a Belpaire firebox, a plate frame and Walschaerts valve gear. It was erected in the Durban shops and placed in trial service on the Natal mainline. During the trials it was found that the absence of trailing carrying wheels on the engine units was a disadvantage, since it led to excessive flange wear on the driving wheels. As a result, the locomotive remained the only representative of its Class and all subsequent Garratt models of the SAR were equipped with trailing Bissel trucks on their engine units. The locomotive was withdrawn from service in 1938 because of a cracked frame and scrapped.

=== United Kingdom ===
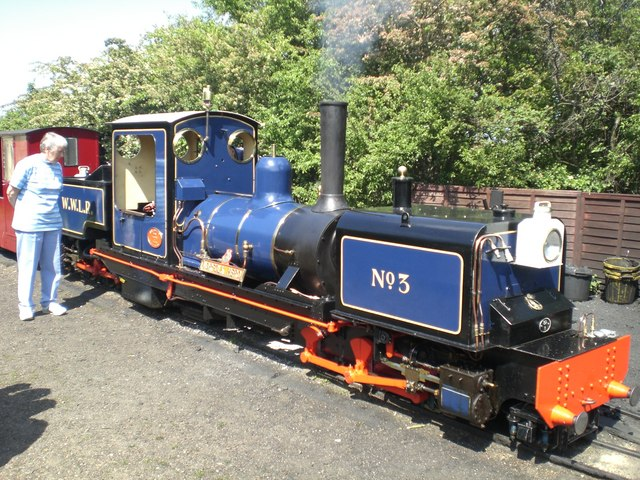
2-6-0+0-6-2 Norfolk Hero

==== Narrow Gauge ====
One 21st century example of this wheel arrangement has been built for the Wells & Walsingham Light Railway, a 10 1/4 in (260 mm) gauge heritage railway in Norfolk, England. An earlier 2-6-0+0-6-2 Garratt, No. 3, the Norfolk Hero, was built by Neil Simkins in 1986. In 2010, the fleet was augmented by a new Garratt, No. 6, the Norfolk Heroine.

==== Standard Gauge ====
The London, Midland and Scottish Railway built 33 Garratt locomotives (3 in 1927, 30 in 1930) to use as heavy freight engines. They were withdrawn from 1955 to 1958.
