= Médanos =

- Médanos, Buenos Aires, Argentina
- Médanos (Entre Ríos), Argentina
- Médanos de Coro National Park, Venezuela
- Médanos (geology) - a type of sand dune
- Médanos (appellation) - a geographic indication applied to wines
- El Médano, Spain
- Los Medanos College, Pittsburg, California
