= La Transatlántica =

Defunct tramway company in Uruguay

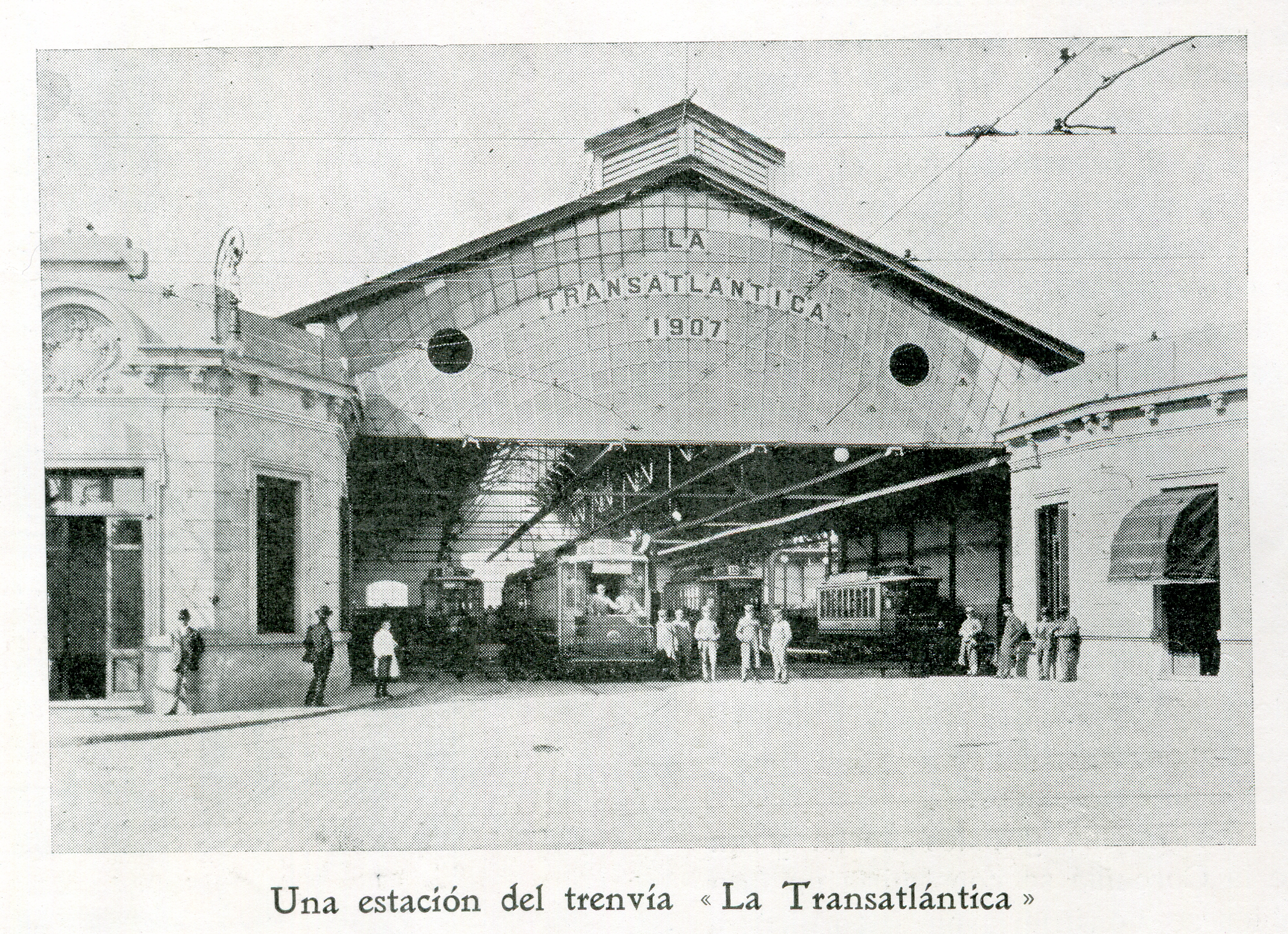
- Native name: La Transatlántica Compañía de Tranvías Eléctricos
- Industry: Public transport
- Predecessor: Tranvía Oriental; Tranvía al Paso Molino y Cerro
- Founded: 1 June 1907
- Defunct: 1933
- Fate: Acquired by Sociedad Comercial de Montevideo in 1928; fully merged in 1933
- Successor: Sociedad Comercial de Montevideo
- Headquarters: Montevideo, Uruguay
- Area served: Montevideo
- Services: Tram services
- Parent: AEG

La Transatlántica Compañía de Tranvías Eléctricos, usually known simply as La Transatlántica, was a tramway company in Montevideo, Uruguay. Founded in 1907 with backing from AEG, it operated electric tram services in the city until its acquisition by Sociedad Comercial de Montevideo in 1928 and its full merger into that company in 1933.

== History ==
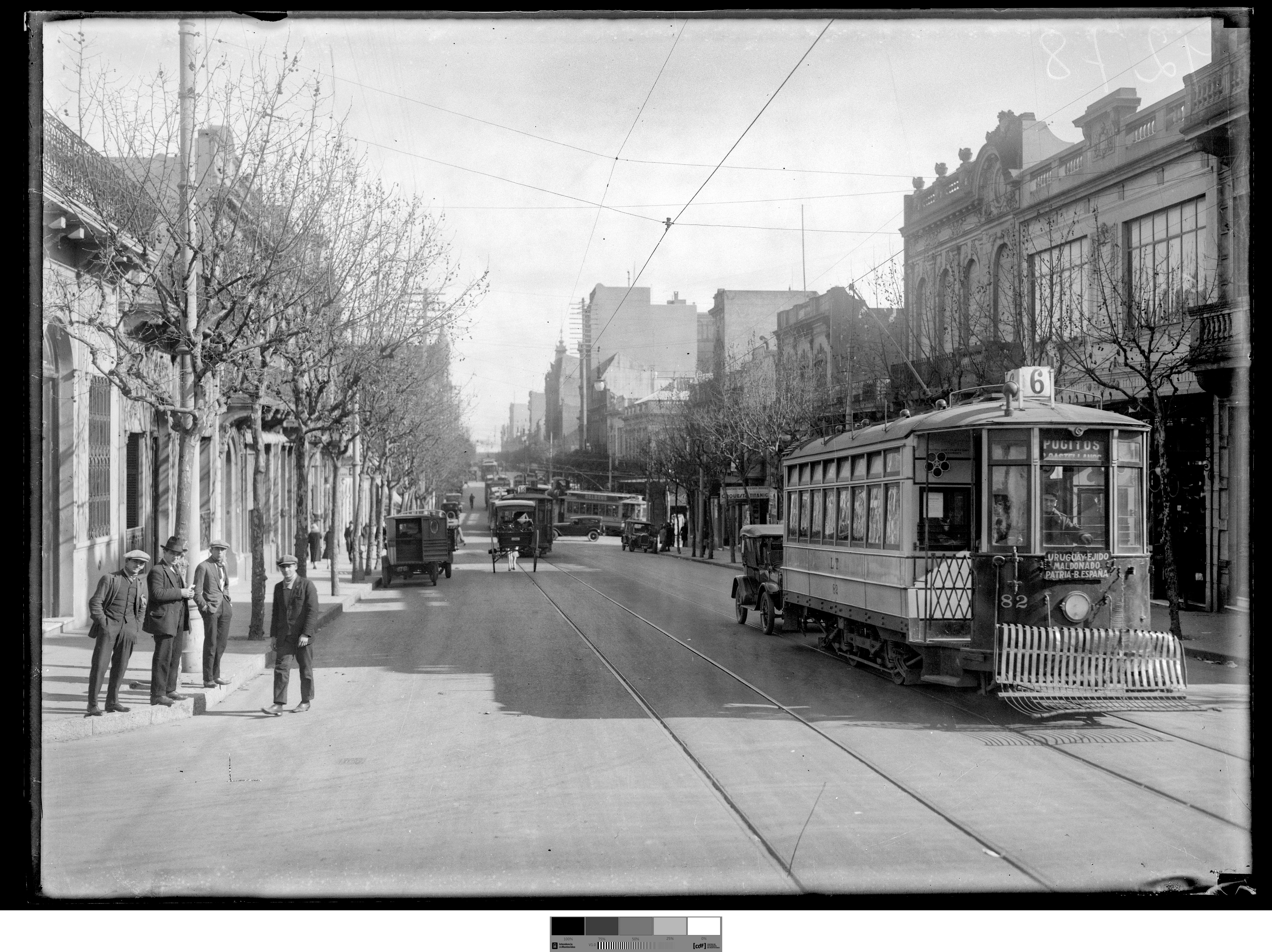
A La Transatlántica tram

On 1 June 1907, the German electrical concern AEG established La Transatlántica by taking over the horse-drawn companies Tranvía Oriental and Tranvía al Paso Molino y Cerro, with the aim of electrifying and unifying those services. The new electric network was inaugurated in early June 1907, and local transport chronologies date the opening of Line 1, between the Aduana and Paso Molino, to 3 June 1907.

As the system expanded, the company introduced large-capacity tramcars of European, especially German, design. In Montevideo they became especially associated with the company's yellow-and-brown livery.

La Transatlántica became one of the major operators in Montevideo's electric tramway system and was particularly identified with service to outlying districts in the west and northwest of the city. To encourage leisure travel and increase ridership, in 1910 the company developed Parque Capurro on land it owned, promoting the area as a bathing resort and recreational destination.

In 1926, under an agreement with the Uruguayan state, the company inaugurated a new electric tram service to Santiago Vázquez, designated Line E. It was the only tram route in Montevideo identified by a letter rather than a number.

In 1928 Sociedad Comercial de Montevideo acquired La Transatlántica, including Agraciada station, and the full merger was completed in 1933.

== Infrastructure ==
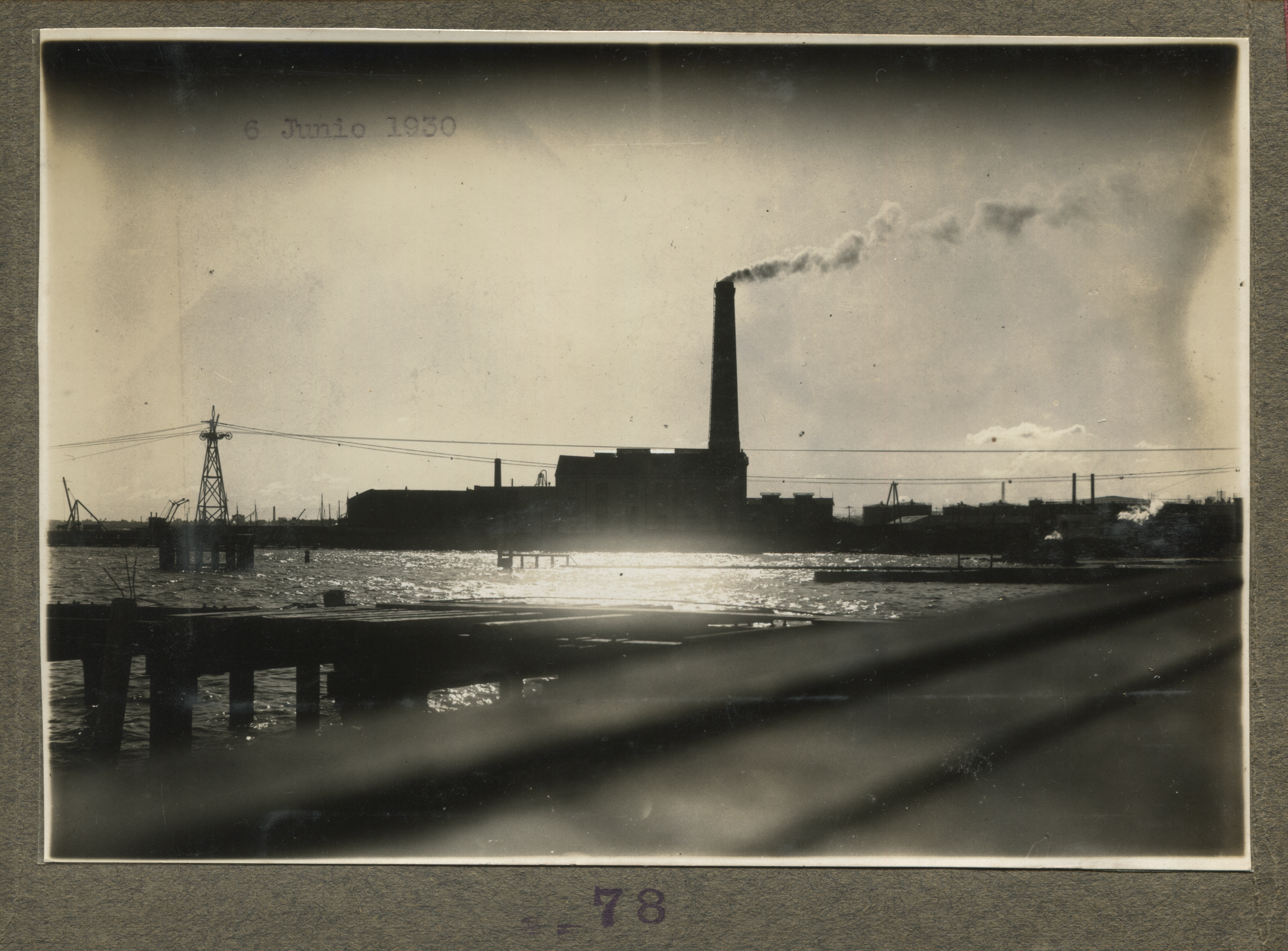
The company's power station in Arroyo Seco

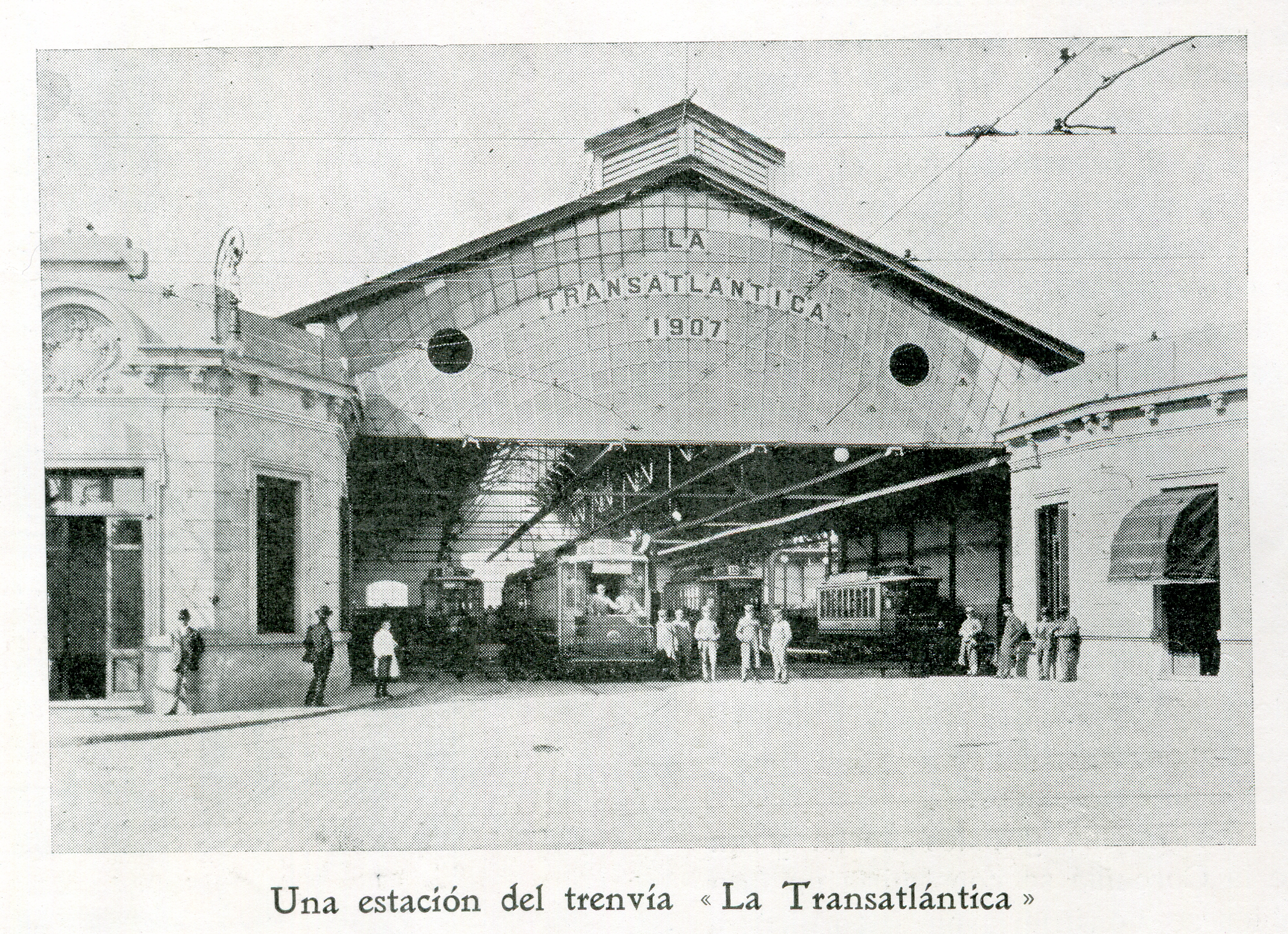
Agraciada station on Avenida Agraciada, in Arroyo Seco

La Transatlántica generated the electricity needed for its tram operations in its own power station in the Arroyo Seco district. The installation stood on the shore of Montevideo Bay, at the mouth of the Arroyo Seco, a position considered advantageous both for power generation and for transport logistics.

The company also maintained a group of stations and depots at different points in the city, noted for their architecture and engineering. Among the best known were Goes station in Goes, Agraciada station in Arroyo Seco, Artigas station in Parque Rodó, and Larrobla station in Capurro. Besides their operational and maintenance functions, these facilities became important landmarks in Montevideo's tramway infrastructure.

== Lines ==
The following routes are attributed to the company in local transport chronologies:

Line	Route
E	Palacio de Gobierno – Santiago Vázquez
1	Aduana – Paso Molino
3	Aduana – Villa Muñoz
7	Palacio de Gobierno – Playa Ramírez
8	Aduana – Malvín
9	Pérez Castellano – Playa Ramírez
10	Aduana – Cordón
13	Aduana – Hipódromo de Maroñas
14	Larrañaga – Playa Ramírez
15	Pocitos – Paso Molino
16	Aduana – Cerro
17	Aduana – Piedras Blancas
18	Garibaldi – Playa Ramírez
19	Goes station – Playa Ramírez
20	Palacio de Gobierno – Atahualpa
21	Ciudadela – Capurro

== See also ==
- Rail transport in Uruguay
