= LMS Garratt =

British steam locomotive class (1927–1958)

LMS Beyer-Garratt
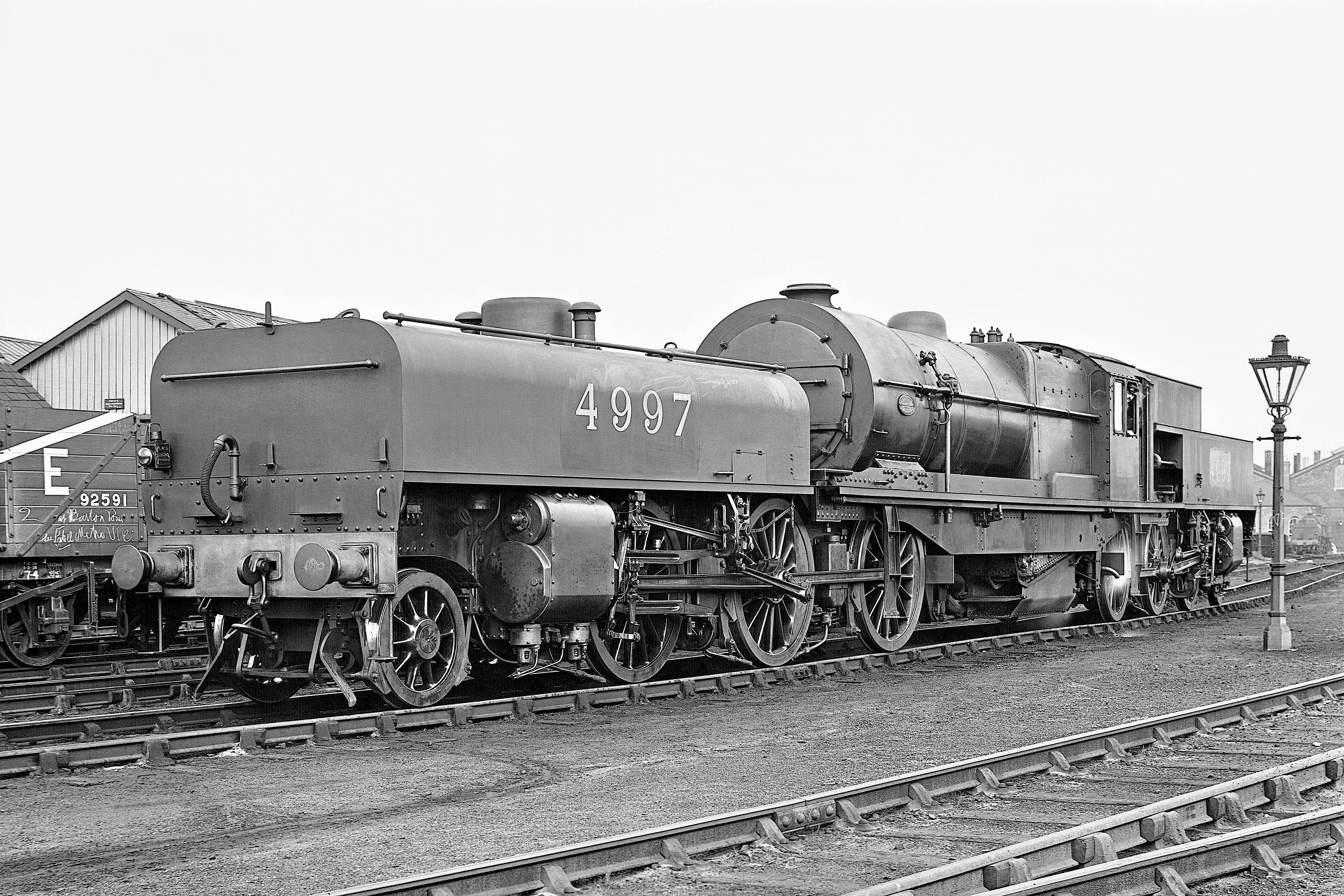
- 4997 in 1930
Type and origin
- Power type: Steam
- Builder: Beyer, Peacock & Co.
- Serial number: 6325–6327, 6648–6677
- Build date: 1927 (3), 1930 (30)
- Total produced: 33
Specifications
- Configuration
  - Whyte: 2-6-0+0-6-2T
  - UIC: (1′C)(C1′) h4t
- Gauge: 4 ft 8 1/2 in (1,435 mm) standard gauge
- Leading dia.: 3 ft 3 1/2 in (1.003 m)
- Driver dia.: 5 ft 3 in (1.600 m)
- Wheelbase: 79 ft (24.08 m)
- Length: 87 ft 10 1/2 in (26.78 m)
- Loco weight: 1927 built: 148.75 long tons (151.1 t; 166.6 short tons); 1930 built: 152.5 long tons (154.9 t; 170.8 short tons)
- Fuel type: Coal
- Fuel capacity: 1927 built: 7 long tons (7.1 t; 7.8 short tons); 1930 built: 9 long tons (9.1 t; 10 short tons)
- Water cap.: 4,500 imp gal (20,000 L; 5,400 US gal)
- Firebox
  - Grate area: 44.5 sq ft (4.13 m^{2})
- Boiler: LMS type Garratt
- Boiler pressure: 190 lbf/in^{2} (1.31 MPa)
- Heating surface
  - Firebox: 183 sq ft (17.0 m^{2})
  - Tubes and flues: 1,954 sq ft (181.5 m^{2})
- Superheater
  - Heating area: 500 sq ft (46 m^{2}) or 466 sq ft (43.3 m^{2})
- Cylinders: Four, outside
- Cylinder size: 18 1/2 in × 26 in (470 mm × 660 mm)
- Valve gear: Walschaerts
- Valve type: Piston valves
Performance figures
- Tractive effort: 45,620 lbf (202.9 kN)
Career
- Operators: London, Midland and Scottish Railway; → British Railways
- Class: Garratt
- Power class: Not classified
- Withdrawn: 1955–1958
- Disposition: All scrapped

The London, Midland and Scottish Railway (LMS) Garratt was a class of Garratt 2-6-0+0-6-2 steam locomotive designed for heavy freight. A total of 33 were built from 1927, making them the most numerous class of Garratt in Britain.

== Overview ==
After Grouping, the LMS initially continued the Midland Railway's "small engine policy" of hauling trains using two or three locomotives of moderate power coupled together. This led to most of the Toton (Nottinghamshire)-Brent (London) coal trains being double-headed by 0-6-0 locomotives. It was realised that double heading was uneconomical so a Garratt locomotive, designed by Fowler, was ordered from Beyer, Peacock and Company to haul 1,450 long tons (1,470 t; 1,620 short tons) at 25 mph (40 km/h). However, the LMS Derby design office insisted on, amongst other changes, the fitting of their standard axleboxes to the design. These axleboxes were barely adequate for the LMS Fowler Class 4F locomotives, on which they frequently overheated, and as the Garratts were much larger, they were a major weakness on the LMS Garratts. They were also always heavy on coal and maintenance. Tester's work shows that this may have been due to poor selection of oil and whitemetal rather than intrinsic design issues. Sixsmith reports that the boiler was a design for a Somerset and Dorset 2-8-0, further reducing coal efficiency, and that the steam injectors were also much shorter than recommended.

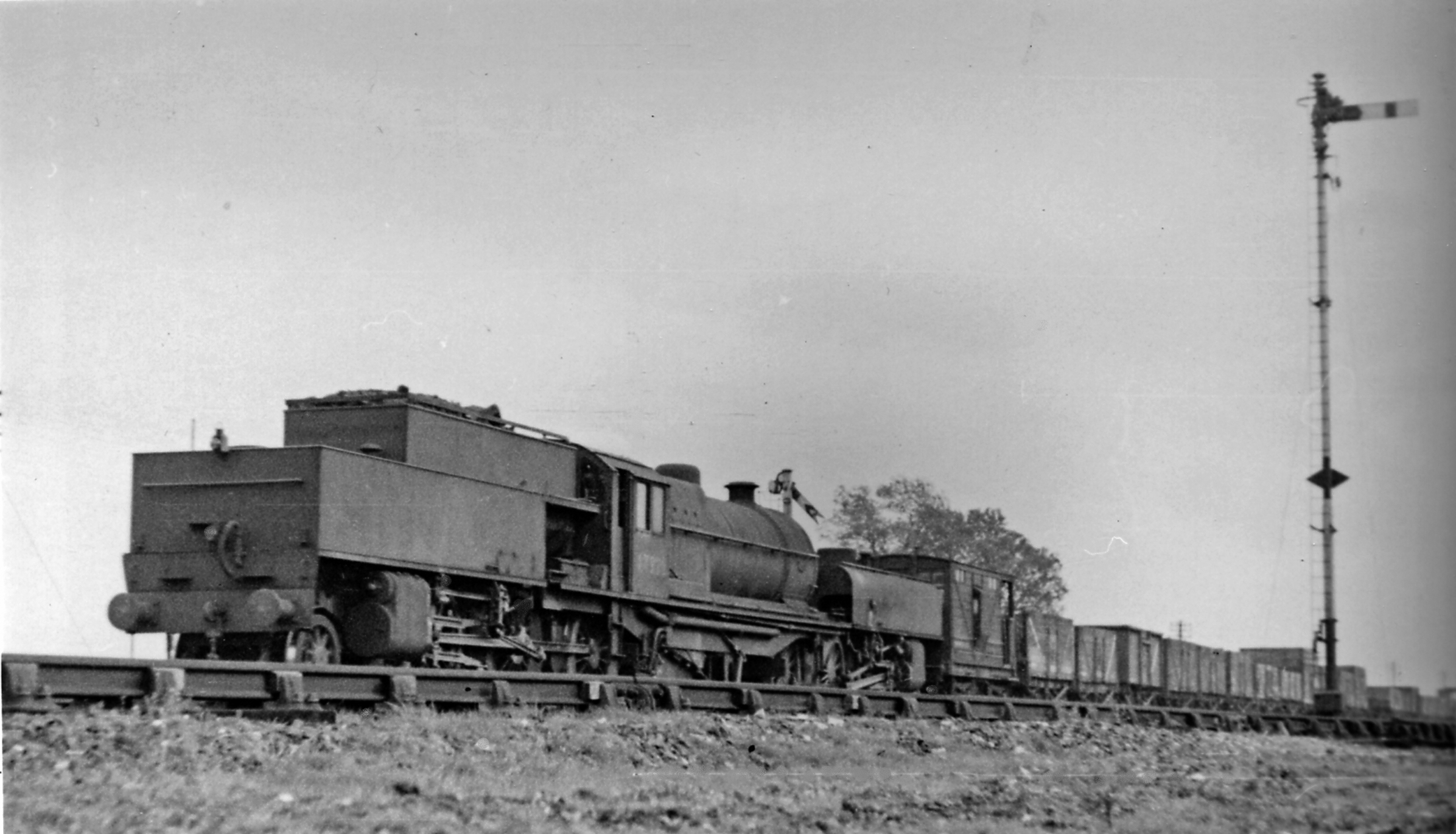
No. 47999, with straight-sided bunker, approaching Loughborough, 6 October 1950

Three locomotives were built in April 1927 and were fitted with vacuum braking attachments, and the remaining 30 were built in the period August to November 1930. All were built with straight sided bunkers but from 1931 all except the first two of the 1927 trio were fitted with revolving coal bunkers. These were conical in shape and were revolved and oscillated by means of a small 2-cylinder steam engine. The revolving bunkers reduced coal dust from entering the cab and the oscillation facility made them self-trimming, but Sixsmith reports they were still unpopular to drive bunker-first due to dust, and that covers were unsuccessful.

The 1927 trio were numbered 4997–4999, and the 1930 batch from 4967 to 4996. They were later renumbered 7967–7999 in the same order to make way for the new Black 5’s. British Railways added 40000 to their numbers.

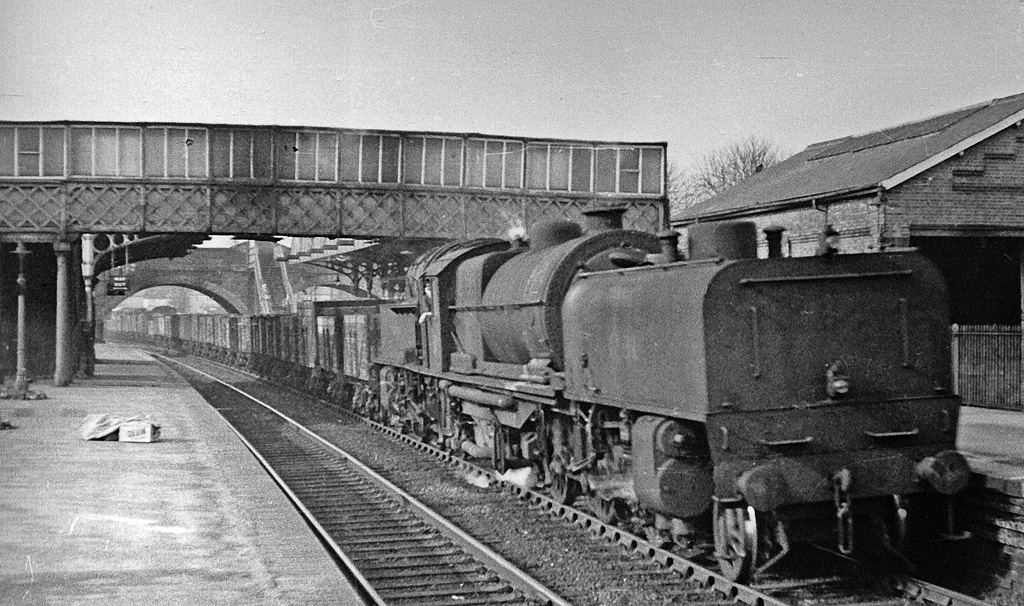
LMS 2-6-0+0-6-2 Garratt brings a long coal train up from Toton Yard to Brent Sidings (Cricklewood)

The roundhouses at Toton MPD had to have extra length Garratt roads to accommodate them. Mostly used for heavy coal trains, they later found other uses as well, and Sixsmith includes photographs of them at York, Gloucester, and Birmingham. Others were allocated to Wellingborough (depot code 45A where 15 locomotives were located in the 1950s) and Hasland near Chesterfield. Trains for Manchester were generally routed along the Hope Valley Line and the Garratts normally came off their trains at the Gowhole freight sidings just west of Chinley. A few would work the Ambergate to Pye Bridge Line using the north curve at Ambergate, but only as far as Rowsley, where the train would be split. This was normal for goods trains because of the danger of couplings breaking on the climb to Peak Forest. In addition, although they had ample tractive effort to climb the gradient, in the days before goods wagon trains had continuous brakes there were problems on the way down into Chinley. On an early attempt, the loco was inspected at Heaton Mersey and it was found that all of its brake blocks had melted.

The single photograph recording a rake of 20 passenger coaches pulled by an LMS Garratt (No. 4999 - photo from the Frank Carrier archive) came from an unsuccessful trial of a Derby-St. Pancras run that had to be terminated at Leicester due to a hot axlebox. There is no evidence that they were used on the very similar Notts-Stonebridge Park coal run that used LMS's new-in-1929 40 long tons (41 t; 45 short tons) braked coal waggons (58 long tons (59 t; 65 short tons) gross).

The summary of Sixsmith's review of them is that they were very successful in the 1927/8 trial, and the class then lasted 25 years, averaging 25,000 mi (40,000 km) per year. However, the design did not age well, especially under wartime lack of maintenance, causing generally poor later opinions. This implies they were too good to scrap, but not good enough to replicate. They were replaced by BR Standard Class 9F locomotives, which were designed to haul 900 long tons (910 t; 1,000 short tons) at 35 mph (56 km/h).

== Withdrawal ==
The class was withdrawn between June 1955 and April 1958. None survived into preservation.

Table of withdrawals
Year	Quantity in service at start of year	Quantity withdrawn	Locomotive numbers
1955	33	7	47970/75/85/89–91/93.
1956	26	13	47971/74/76–77/81/83–84/88/92/96–99.
1957	13	12	47967–69/72–73/78–80/82/86–87/95.
1958	1	1	47994.

== Models ==
The Rosebud Kitmaster company produced an unpowered polystyrene injection moulded 00 scale model, which went on sale in March 1961. In late 1962, the Kitmaster brand was sold by its parent company (Rosebud Dolls) to Airfix, who transferred the moulding tools to their own factory; they re-introduced some of the former Kitmaster range, but the Garratt model was not among them. The moulding tools for this locomotive were scrapped in 1982. Heljan was commissioned by Hattons of Liverpool to produce a model in OO gauge which became the manufacturer's first UK outline OO gauge steam locomotive model.

== See also ==
- LNER Class U1, a contemporary Garratt built by the London and North Eastern Railway
