= East Argentine Railway =

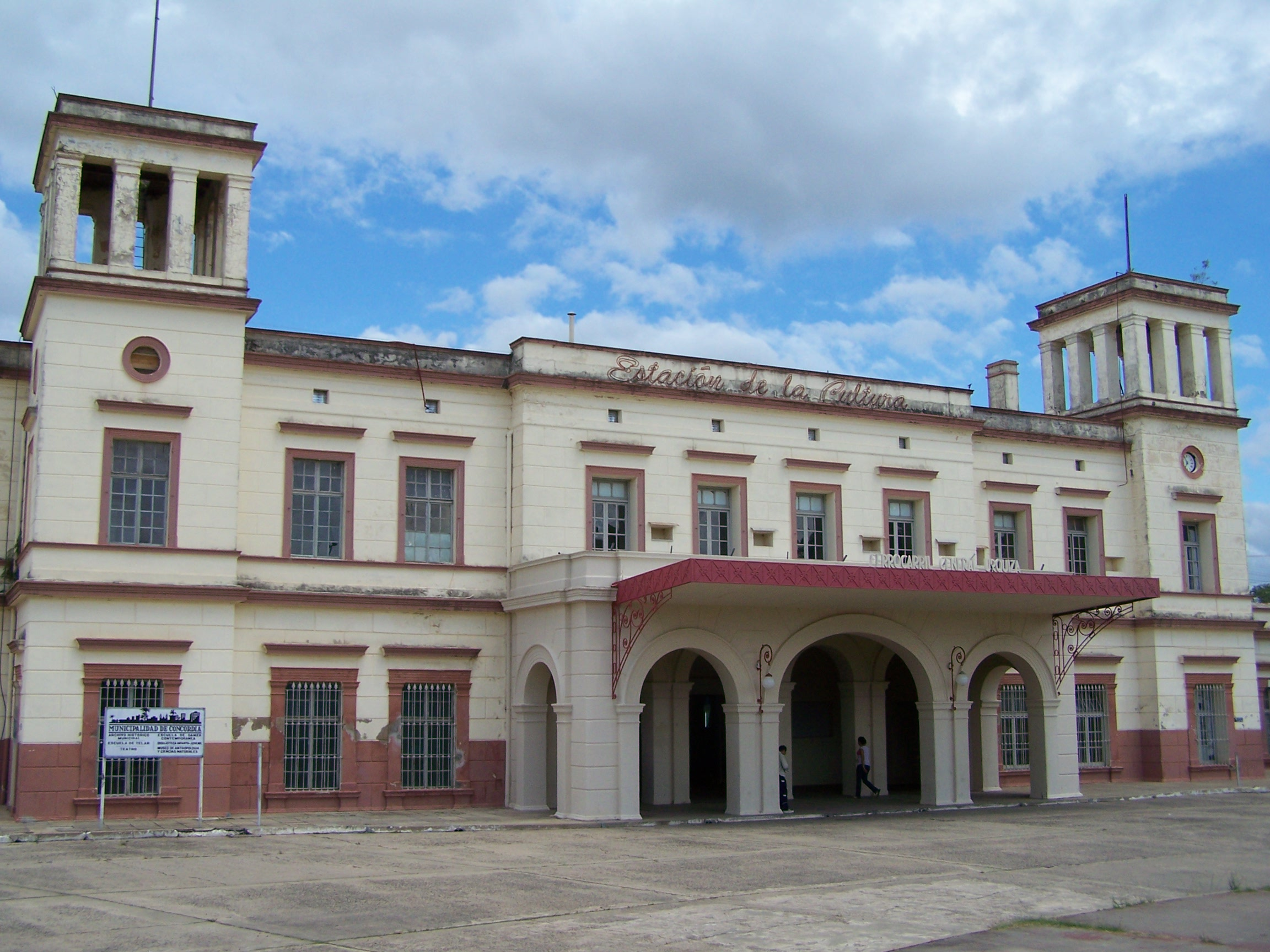
- Concordia station, terminus.

Overview
- Native name: Ferrocarril Este Argentino
- Status: Defunct company; rail line active
- Locale: Entre Ríos, Corrientes
- Termini: Concordia; Monte Caseros

History
- Opened: 1874
- Closed: 1907; 119 years ago (acquired by Argentine North Eastern Railway)

Technical
- Track gauge: 1,435 mm (4 ft 8 1/2 in) standard gauge
Route map
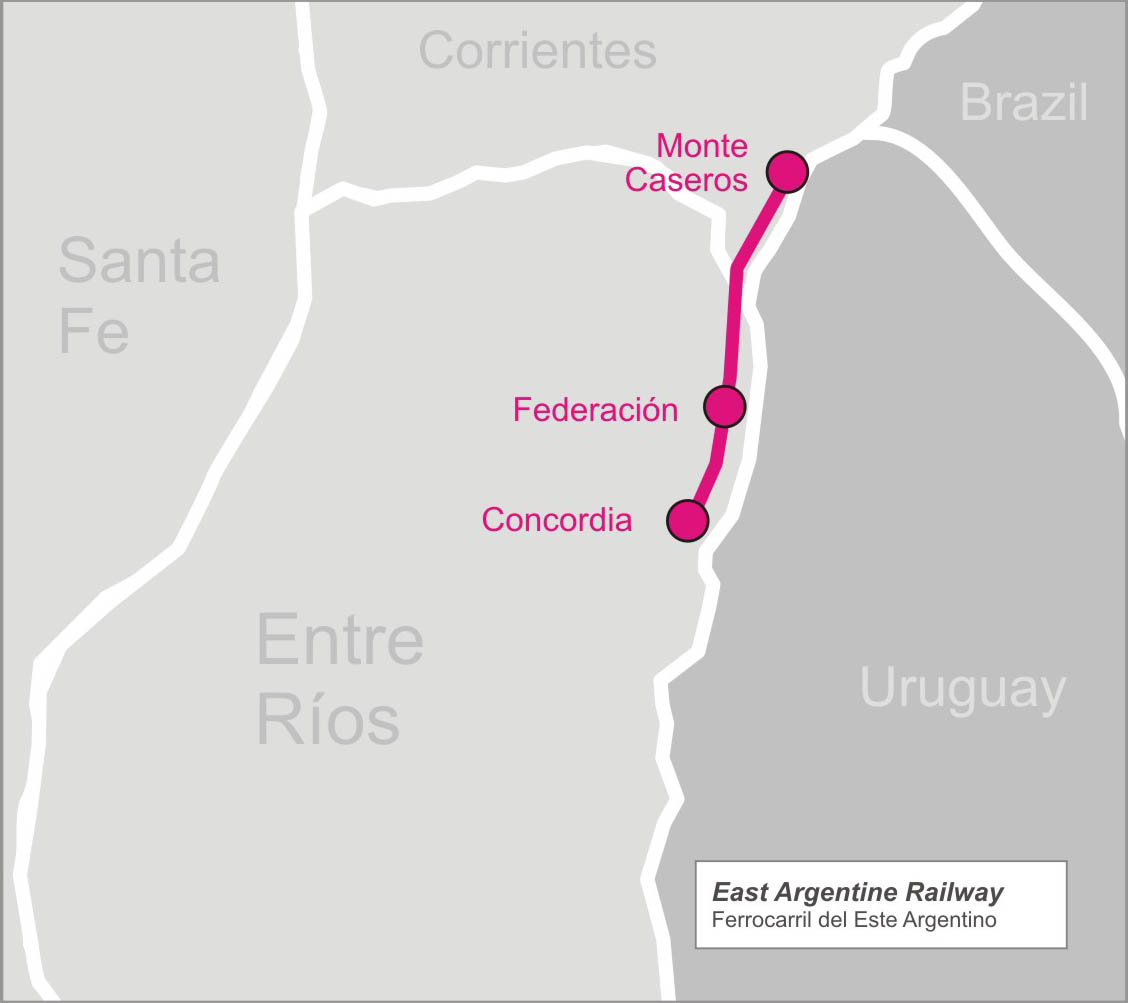

The East Argentine Railway (EA) (in Spanish: Ferrocarril Este Argentino) was a British-owned railway company, founded in 1871, that operated a 1,435 mm (4 ft 8 1/2 in) standard gauge railway network in the Entre Ríos and Corrientes provinces of Argentina. Financial problems forced the sale of the company to another British-owned company, the Argentine North Eastern Railway (ANER) in 1907.

== History ==
The company was founded in August 1871 to take over a concession, originally granted to P.Montravel in October 1864 for the construction of a line, 293 km long, from Concordia in the province of Entre Ríos to Mercedes in the province of Corrientes. Standard gauge was chosen because of its use in the neighboring country of Uruguay and other railways in that part of Argentina later followed this example.

Starting from Concordia, Federación was reached in 1874, Monte Caseros the next year and then Ceibo on the River Uruguay, which was later developed as a port. Financial problems ensued and further construction of the line was stopped.

In 1886 the Argentine government granted a new concession to John and Matthew Clark to complete the line from Monte Caseros to Mercedes and on to Corrientes. The Clark brothers later transferred their concession to the ANE for the construction to be completed and in 1907 the company bought the EAR.

== See also ==
- Argentine North Eastern Railway
- Urquiza Railway

== Bibliography ==
- British Railways in Argentina 1857-1914: A Case Study of Foreign Investment by Colin M. Lewis - Athlone Press (for the Institute of Latin American Studies, University of London, 1983)
- British Railways in Argentina 1860-1948 by H.R. Stones - P.E.Waters & Associates, Bromley, Kent (England, 1993)
