= Casero =

Casero is a surname. Notable people with the surname include:

- Alfredo Casero (born 1962), Argentine musician, actor and comedian
- Ángel Casero (born 1972), Spanish road bicycle racer
- Belén Fernández Casero (born 1974), Spanish politician
- Nazareno Casero (born 1986), Argentine film and television actor
- Rafael Casero (born 1976), Spanish professional road bicycle racer
- Sigfredo Casero-Ortiz (born 1997), Cuban-born naturalized Belgian professional basketball player

== See also ==
- Caseros (disambiguation)
