= Brent sidings =

Former railway facility in London

Coordinates: 51.56489°N 0.21915°W

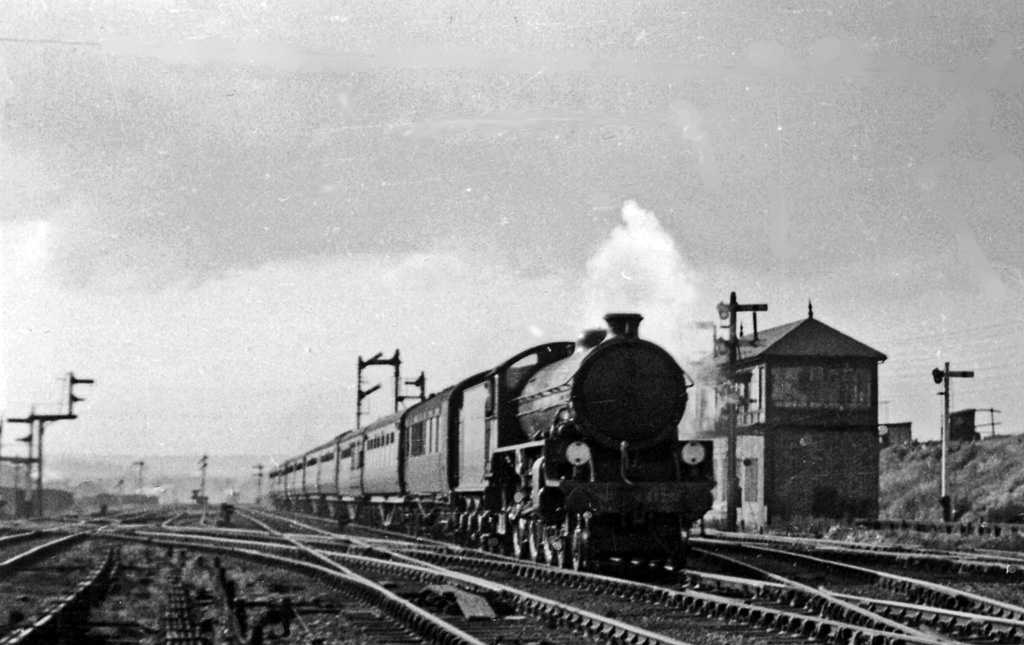
A train passing Brent Sidings and Cricklewood Junction Box on the Manchester Central to St Pancras express route, in 1948

Brent sidings was a marshalling yard and freight facility on the Midland Railway extension to London.

== History ==
The sidings were situated on both sides of the Midland Main Line between Cricklewood and Welsh Harp stations, close to the triangle formed where the Dudding Hill Line left the main line. When the line from the midlands was quadrupled, the two eastern tracks were used by goods trains; to enable these to reach Brent sidings, a flyover was provided at Silkstream Junction, north of Hendon.

== Coal traffic ==
Coal trains, each consisting of up to 85 wagons, were despatched from the marshalling yards at Toton (between Nottingham and Derby), and received at Brent sidings. Here, they were split up and forwarded to the Midland Railway's own coal depots around London, and also to the London area marshalling yards belonging to other railways.

== Locomotives ==
The coal trains from Toton were so heavy that two 0-6-0 locomotives were usually required; from 1927, special LMS Garratt locomotives were built for this traffic, one of which could handle a similar load as two of the normal locomotives.
