= Rail transport in Uruguay =

Uruguay

Operation
- National railway: AFE

System length
- Total: 2835 km (1762 mi)

Track gauge
- 1,435 mm (4 ft 8 1/2 in): 2835 km (1762 mi)

Features
Map
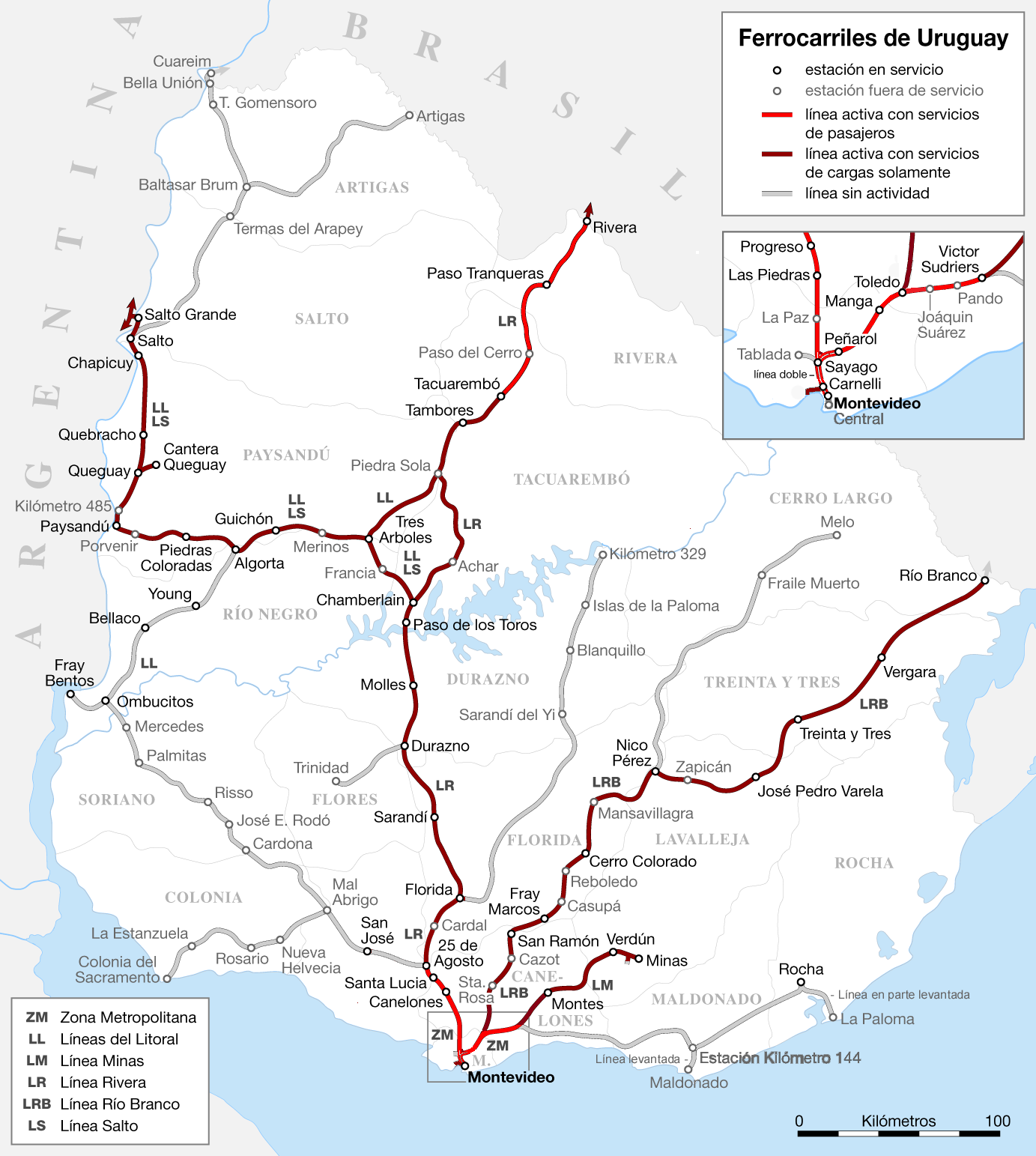
- Uruguay's railway network in 2019. The light red lines are both passenger and freight services; the crimson lines are only available for freight services; the grey lines are out-of-service lines; the black points are open stations; the grey points are out-of-service stations.

The Uruguayan railway network has about 2900 km (1802 mi) of lines, all of 1,435 mm (4 ft 8 1/2 in) gauge, diesel traction with only 11 km (7 mi) of double track. Only half of the network is currently active. All the Uruguayan lines start from Montevideo, connecting the cities of Paysandú, Salto, Rivera and Río Branco. The rest of the lines (closed) connected the capital city with Fray Bentos, Cuareim, Artigas, Km. 329, Melo, La Paloma and Colonia del Sacramento.

== History ==
=== Beginning ===
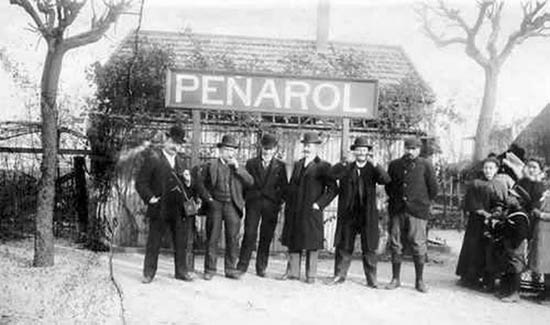
Managers and technical staff of the Central Uruguay Railway (CUR) at Peñarol station, c. 1900

The work of building the first railway line in Uruguay began on April 25, 1867, with the opening of a branch between Paso del Molino and Cerro which consisted of a horse-drawn train. The national "Ferrocarril Central" had obtained the concession for the laying of tracks to Durazno, 205 km from Montevideo. However, for more than a decade they had submitted projects to no avail. The first 18 kilometres (11 mi) branch between Bella Vista and Las Piedras, was inaugurated on 1 January 1869.

To continue the extension of the line and due to lack of capital in the country, many loans were contracted in London, where, as a control, a directory was established. Due to financial problems and high costs of the national administration, the British acquired the majority stake. The Central Uruguay Railway, the largest British company operating in the country, was formally born on 1 January 1878. By this time, several companies had appeared, such as the Midland Uruguay Railway. Although they were started by national capitals, they ended under British control as they were unable to find capital in the country to complete the works.

=== Expansion ===
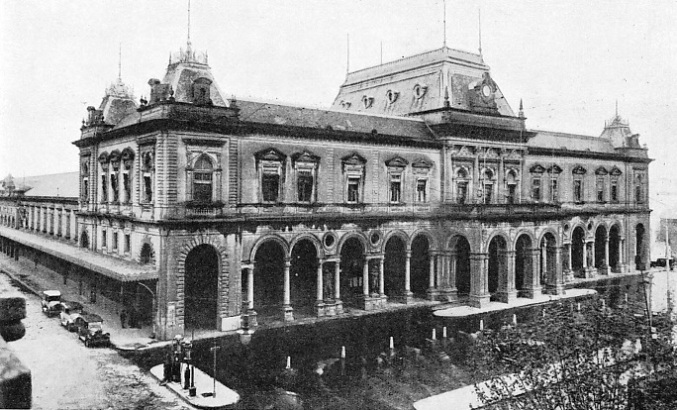
the Estación Central General Artigas was opened in 1897

In 1884 the Government promulgated the "Ley de Trazado General de Ferrocarriles" (Railways General Routes Law) that designed and regulated the railway network in the country. That plan established a radial system, where all the lines joined in Montevideo, the main port of Uruguay by then. Concessions were granted to British companies for a period of 25 years. After that term of exploitation, the State was responsible for expropriating the railway lines if case of non-compliance by the concessionaries.

Lines were assigned to the following companies:

- Ferrocarril Central del Uruguay (Montevideo–Rivera with branches to Salto and Paysandú)
- Ferrocarril de Montevideo a Colonia through Barra de Santa Lucia and Rosario
- Ferrocarril del Oeste (25 de Agosto to Carmelo and Nueva Palmira via San José and branch to Mercedes)
- Ferrocarril Nordeste (Montevideo–Artigas (today Río Branco) via San Ramón and Melo, with branch to Minas
- Ferrocarril Uruguayo del Este (Montevideo–Laguna Merim via Pando, Maldonado, San Carlos and Rocha)
- Ferrocarril de Salto a Santa Rosa (today Cuareim), with branch to San Eugenio (today Artigas)

=== State intervention ===
In 1915 the Government of Uruguay took over the Montevideo–Santiago Vázquez line, then making a similar procedure with other two broken lines. Therefore, the "Administración de Ferrocarriles y Tranvías del Estado" (FTE) was created. That State-owned company continued the expansion of the national railway network, although most of the projects were not carried out. The state services arrived in Montevideo running on Central Railway tracks. The government also built roads to compete with the British companies still operating in the country.

=== Nationalization ===
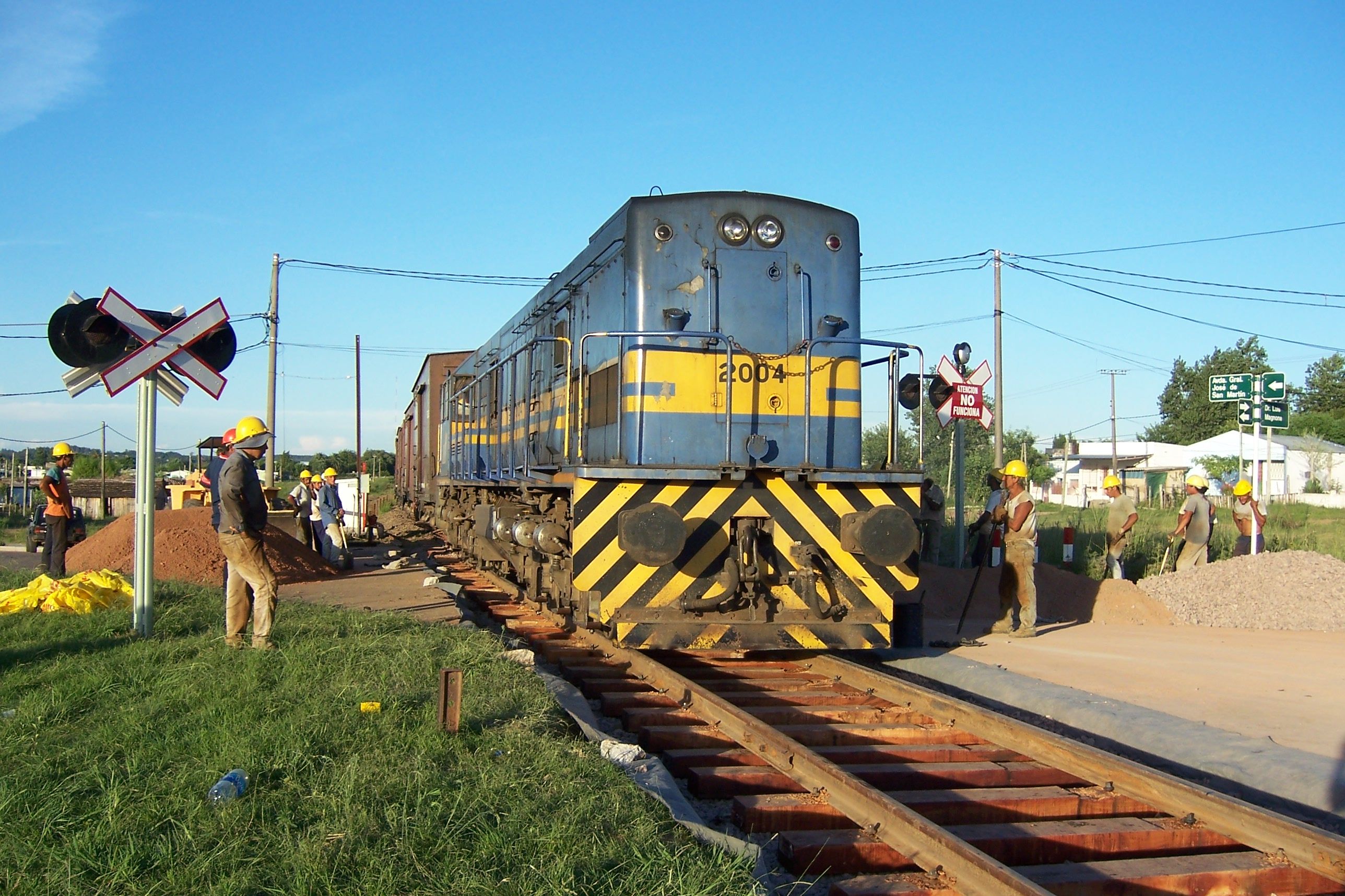
Canadian General Electric Locomotive C-18. The picture was taken during the renovation of existing level crossing at the San Martin Avenue in the city of Tacuarembó

Following what was then a worldwide trend, the private companies were nationalised in 1948, the parliament approved the projects for the acquisition of foreign railroads, charging and part of the debt of 17 million pounds that the United Kingdom had with Uruguay because of purchases made during the Second World War.

=== Narrow gauge ===
There were four big narrow gauge railway lines in Uruguay:

- Puerto del Sauce (now Juan Lacaze) – Terminal: 3 ft (914 mm), (1901–1959)
- Piriápolis – Pan de Azucar: 750 mm (2 ft 5 1/2 in) (1903–1958)
- km 393-Arrozal 33: 600 mm (1 ft 11 5/8 in)
- km 110 – Cantera Burgueño: 600 mm (1 ft 11 5/8 in).

== Passenger services ==
The Tacuarembó-Rivera rail line in northern Uruguay is currently the only section in Uruguay where passenger trains are in operation.

== Renovation plans ==
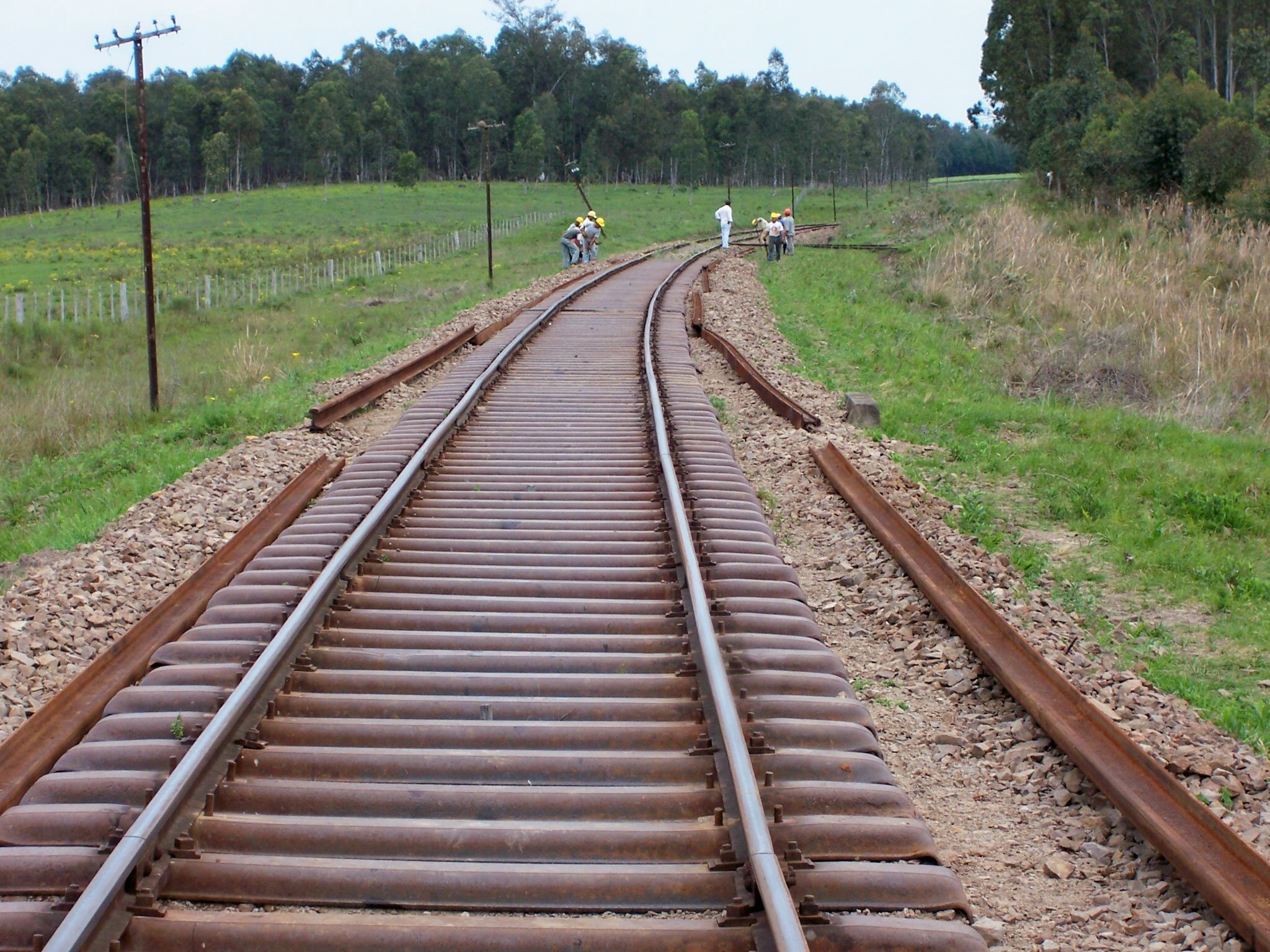
Renovation work on the Pintado – Rivera line

The state railway administration AFE has announced that starting January, 2010, 377 km of track will be renewed on the Pintado – Rivera railway of the central main line. The contract for the repair of railways covers in particular the section from Pintado (Florida) and Chamberlain (Tacuarembó) based on the change of wooden ties, and from there to Rivera on the border with Brazil, part of the international branch located along the border with the city of Santana do Livramento, in Rio Grande do Sul, Brazil using rail supplied by Russia given in lieu of a debt and wooden ties imported from Paraguay. The programme will cost US$30m.

== International links ==
- Argentina – 1,435 mm (4 ft 8 1/2 in) freight rail connection over the Salto Grande Bridge. Passenger service was reinaugurated on this line on August 29, 2011, using second-hand Dutch Wadloper trains; it closed again in May 2012.
- Brazil – break-of-gauge, 1,435 mm (4 ft 8 1/2 in) gauge (Uruguay) / 1,000 mm (3 ft 3 3/8 in) gauge (Santana do Livramento, Brazil).

== See also ==
- Rail transport by country
- Railway stations in Uruguay
- Transport in Uruguay
