= Central Uruguay Railway =

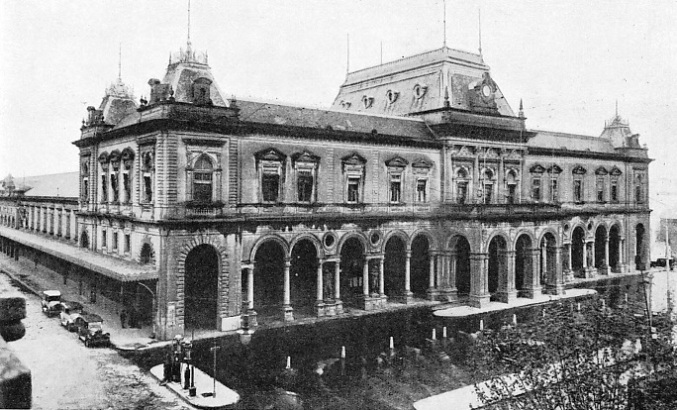
Estación Central General Artigas of Montevideo was built by the CUR. It was closed in 2003

The Central Uruguay Railway (CUR) was one of the five original rail systems in Uruguay. The other four were the Midland Uruguay Railway Co., the North Western of Uruguay, the Uruguay Northern, and the Uruguay East Coast Railway. CUR, including its leased and worked lines, was considered the most important system. It controlled about 1,560 kilometres (970 miles) of track. The system operated four sections: the Central Uruguay Railway Original Line (including the Northeastern Line), 436 km (271 miles); the Northern Extension Railway, 298 km (185 miles); the Eastern Extension Railway, 501 km (311 miles); and the Western Extension Railway, 340 km (211 miles).

== Overview ==
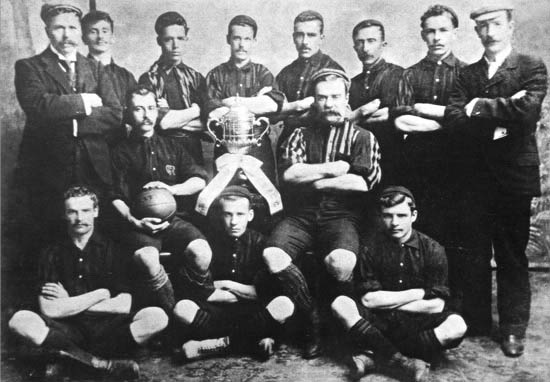
The Central Uruguay Railway Cricket Club (CURCC) took the name of the company. Pictured, the 1900 football team, posing with the cup won

Central Uruguay Railway Co. of Montevideo, Ltd. was registered In London in 1876. It was the largest railway company in Uruguay. It operated from 1 January 1878 to 3 January 1949, when railroads were nationalized. It worked, leased and absorbed some smaller rail systems. By the end of the era of British railways in Uruguay, CUR had a network of 1,665 km (1,035 mi) standard gauge, about half of the total within the country. In 1891, CUR's British and Uruguayan employees founded the Central Uruguay Railway Cricket Club.

== Routes ==
The Central Co. included the Central Uruguay and the Northeastern lines. It operated the lines of the Western Extension, the Northern Extension, and the Eastern Extension companies. The Central ran from Montevideo to Santa Isabel, across the Rio Negro, with a branch from Santa Lucia to San José de Mayo; the Northeastern connected Montevideo and Minas. The Western Extension ran from San Jose to Mercedes, with a branch to the port of Colonia. The Northern Extension continued the Central from Santa Izabel to Rivera on the Brazilian border. The Eastern Extension started from a point on the Northeastern 32 km (20 mi) from Montevideo and ran to Melo, with a branch to Treinta y Tres.

== Rolling stock ==
In 1884 the company owned 18 steam locomotives, 31 coaches and 282 goods wagons. By 1936, the rolling stock had increased to 128 locomotives, 119 coaches and 2302 freight wagons.

== See also ==
- Central Uruguay Railway Cricket Club
- Rail transport in Uruguay
