= Golwé locomotive =

Belgium articulated steam locomotive

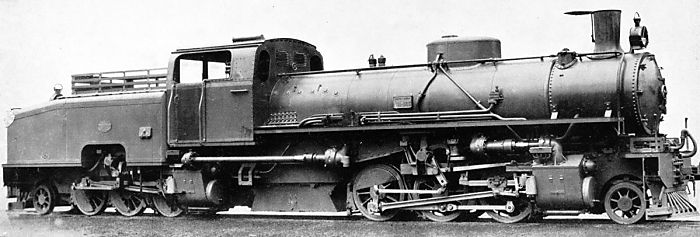
Golwé locomotive for the Ivory Coast

The Golwé was a type of articulated steam locomotive manufactured in Belgium for use in French West African colonies.

== Design ==
The design was patented in 1924, as the work of G. Goldschmidt and A. Weber, managing director and chief engineer of the Société Haine St. Pierre in Belgium.

A single rigid frame ran the length of the locomotive and carried the boiler, fuel and water. The front engine unit swivelled under the boiler and smokestack, in a similar manner to a Meyer and looking somewhat like a Mallet; in contrast a Garratt had its front bogie in front of the boiler. The rear engine unit was placed underneath the tender, in a manner similar to a Garratt; however, while a Garratt carried both coal and water directly on the rear bogie, the Golwé had its fuel bunker mounted on the central frame. The water tank was mounted directly on the rear steam bogie and embraced the fuel bunker and rear end of the main frame. The rear bogie cylinders were placed under the cab, at the front of the rear unit. A float-controlled automatic device increased the cut-off of the rear cylinders to prevent slipping when the water tank was running low. The firebox hung low between the two engine units and so could be of generous size.

== Use ==
Four 2-6-0+0-6-2 locomotives were supplied to the metre-gauge Ivory Coast railways in 1930, and three to the Congo-Ocean Railway in the French Congo. The Congo-Ocean railway received two more of the same type in 1935 and five of a modified 2-6-0+0-6-4 type. Both railways later turned to Beyer-Garratt locomotives for their articulated locomotive needs.
