= Brazil Great Southern Railway =

The Brazil Great Southern Railway (BGS) was founded in 1877. It was developed by Jose Candido Gomes who, with English investors, created the Brazil Great Southern Railway Company Limited. The company was registered under the English Companies Act on January 11, 1883. Its office was located at No. 14 Queen Victoria Street, London. Its directors included Major-General J. P. Beadle, D. M. Fox, H. A. Cowper, Charles Neate, Charles Sanderson.

The Brazil Great Southern Railway operated 186 miles (299 km) of railway, in the State of Rio Grande do Sul, the terminals being located at Quarahim, on the border with Uruguay, and at Itaqui. Along with the North Western of Uruguay Railway Company, it held one-half of the share capital of the Quarahim International Bridge Co., Ltd., and jointly guaranteed that the bridge company tolls would be sufficient to meet the annual interest and sinking fund on the bridge company's debenture stock. After 1905, the GBS merged with the Rio Grande do Sul state network. By 1919, the government of Brazil owned the system and leased it to the English company, which operated it; the Brazil Great Southern Railway Extensions, Ltd., built and operated an extension from Itaqui to Sao Borja.
