= Uruguay Northern Railway =

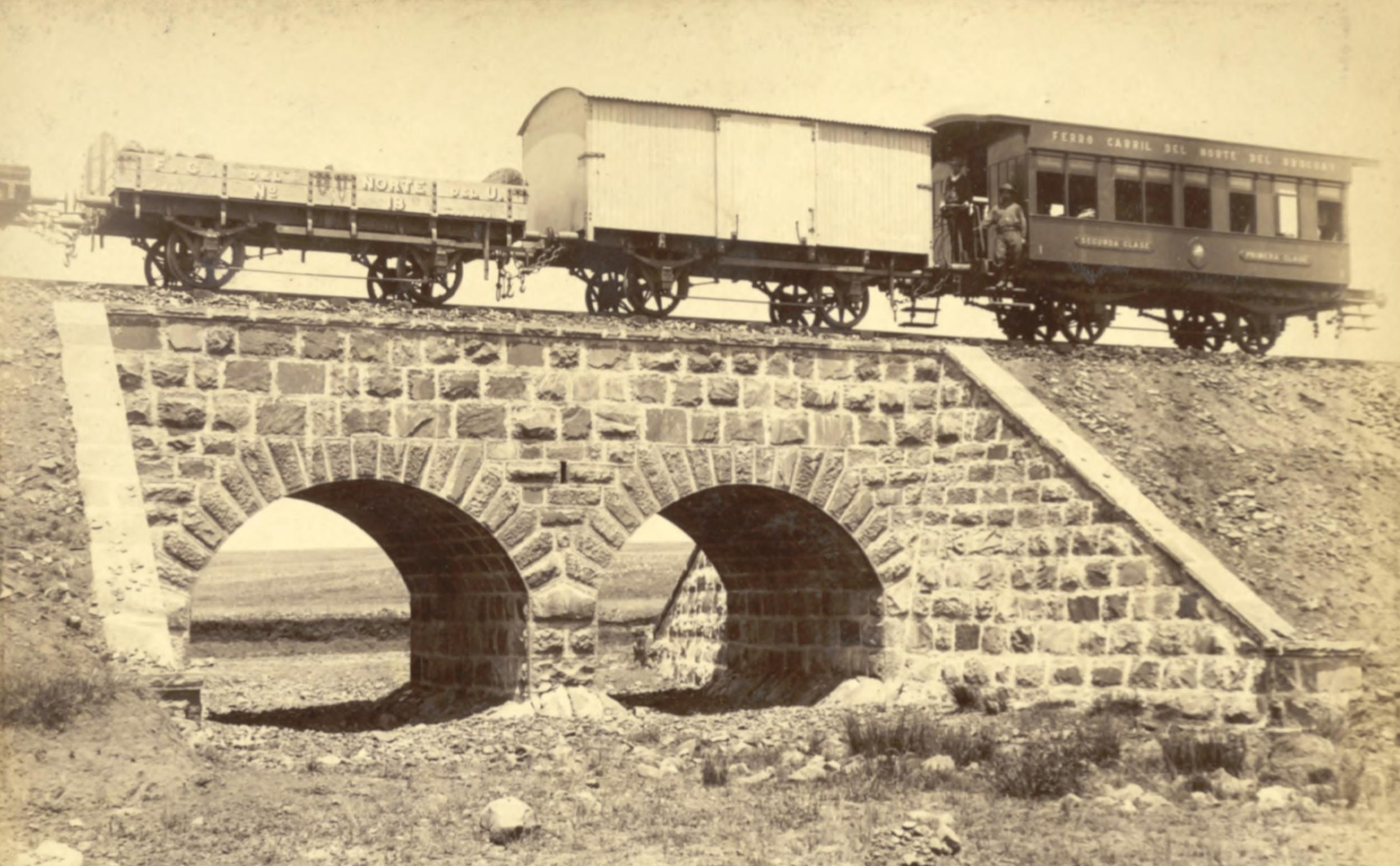
Small train on a bridge, 1891

The Uruguay Northern Railway was one of the five original rail systems in Uruguay. The other four were the Midland Uruguay Railway Co., the North Western of Uruguay, the Central Uruguay Railway, and the Uruguay East Coast Railway. The Uruguay Northern Railway Co., Ltd. was registered in London in 1887; The company's first meeting was held in November 1889 at No. 16, St. Helen's Place, Bishopsgate Street, London.

It was the smallest line of the initial four British rail systems. When opened on April 17, 1891, it stretched for 114 kilometres (71 mi) of 1,435 mm (4 ft 8 1/2 in). The line extended from Isla de Cabellos to San Eugenio on the border with Brazil. In 1936, there were only five steam locomotives, three coaches and 157 goods wagons. It closed in 1987.
