= Midland Uruguay Railway =

Railway in Uruguay

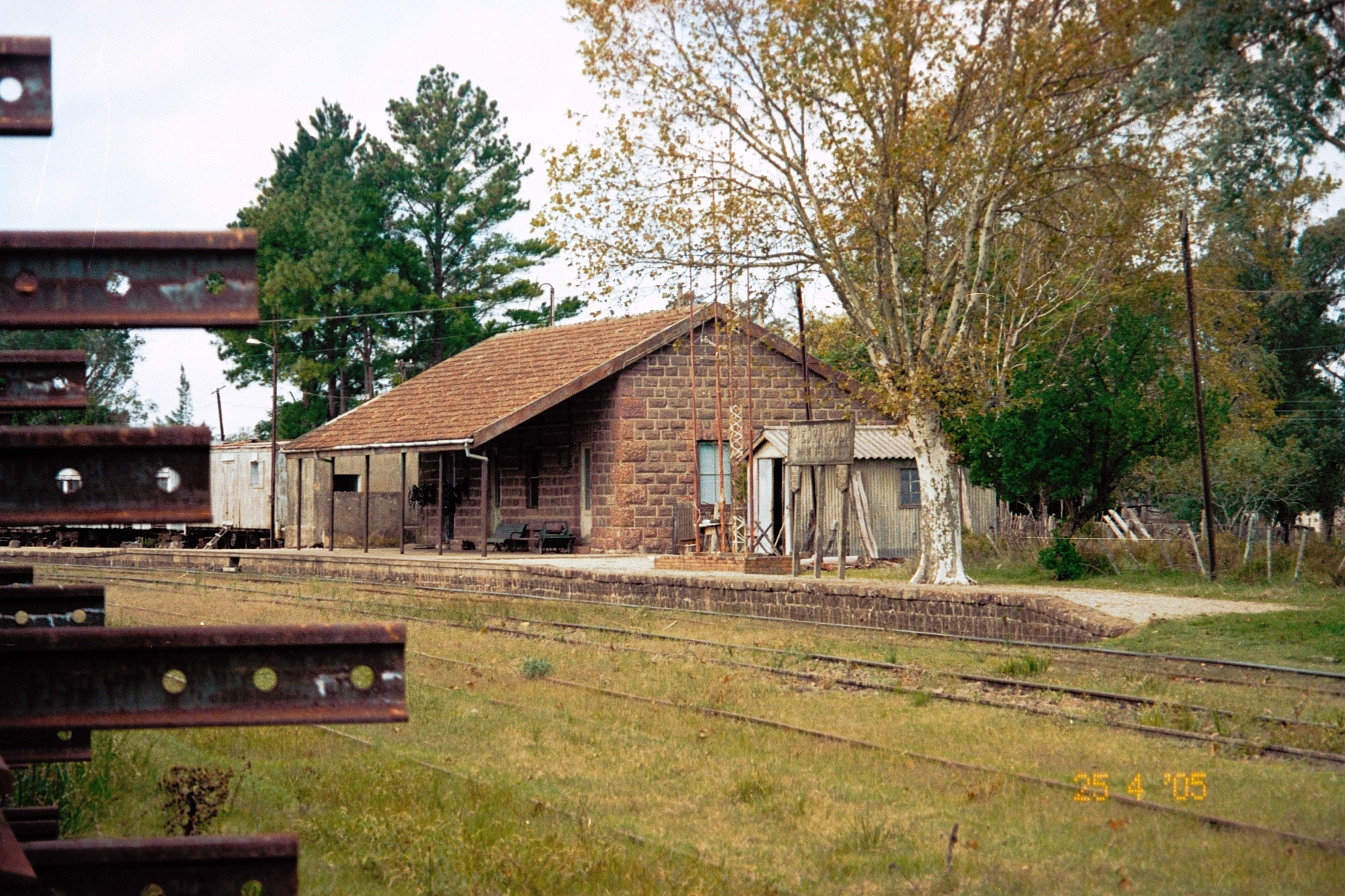
Midland Uruguay Railway line at the Piedra Sola station.

The Midland Uruguay Railway was the second most important of five rail lines in Uruguay's early rail history. The other four systems were the Central Uruguay Railway Co., the North Western of Uruguay, the Uruguay Northern, and the Uruguay East Coast Railway. The Midland Uruguay Railway Co., Ltd. was registered In London In 1887 with capital of $3,000,000.

The Midland opened on August 15, 1889 with the 318 kilometres (198 mi) line between Paso de los Toros and Salto. It ran for 525 kilometres (326 mi) on Standard gauge. The branch from Algorta/Fray Bentos was opened in its entirety August 17, 1911. Another 58 kilometres (36 mi) from Piedra Sola were opened on April 10, 1913. In 1936, there were 22 steam locomotives, one railcar, 20 coaches and 484 goods wagons. It remained independent until 1949. The railway ran northward and westward. The main line ran for 315 km (196 mi), passing through Tres Arboles, Algorta, and Paysandú, before terminating at Salto.
