= Jubileo, Entre Ríos =

Coordinates: 31°44′S 58°37′W

Jubileo (Entre Ríos)
- Municipality and village
- Interactive map of Jubileo (Entre Ríos)
- Country: Argentina
- Province: Entre Ríos Province
- Time zone: UTC−3 (ART)

Jubileo (Entre Ríos) is a village and municipality in Entre Ríos Province in north-eastern Argentina.
