= Mal Abrigo =

Coordinates: 34°08′48″S 56°57′10″W

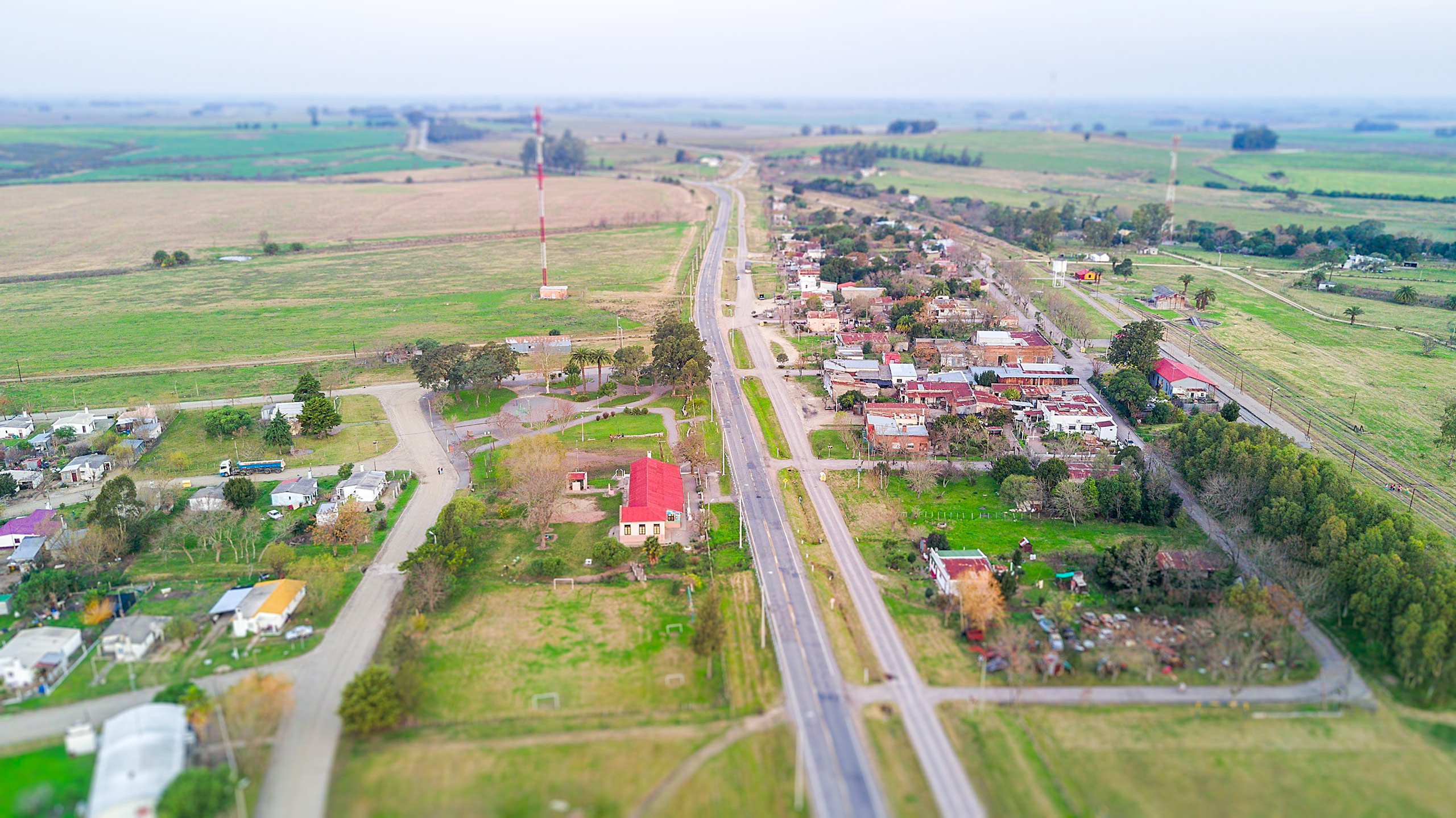
- Interactive map of Mal Abrigo
- Country: Uruguay
- Department: San Jose

Population
  - Total: 373
- Time zone: UTC - 3
- Postal code: 80003

Mal Abrigo is a small town in San José Department, Uruguay.

== Geography ==
The town is located in the western part of the department of San José, on the San José ridge, and at km 124 of Route 23. It is 35 km from the departmental capital San José de Mayo.

== History ==
Mal Abrigo arose from the extension of the railway lines that linked San José de Mayo with Rosario and Puerto Sauce, which began service on August 27, 1899, and the Mal Abrigo - Mercedes line, which began operating in 1902. The lands occupied by the station were acquired by the Ferrocarril Central del Uruguay (Uruguay railway company), on August 17, 1898, to Ramón Aydó and Carvis, and on February 21, 1900, to Bautista Echeverría. Mal Abrigo station was located 131km along the railway, while an area called Santa Exequiela emerged between it and the national road that led to Mercedes.

The first subdivision was carried out in December 1899, according to a plan by surveyor Manuel D. Rodríguez, and in this the first 5 blocks were created. The first three streets of the new town were named after prominent Uruguayan political figures Aparicio Saravia, Manuel Oribe and Juan Antonio Lavalleja. In 1907 the first state school in the town, la escuela N.º 60., began operating. Later, the remaining blocks were divided into sections, but it was not until April 1958 that surveyor Peter Alvez drew up a general plan of the current town.

In 1931, the Local Board was installed, which initially operated in private premises until 1962, when it was moved to its own premises. On July 1, 1935, a bill was presented to the House of Representatives to elevate the population centre called Mal Abrigo to the category of town with the name Manuel Artigas, however the project, approved by the House of Representatives on March 17, 1936, was not sanctioned. On September 9, 1977, 52 homes built by MEVIR (Honorary Commission for the Eradication of Unhealthy Rural Housing) were inaugurated in Mal Abrigo, which allowed the expansion of the town.

== Population ==
The town has a population of 373 inhabitants, according to the 2023 census.

Demographic evolution of Mal Abrigo
1963	1975	1985	1996	2004	2011	2023
346	231	331	412	370	344	373
(Source: INE)

== Economy ==
The town is located in a purely rural area, with the main source of employment being in the surrounding farms, especially medium and large extensions dedicated to livestock farming.
