= San José palace =

Coordinates: 32°25′38″S 58°31′22.34″W

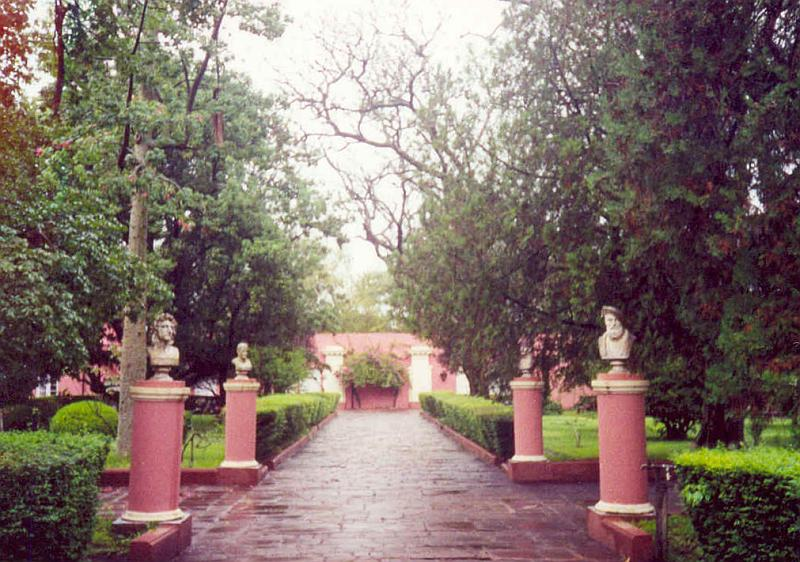
A path in the garden of the San José Palace, showing the busts of Hernán Cortés, Napoleon, Alexander the Great and Julius Caesar.

The San José Palace (in Spanish, Palacio San José) is the former personal residence of Justo José de Urquiza, Argentine caudillo, general, politician and President of the Argentine Confederation from 1854 to 1860. The Palace is now the setting of the Justo José de Urquiza Museum and National Monument.

The Palace is located in the countryside, 23 kilometres (14 mi) from the city of Concepción del Uruguay, in the province of Entre Ríos. It was designed by architect Pedro Fossati and built between 1848 and 1858.

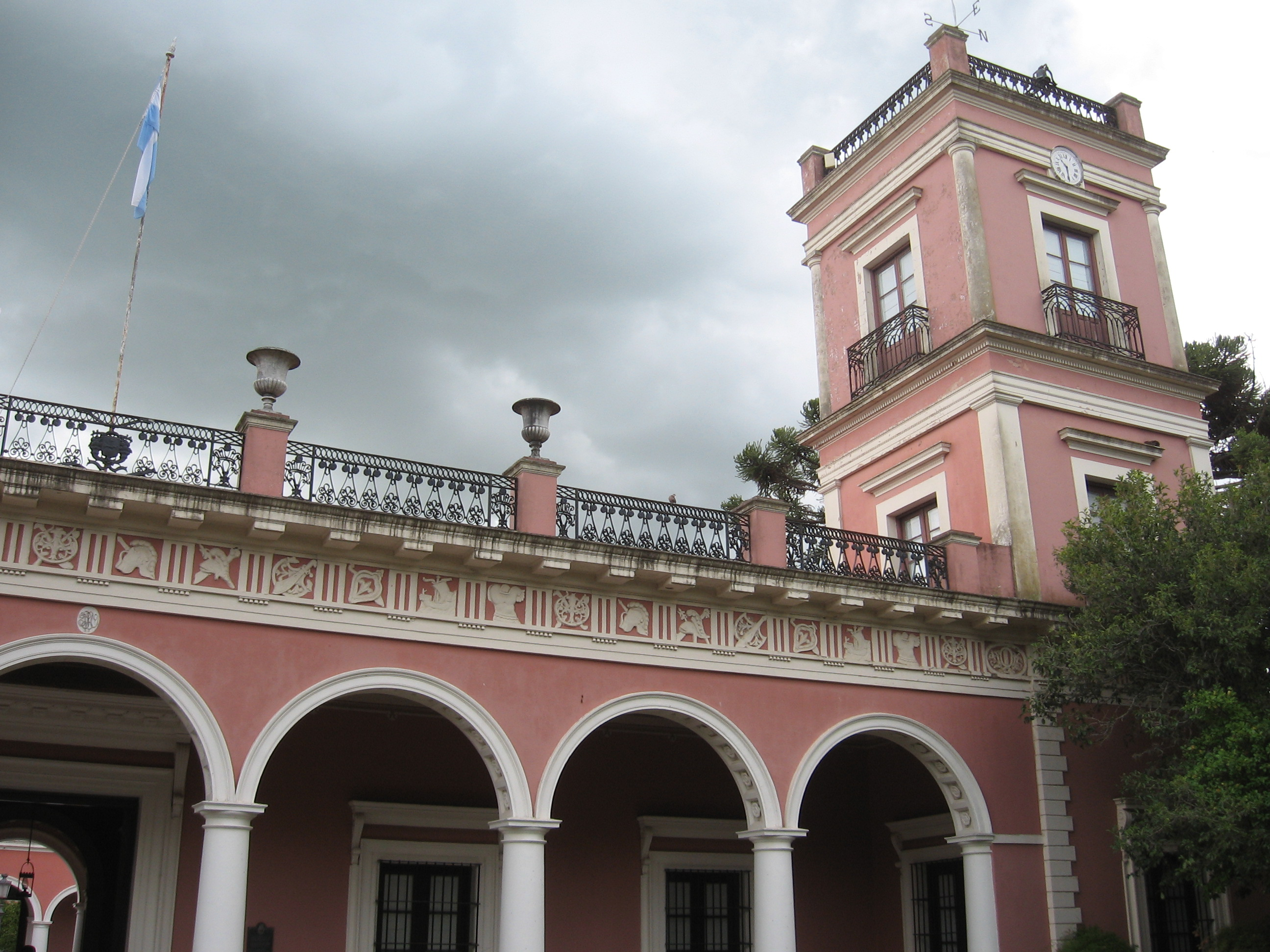
A view of one of the towers of the Palace.

The Palace is a model of mid-19th-century Italian-Argentine architecture. The main floor has two large courtyards surrounded by 38 rooms, as well as an archive, a library, a playroom, a large dining room, kitchens, a chapel, and two surveillance towers. One can find such luxuries as Italian marbles, French mirrors, and gold-plated roofs. The archives treasure important historical documents, antiques, paintings of Urquiza's battles, and even manifests of ships that landed on Concepción's port. These features are very well preserved; in many cases visitors are only allowed to watch and take photographs from the outside of the rooms.

The building was the first in the country to have a complete system of running water (Buenos Aires still lacked such a system by 1870). Pipes brought the water from the Gualeguaychú River, 2 kilometres (1.2 mi) away.

The Palace served as a political stage; here, foreign diplomats were hosted and international treaties were signed. The Apostolic Nuncio, military leaders and important politicians were also received here.

Urquiza was assassinated in the Palace on the night of 11 April 1870 by followers of Ricardo López Jordán, a federal dissident. The bloodied prints of Urquiza's hand are preserved in the room where this took place, which was then turned into an oratorium by his wife.

The Palace was declared National Monument by law on 30 August 1935.

== Sources ==
- Palacio San José - Official website (in Spanish)
- Museos Argentinos
- Argentina invisible (in Spanish)
