= Médanos, Entre Ríos =

Médanos
- Municipality and village
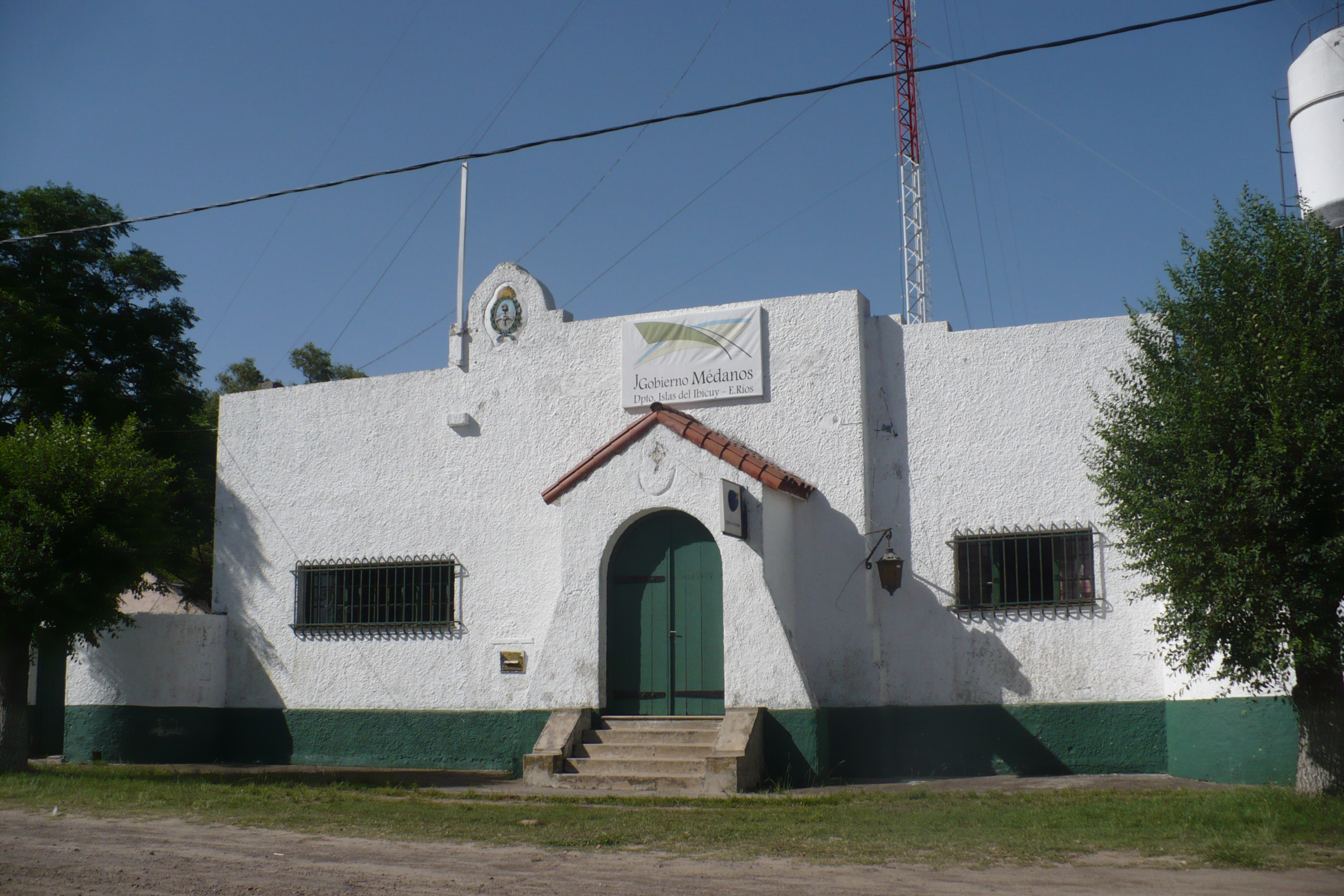
- Town hall of Médanos

- Location within Argentina
- Coordinates: 33°26′08″S 59°04′07″W
- Country: Argentina
- Province: Entre Ríos Province
- Department: Islas del Ibicuy
- Time zone: UTC−3 (ART)

Médanos is a village and municipality in Entre Ríos Province in north-eastern Argentina.
