= Caseros, Entre Ríos =

Municipality and village in Argentina

Coordinates: 32°28′S 58°29′W

Caseros (Entre Ríos)
- Municipality and village
- Interactive map of Caseros (Entre Ríos)
- Country: Argentina
- Province: Entre Ríos Province
- Time zone: UTC−3 (ART)

Caseros (Entre Ríos) is a village and municipality in Entre Ríos Province in north-eastern Argentina.
