= Class 87 =

Class 87 may refer to:

- British Rail Class 87, a class of British electric locomotives
- DRG Class 87, a class of standard German 0-10-0T steam locomotive
