= FS Class 470 =

Italian steam train

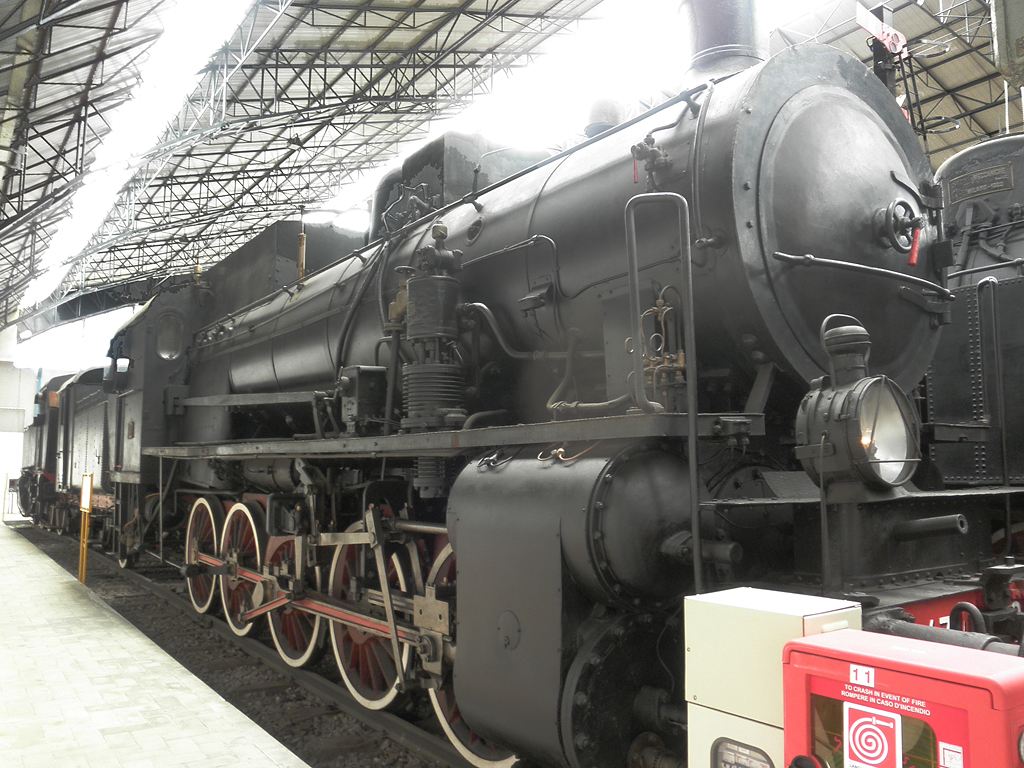
- FS locomotive 470.092 as preserved
Type and origin
- Power type: Steam
- Builder: Maffei (64), Officine Meccaniche (52), Ernesto Breda (10), Officine Meccaniche e Navali di Napoli (17)
- Build date: 1907–1911
- Total produced: 143
Specifications
- Configuration
  - Whyte: 0-10-0
  - UIC: E n4v
- Gauge: 1,435 mm (4 ft 8 1/2 in)
- Driver dia.: 1,370 mm (53.94 in)
- Length: 12,475 mm (40 ft 11.1 in)
- Axle load: 15.1 tonnes (14.9 long tons; 16.6 short tons)
- Loco weight: 74.8 tonnes (73.6 long tons; 82.5 short tons)
- Tender weight: 27.6 tonnes (27.2 long tons; 30.4 short tons)
- Fuel type: Coal
- Fuel capacity: 5,600 kg (12,300 lb)
- Water cap.: 13,000 litres (2,860 imp gal; 3,430 US gal)
- Firebox
  - Grate area: 3.5 m^{2} (38 sq ft)
- Boiler pressure: 16 kg/cm^{2} (1.57 MPa; 228 psi)
- Heating surface: 212.57 m^{2} (2,288.1 sq ft)
- Cylinders: Four (compound)
- High-pressure cylinder: 375 mm × 650 mm (14.76 in × 25.59 in)
- Low-pressure cylinder: 610 mm × 650 mm (24.02 in × 25.59 in)
- Valve gear: Walschaerts
Performance figures
- Maximum speed: 50 km/h (31 mph)
- Power output: 736 kW (987 hp) at 30 km/h (19 mph)
- Tractive effort: 14,200 kgf (139 kN; 31,300 lbf)

The Ferrovie dello Stato Italiane (FS; Italian State Railways) Class 470 (Italian: Gruppo 470) is a 0-10-0 steam locomotive.

== Design and construction ==
The Class 470 locomotive was one of twelve standard designs developed by the FS right after their institution, and was intended for heavy mountain work. The two extreme axles were given a lateral play of 40 millimetres (1.6 in) and the central wheels were without flanges, to allow the locomotive to deal even with sharp curves. The boiler was common with that of the FS Class 680, as was the four-cylinder compound Plancher engine, in which the two high pressure (HP) and the two low pressure (LP) cylinders were respectively grouped together, with each pair being served by a single piston valve via a crossed port arrangement.

The Class 470 was unusual in its appearance because the coal reserves were carried on board it, on the left side of the fully enclosed cab, while the water was carried by a separate tender; this has led some to define them as "semi-tank locomotives".

The Class 470 was built between 1907 and 1911 by Maffei (64 locomotives, 1907–09), Officine Meccaniche (52, 1908–11), Ernesto Breda (10, 1909) and Officine Meccaniche e Navali di Napoli (17, 1909–12), for a total of 143 locomotives.

P. M. Kalla-Bishop suggested that the Midland Railway 0-10-0 "Lickey Banker", which shared with the Class 470 the wheelbase and the crossed port arrangement, may have been inspired by it, as a complete sets of drawings of the Italian locomotive were stored at Derby.

== Modifications ==
=== Classes 471 and 472 ===
From 1918 until the 1930s, all but 14 of the Class 470 were rebuilt with a superheater and reclassified as the Class 471 (while keeping their old running numbers, e.g. the 470.018 became 471.018). From 1924 some of the rebuilt locomotives (24 in total) were also given enlarged HP cylinders of 400 mm (16 in) diameter, and were initially reclassified as Class 472; from 1930, however, these were renumbered in the Class 471 as the subclass 471.2XX. In total, 105 Class 471 and 24 Class 472 locomotives were rebuilt.

109 of the rebuilt 471 and 472 locomotives were also altered from their original semi-tank condition to orthodox tender locomotives, being fitted tenders of the extinct FS Class 290, with a capacity of 6,000 kg (13,000 lb) of coal and 15,000 L (4,000 US gal) of water; later, tenders previously allocated to the FS Class 730, with a capacity of 20,000 L (5,300 US gal) of water, were also fitted to some locomotives.

== Operation ==
Nicknamed "crematorium" by their crews (because of the fully enclosed cab, which made the work environment very hot and uncomfortable for the crews), the Class 470 and 471 locomotives served on steep mountain railways throughout Italy for all of their career, with some being assigned to passenger and freight work on important railways such as the Turin-Genoa railway, the Porrettana railway, the Turin-Modane railway and others.

However, the Class 470 had the dubious honour of being the first Italian steam locomotive to be displaced from a main line by electrification, as in 1907 work on the Giovi section of the Turin-Genoa railway began, with the first tests running in June 1910; on the 3.5% (1 in 28½) steep incline, compared with the Class E.550, the Class 470 was completely outperformed by the smaller and lighter electric locomotive, only managing to pull 170 t at 25 km/h (16 mph), while the latter managed to pull 190 t at 50 km/h (31 mph), while eliminating issues such as most physical effort and smoke in tunnels. This meant that major summit lines would be among the first targets for further electrifications, and the Class 470 were gradually relegated to secondary lines.

The few unrebuilt Class 470 survived until the early 1960s. The last Class 471 locomotives were withdrawn in the early 1970s from service on the Sulmona-Terni railway.

== Preservation ==
One Class 470 locomotive survived into preservation, the 470.092, currently preserved as a static exhibit in the Museo Nazionale della Scienza e della Tecnologia "Leonardo da Vinci" of Milan.

== Bibliography ==
- Cornolò, Giovanni (May 2014). "Locomotive a vapore". TuttoTreno (2).
- Kalla-Bishop, P. M. (1986). Italian state railways steam locomotives : together with low-voltage direct current and three-phase motive power. Abingdon: Tourret Publishing. ISBN 0905878035.
- Pedrazzini, Claudio (2017). Storia dell'elettrificazione e dei locomotori trifasi F.S. Brescia: Club Fermodellistico Bresciano. ISBN 9788894204070.
