= James Anderson (mechanical engineer) =

James Edward Anderson, CBE (3 April 1871 – 15 January 1945) was a mechanical engineer of the Midland Railway and later the London, Midland and Scottish Railway and had a great influence on the latter's adoption of the former's conservative locomotive policies.

== Career ==
Born in 1871, Anderson served an apprenticeship with the Great North of Scotland Railway (GNoSR). He worked for Sharp, Stewart and Company, Dübs and Company and the Glasgow and South Western Railway (GSWR), before becoming Assistant Chief Draughtsmant of Robert Stephenson Ltd of Darlington.

=== Midland Railway ===
In April 1903, Anderson moved to the Midland Railway (MR) at Derby as a draughtsman. He replaced J.W. Smith when the latter left for Great Central Railway, and was also given responsibility for the Locomotive Works in the absence of Henry Fowler.

During Anderson's time at Derby, he helped design the 990 Class 4-4-0, introduced superheating on the Class 4F 0-6-0 and to the rebuilt Class 2P 4-4-0, and constructed both large 2-8-0s for the Somerset and Dorset Joint Railway and the Lickey Banker 0-10-0 for the Lickey Incline. These departed from the Midland's small engine policy.

Anderson was acting chief mechanical engineer between 1915 and 1919 when Fowler was away on war work and was appointed a CBE in March 1920 for his own war work.

=== London, Midland and Scottish Railway ===
When the Midland was grouped into the London, Midland and Scottish Railway (LMS) in 1923, Anderson was appointed Chief Motive Power Superintendent of the new company. As such, he and Fowler were able to influence the LMS to follow Midland practice in locomotive design rather than that of the London and North Western Railway (LNWR), or indeed that of any other constituent. This generally included the use of standard small axle bearings and short travel valves, resulting in hot boxes and poor efficiency and running counter to locomotive developments pursued by the other three Big Four railways in the 1920s.

Anderson retired in 1932. Later that year, William Stanier arrived from the Great Western Railway with a particular remit (from the President of the LMS, Sir Josiah Stamp) to reform the Motive Power department of the LMS.

== Retirement ==
Anderson retired in 1932 to Ayr. He died in 1945.
