= 2-8-0+0-8-2 =

Garratt locomotive wheel arrangement

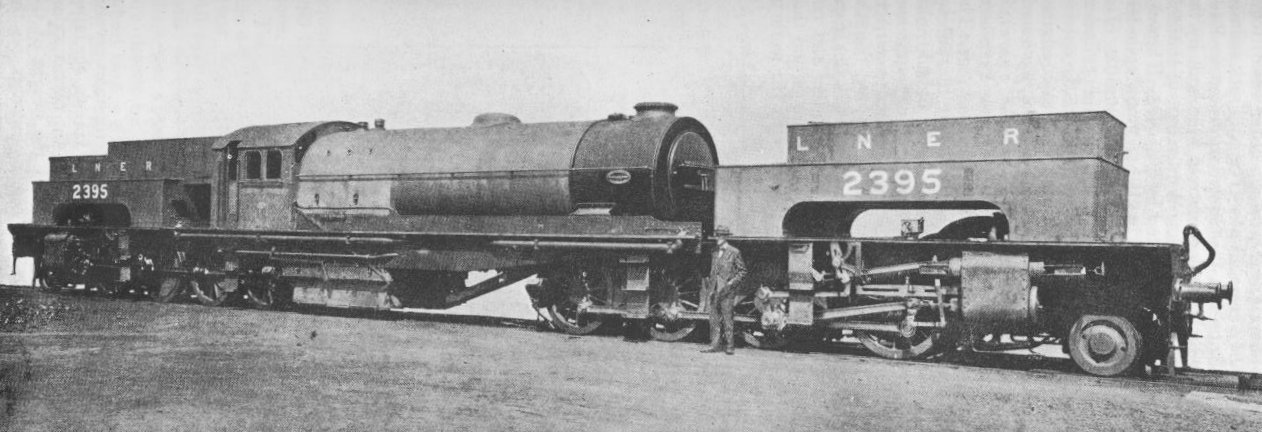
- The sole LNER Class U1 Garratt
Equivalent classifications
- UIC class: 1D+D1, 1'D+D1'
- French class: 140+041
- Turkish class: 45+45
- Swiss class: 4/5+4/5, 8/10 from 1920s
- Russian class: 1-4-0+0-4-1
First known tank engine version
- First use: 1924
- Country: Burma
- Locomotive: Class GA.I
- Railway: Burma Railways
- Designer: Beyer, Peacock & Company
- Builder: Beyer, Peacock & Company

Under the Whyte notation for the classification of steam locomotives by wheel arrangement, the 2-8-0+0-8-2 is a Garratt locomotive. The wheel arrangement is effectively two 2-8-0 locomotives operating back to back, with the boiler and cab suspended between the two power units. Each power unit has a single pair of leading wheels in a leading truck, followed by four coupled pairs of driving wheels and no trailing wheels.

A similar wheel arrangement exists for Mallet type locomotives, but is referred to as 2-8-8-2 since only the front engine unit swivels.

== Overview ==
This Garratt wheel arrangement was somewhat common, especially for locomotives intended for freight service. The first 2-8-0+0-8-2 locomotive was a single metre gauge locomotive built by Beyer, Peacock & Company in 1924 for the Burma Railways as their class GA.I. The second, and perhaps the better known, was the single Class U1 of the London & North Eastern Railway (LNER), built in 1925.

2-8-0+0-8-2 Garratt production list – All manufacturers
Gauge	Railway	Class	Works no.	Units	Year	Builder
1,000 mm	Burma Railways	GA.I	6180	1	1924	Beyer, Peacock & Company
1,000 mm	Burma Railways	GA.II	6354	1	1927	Beyer, Peacock & Company
1,000 mm	Burma Railways	GA.III	6411-6413	3	1927	Beyer, Peacock & Company
1,000 mm	War Department, Bengal Assam Railway	Light	7112-7121	10	1943	Beyer, Peacock & Company
1,000 mm	Burma Railways	GA.IV	1077-1084	8	1929	Krupp
4 ft 8 1/2 in	London & North Eastern Railway	U1	6209	1	1925	Beyer, Peacock & Company
4 ft 8 1/2 in	Ottoman Railways, Turkey		6324	1	1927	Beyer, Peacock & Company
4 ft 8 1/2 in	Mauritius Railway		6381-6383	3	1927	Beyer, Peacock & Company
5 ft 6 in	Bengal Nagpur Railway, India	HSG	6261-6262	2	1925	Beyer, Peacock & Company

== Use ==
=== Burma ===
Apart from their first single class GA.I locomotive of 1924, the 1,000 mm (3 ft 3 3/8 in) metre gauge Burma Railways acquired another locomotive from Beyer, Peacock & Company in 1927, classifying it GA.II. In that same year, another four of class GA.III were placed in service, also from Beyer, Peacock. In 1929, Krupp of Essen in Germany delivered eight more, designated Class GA.IV.

=== India ===
The 5 ft 6 in (1,676 mm) Bengal Nagpur Railway in India used two of the class HSG, built by Beyer, Peacock & Company in 1925.

Ten 1,000 mm (3 ft 3 3/8 in) metre gauge examples were purchased by the British War Department in 1943 and used on the Bengal Assam Railway in India as their Class MWGX.

=== Mauritius ===
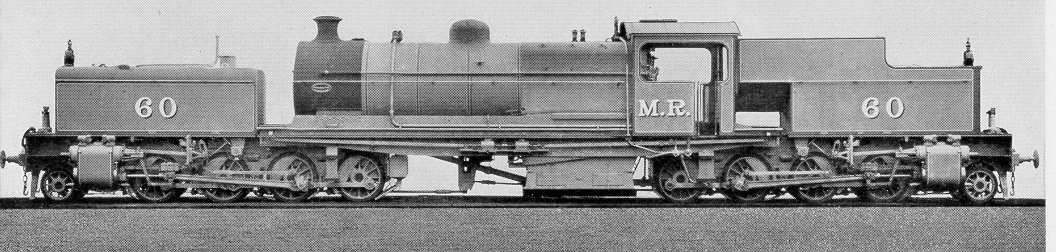
Mauritius Railway no. 60

The Mauritius Railway owned three 4 ft 8 1/2 in (1,435 mm) standard gauge 2-8-0+0-8-2 Garratts, also built by Beyer, Peacock & Company in 1927.

=== Turkey ===
The Ottoman Railways in Turkey acquired a single 4 ft 8 1/2 in (1,435 mm) standard gauge 2-8-0+0-8-2 Garratt from Beyer, Peacock & Company in 1927.

=== United Kingdom ===
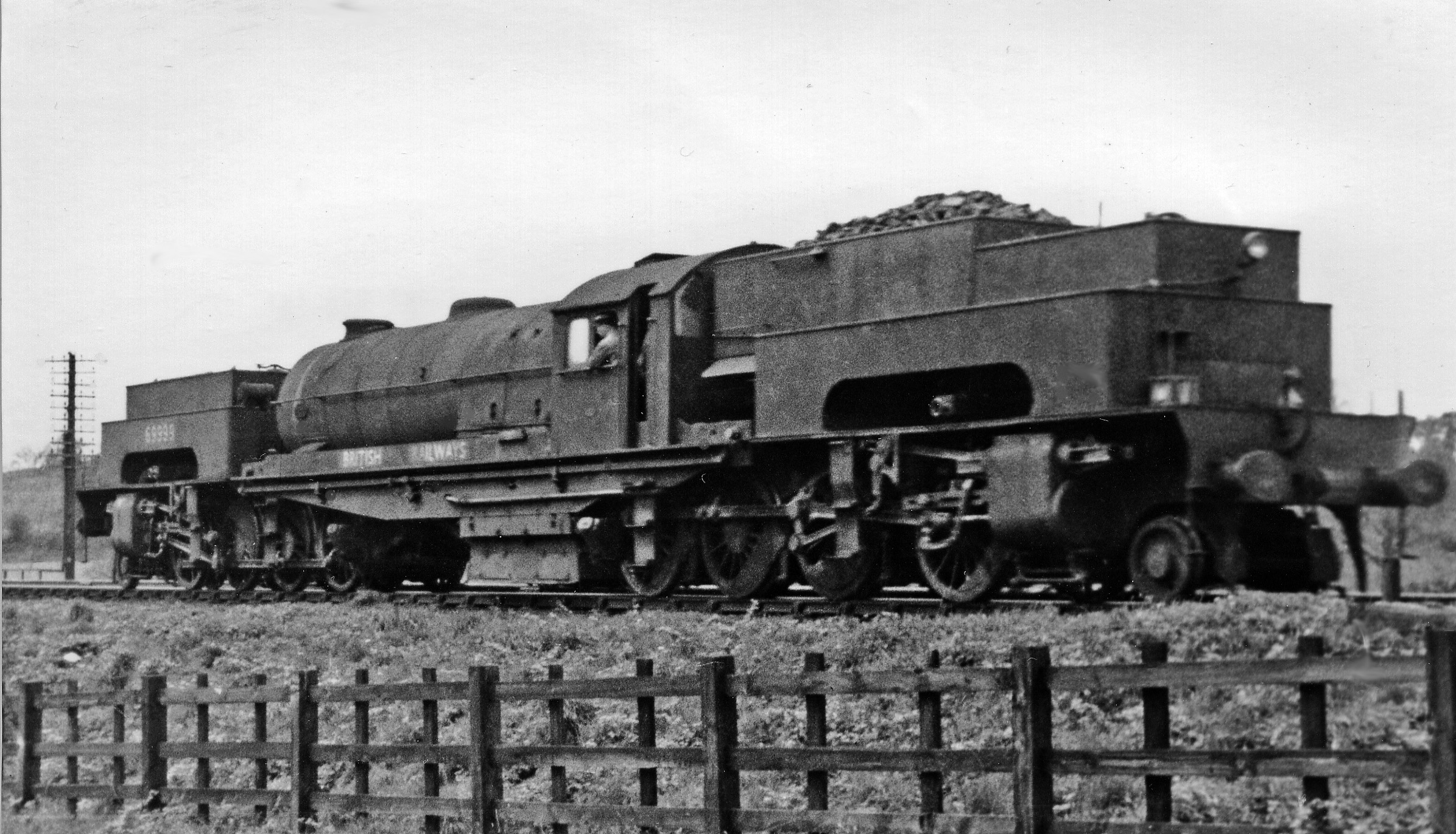
Class U1 on the Lickey Incline, 1949

The London and North Eastern Railway (LNER) owned a single Class U1 Garratt, built by Beyer, Peacock & Company in 1925. It was designed by Nigel Gresley for banking coal trains over the Worsborough Bank, a steeply graded line in South Yorkshire and part of the Woodhead line. The Class U1 was both the longest and the most powerful steam locomotive ever to run in the United Kingdom.
