= South West African 0-10-0 =

GSWA Ten-Coupled Tender 0-10-0 South West African 0-10-0
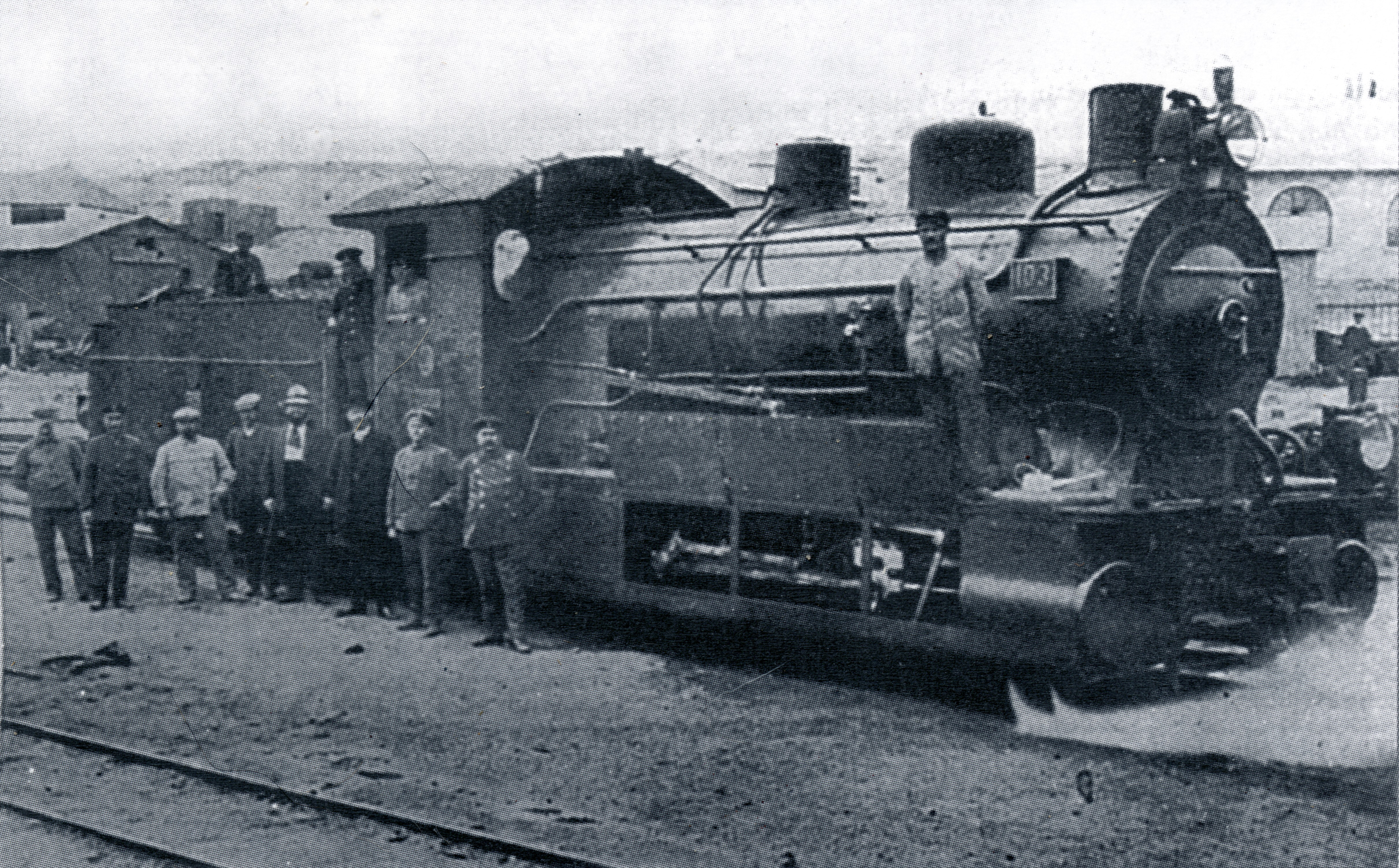
- South West African 0-10-0 no. 103, c. 1911
Type and origin
- Power type: Steam
- Designer: Henschel & Son
- Builder: Henschel & Son
- Serial number: D10159-D10164
- Build date: 1910
- Total produced: 6
Specifications
- Configuration
  - Whyte: 0-10-0 (Decapod)
  - UIC: En2
- Gauge: 3 ft 6 in (1,067 mm) Cape gauge
- Coupled dia.: 48 in (1,219 mm)
- Frame type: Plate
- Total weight: 74 LT (75,190 kg)
- Fuel type: Coal
- Firebox
  - Type: Round-top
  - Grate area: 20.5 sq ft (1.90 m^{2})
- Boiler
  - Small tubes: 223: 1 13/16 in (46 mm)
- Boiler pressure: 171 psi (1,179 kPa)
- Heating surface: 1,206 sq ft (112.0 m^{2})
- Cylinders: Two
- Cylinder size: 18 1/2 in (470 mm) bore 20 5/8 in (524 mm) stroke
- Valve gear: Heusinger
- Valve type: Murdoch's D slide
- Couplers: Buffer-and-chains
Performance figures
- Tractive effort: 16,220 lbf (72.2 kN) @ 75%
Career
- Operators: Lüderitzbucht Eisenbahn
- Number in class: 6
- Numbers: LE 101-106
- Delivered: 1911
- First run: 1911

The South West African 0-10-0 of 1911 was a steam locomotive from the German South West Africa era.

In 1911, the Lüderitzbucht Eisenbahn (Lüderitzbucht Railway) in German South West Africa placed six locomotives with a 0-10-0 Decapod type wheel arrangement in service. They were no longer in service when all railways in the territory came under the administration of the South African Railways in 1922.

== Manufacturer ==
Six locomotives with a 0-10-0 Decapod type wheel arrangement were built in 1910 by Henschel & Son of Kassel in Germany for a French Colony in Africa. The engines were rejected by French inspectors, however, and they were purchased by the German government for £2,000 each in 1911, on behalf of the Lüderitzbucht-Gesellschaft company who leased the Lüderitzbucht Eisenbahn and shared the profits with the government.

== Characteristics ==
The locomotive had flat "D" type sliding valves which were actuated by Heusinger valve gear, with Laird type crossheads with single slide bars. To protect the motion from wind-blown sand in the Namib Desert, it had plate shields arranged along the full length of the engine, hinged on the running board to allow access to the motion.

The engine was built on a 3/4 inch (19 millimetres) thick plate frame, strengthened with 1 1/4 inches (32 millimetres) stretchers. It had coupled wheels of 48 inches (1,219 millimetres) diameter and cylinders of 18 1/2 inches (470 millimetres) bore and 20 5/8 inches (524 millimetres) stroke. The total weight of the engine and tender in full working order was 74 long tons (75,190 kilograms) and it had a tractive effort of 16,220 pounds-force (72.2 kilonewtons) at 75% of boiler pressure.

To allow side-play in curves, the axle boxes of the leading and trailing coupled wheels had no inside flanges. Their wheel arrangement, without leading or trailing wheels to lend stability at speed, was more suitable for yard work at slow speeds than for mainline working. According to one report, their utilisation as mainline engines rapidly resulted in the development of excessive side-play to the extent that the tyres eventually cut into the spring hangers.

== Service ==
The locomotives were numbered in the range from 101 to 106 and were placed in service on the Südbahn line from Lüderitzbucht via Seeheim to Kalkfontein, where they formed the mainstay of motive power. Even though the engines were popular with the enginemen, they were not economical in operation. Owing to their light construction, they were allowed to take only three-quarters of their full load.

None of these engines survived the First World War.
