= Indonesian Railways Class E10 =

Indonesian Railways class E10
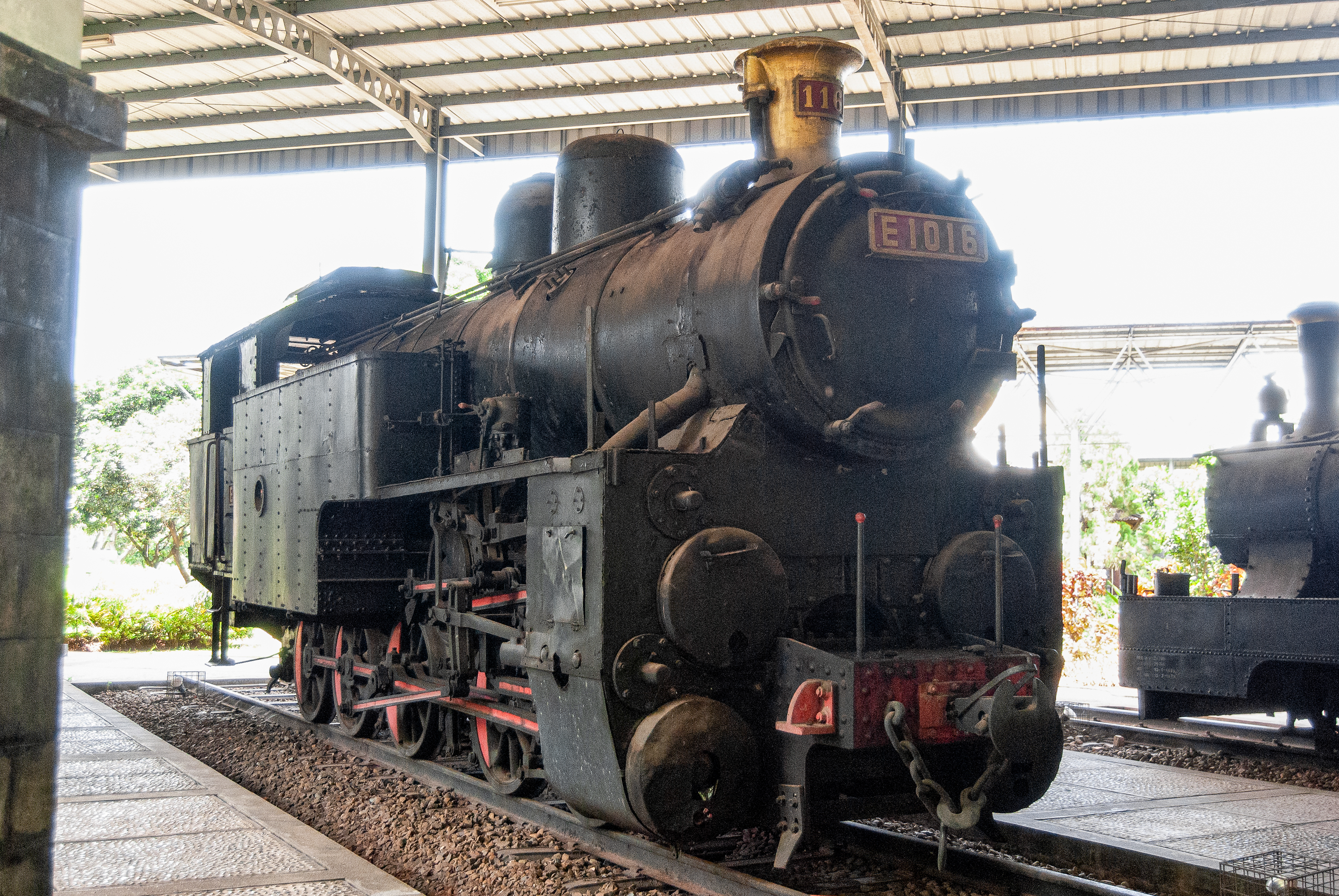
- E1016 at Taman Mini Indonesia Indah (TMII)'s Transportation Museum.
Type and origin
- Power type: Steam
- Builder: Maschinenfabrik Esslingen; Swiss Locomotive and Machine Works; Nippon Sharyo
- Serial number: E10/SSS 100
- Build date: 1922–1928; 1964–1966
- Total produced: 39
Specifications
- Configuration
  - Whyte: 0-10-0RT
  - AAR: E
  - UIC: Et
- Gauge: 1,067 mm (3 ft 6 in)
- Wheel diameter: 1,000 mm (3 ft 3 in)
- Length: 10,224 mm (33 ft 6.5 in)
- Width: 2,506 mm (8 ft 2.7 in)
- Height: 3,500 mm (11 ft 6 in)
- Fuel type: Coal; Wood
- Cylinder size: 450 mm × 520 mm (18 in × 20 in)
Performance figures
- Maximum speed: 50 km/h
- Power output: 750 hp (560 kW)
Career
- Locale: West Sumatra
- Current owner: PT Kereta Api Indonesia

The E10 class are a class of 0-10-0RT steam locomotives built by Maschinenfabrik Esslingen, Swiss Locomotive and Machine Works, and Nippon Sharyo that hauled both passenger and freight trains on the rack railway between Sawahlunto and Padang in West Sumatra. They were nicknamed "Mak Itam", derived from the Minangkabau phrase "black uncle".

These locomotives were capable of hauling coal trains up to 130 tons, and had four cylinders, with two of them being used to drive the rack gears.

== History ==
=== Background and service history ===
To increase coal traffic carried from Ombilin, the Staatsspoorwegen ter Sumatra's Westkust (SSS) decided to replace their older locomotives that could not handle the increasingly heavier trains, so larger locomotives were introduced because they could handle steeper gradients and had greater pulling power, thus allowing longer trains. The first batch of E10s, numbered SSS 104–125, were supplied by Esslingen in Germany, and by the SLM in Switzerland. In total, there were 22 locomotives, with SSS 104–112 and 119–121 being built by the SLM, and the rest by Esslingen. They were delivered in stages in 1921, 1926, and 1928. Another locomotive class that were placed in the SSS 1xx series were three D18 locomotives.

After independence, an additional 17 locomotives forming a second batch of E10s built to similar technical specifications were ordered, thus increasing the amount of E10 locomotives to a total of 39. Ten were built by Esslingen, while in 1967, the remaining seven were manufactured by Nippon Sharyo; they were considered to be the last steam locomotives built by the Japanese manufacturer. Until the mid-1980s, the E10s were used for both passenger and freight trains.

Due to differing technical specifications between the two batches of E10s, the locomotives forming the second batch of E10s were numbered E1051–67, skipping E1026–50 in the numbering sequence.

=== Retirement and preservation ===
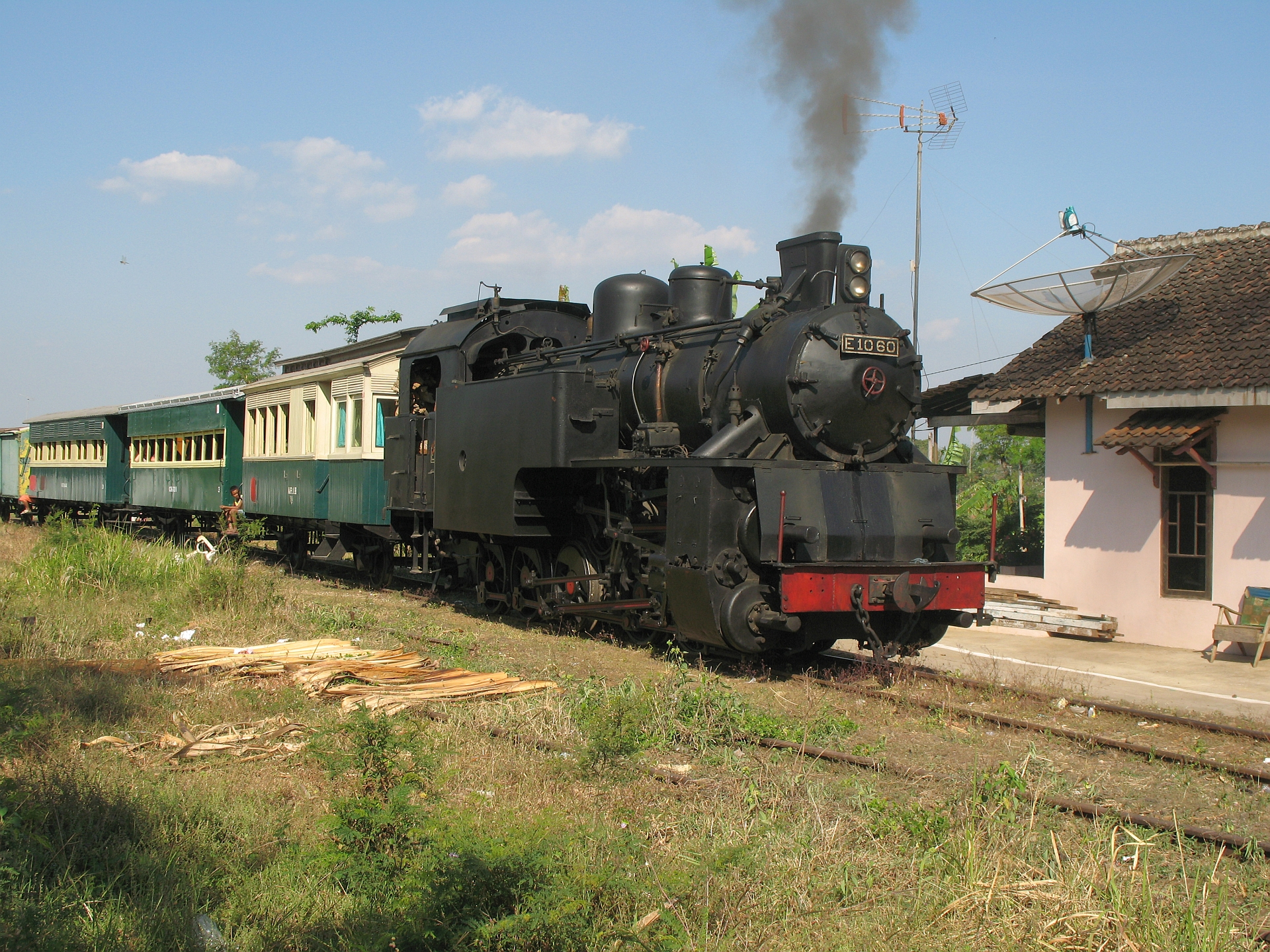
Locomotive E1060 on the Jambu–Ambarawa–Tuntang railway line, 2008

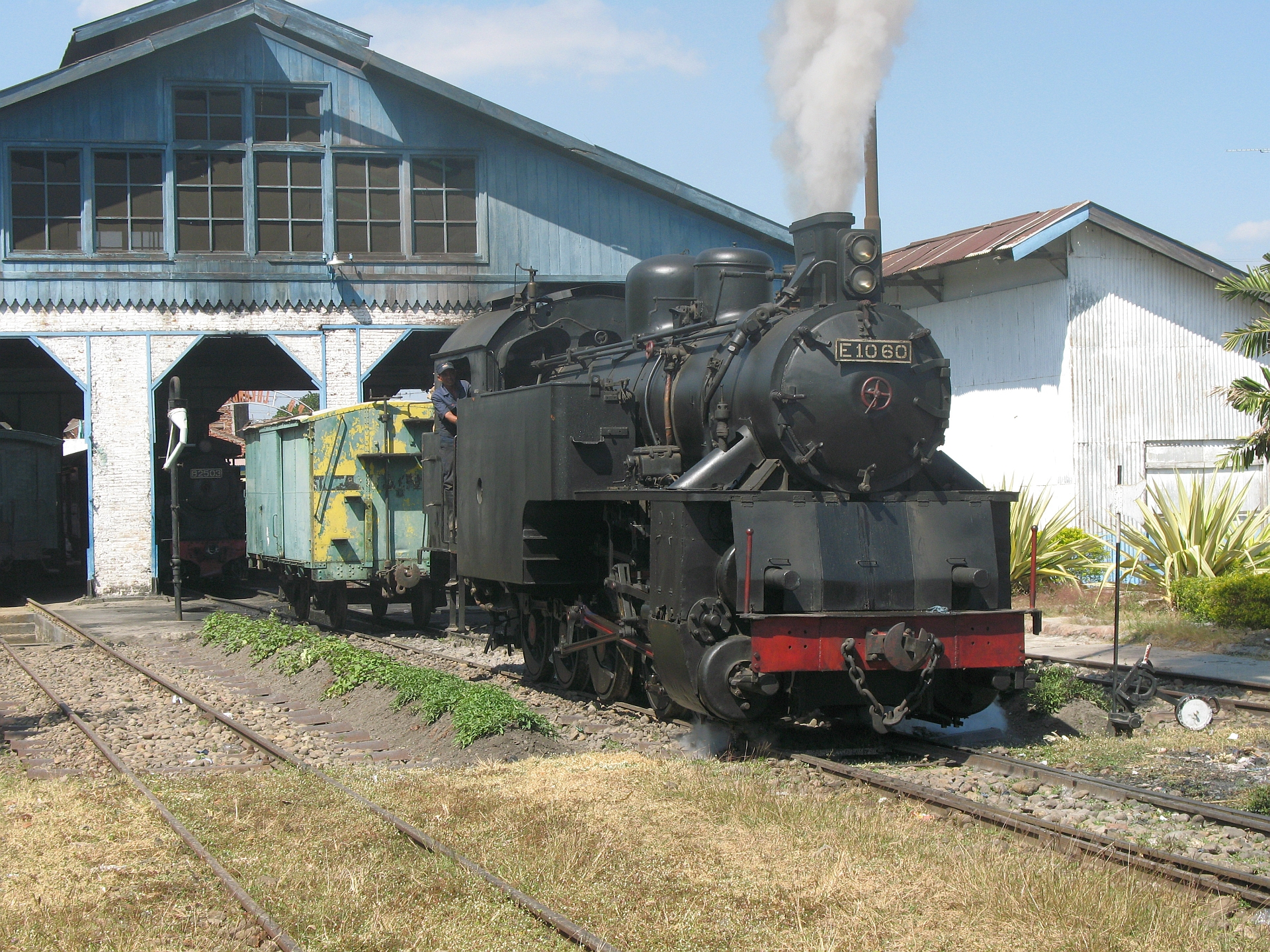
Locomotive E1060 at the Ambarawa Railway Museum depot, 2008

Beginning in 1984, the SLM delivered the BB204 class diesel locomotives to the Perusahaan Jawatan Kereta Api (PJKA), allowing the aging E10 class to be retired. In 1988, an E10, E1060, was taken to the Ambarawa Railway Museum for preservation: while at Ambarawa, E1060's rack gears were found to be incompatible with the Jambu to Bedono rack section of the Ambarawa railway—which was designed for the B25 class, the locomotives that originally ran that railway. Another locomotive, number E1016 from the first batch of E10s, was put on display at the Transportation Museum in Taman Mini Indonesia Indah.

To promote the Sawahlunto Rail and Train Museum that had opened on 17 December 2005, the Sawahlunto City Government requested PT Kereta Api to return E1060 to West Sumatra. The arrangement was completed on 3 December 2007.

On 21 February 2009, the Mak Itam train commenced operations, alongside the Danau Singkarak tourist train. The Mak Itam ran on the Sawahlunto to Muarakalaban section, while the Danau Singkarak ran the Sawahlunto to Padangpanjang section.

During preservation, E1060 was once chartered for the annual Tour de Singkarak 2012 cycling event. For this occasion, the locomotive hauled a train consisting of six passenger carriages, with one cream and green liveried carriage from the Mak Itam, and the five remaining carriages that were usually used for the Danau Singkarak tourist train.

By 2016, E1060 had been rendered inoperable from damage to its water heater pipe. Attempts were made by the Sawahlunto Museum to return the relatively young locomotive into working order by fabricating their own spare parts, as the Esslingen factory had long been closed.

To keep the Mak Itam running on a regular basis, a replica of E1060 was built in September 2018. This replica measured 4 m long, 1.5 m wide, and uses a four-wheel engine from a Toyota Dyna truck. This replica is the first new build steam loco in Indonesia since the 1960s, albelt oil-fired instead of coal fired.

In 2022, E1060 was placed back in operation to haul the Mak Itam tourist train, assisted by a BB303 diesel locomotive stationed in Sawahlunto, in case if E1060 fails. The tourist train fare is approximately 54,000 rupiah per person.

== Gallery ==
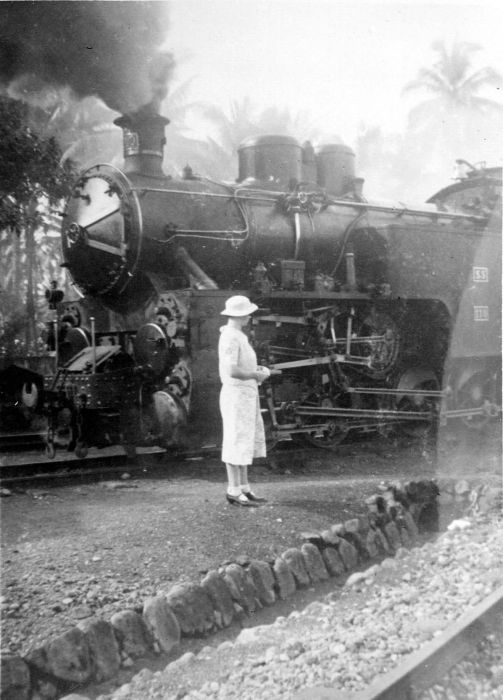
One of the SSS 100 (E10) locomotives in Padang, 1947

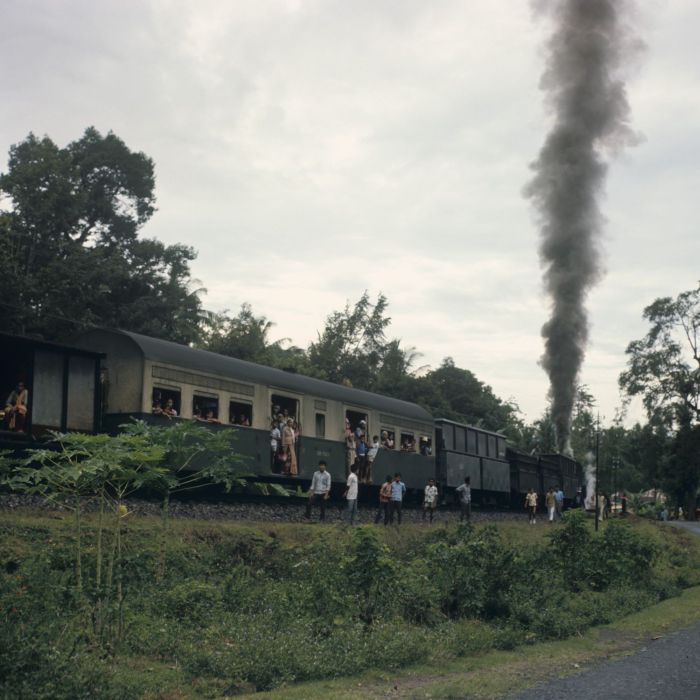
An E10 locomotive on a mixed train pauses in the Bukittinggi-Singkarak area, 1971

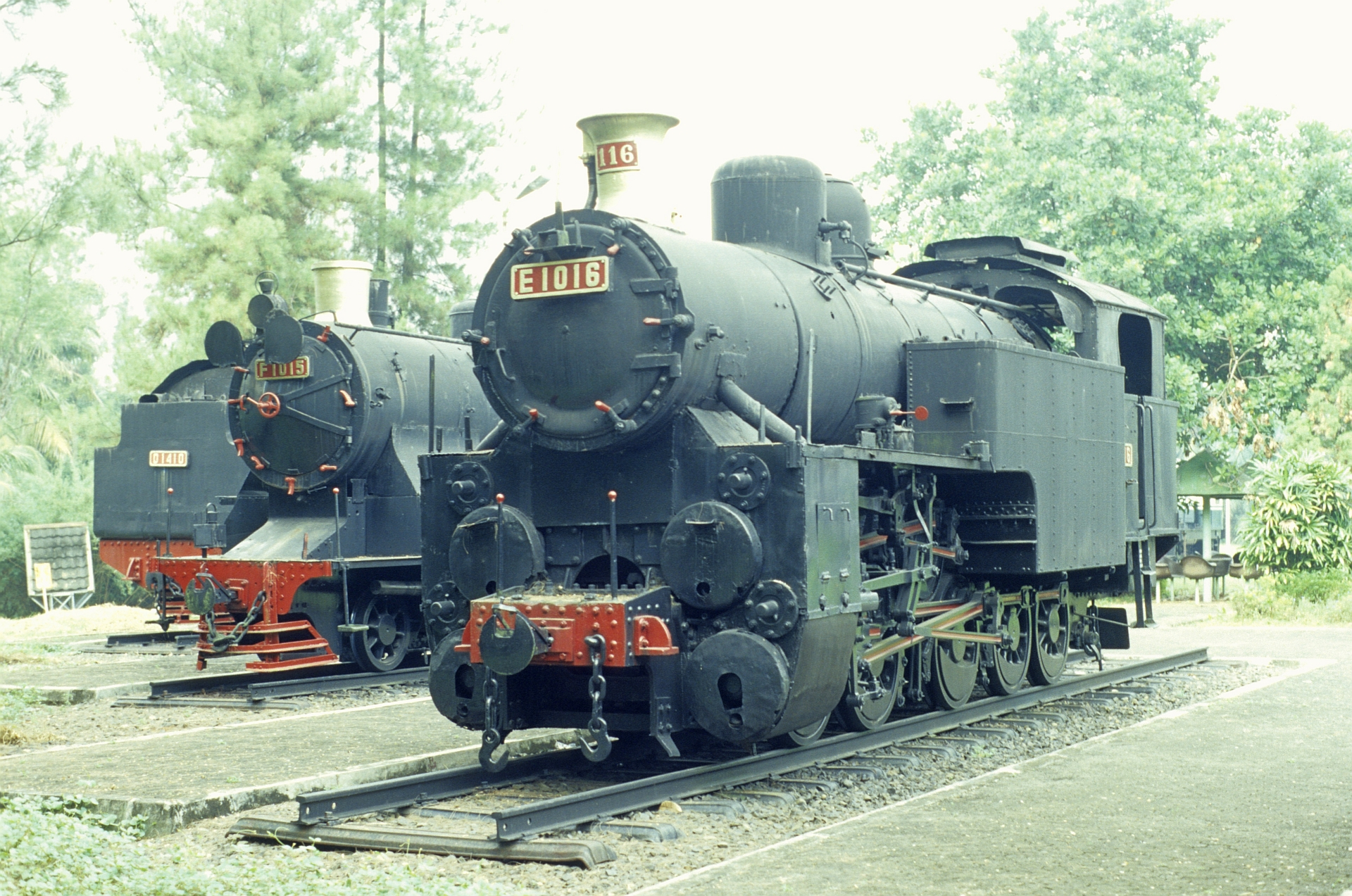
E1016 at the Transportation Museum in Taman Mini Indonesia Indah (TMII), 2002
