= BNR class HSG =

Type and origin
- Power type: Steam
- Builder: Beyer, Peacock & Company
- Serial number: 6261–6262
- Build date: 1925
- Total produced: 2
Specifications
- Configuration
  - Whyte: 2-8-0+0-8-2
- Gauge: 5 ft 6 in (1,676 mm)
- Driver dia.: 4 ft 8 in (1.422 m)
- Axle load: 18.75 long tons (19.05 t)
- Adhesive weight: 148.5 long tons (150.9 t)
- Loco weight: 180.5 long tons (183.4 t)
- Fuel type: Coal
- Fuel capacity: 8 long tons (8.1 t)
- Water cap.: 5,000 imp gal (23,000 L; 6,000 US gal)
- Firebox
  - Grate area: 263 sq ft (24.4 m^{2})
- Boiler pressure: 180 psi (1.24 MPa)
- Heating surface: 2,954 sq ft (274.4 m^{2})
- Superheater
  - Heating area: 642 sq ft (59.6 m^{2})
- Cylinders: Four, outside
- Cylinder size: 20 in × 26 in (508 mm × 660 mm)
Performance figures
- Tractive effort: 56,825 lbf (252.77 kN)
Career
- Operators: Bengal Nagpur Railway; →Indian Railways
- Numbers: BNR: 691–692; →IR: 38681–38692
- Locale: Eastern Railway zone; South Eastern Railway zone
- Last run: 1969
- Withdrawn: 1969
- Scrapped: 1969
- Disposition: Both scrapped

The Bengal Nagpur Railway class HSG was a class of two 2-8-0+0-8-2 Garratt locomotives.

Following the North Western State Railway's GAS class, the Bengal Nagpur Railway conducted similar experiments to haul heavier trains up the ghats with successful results. Their components shared similarities with BESA heavy goods 2-8-0s, specifically class HG. They operated on the Chakradharpur–Jharsuguda section. Following electrification, they became obsolete and were eventually stationed at the Kharagpur workshop. They are noted as the first successful class of Garratt locomotives.

== Technical specifications ==
Specification	Detail
Boiler diameter	7 ft 1 13/16 in (2.18 m)
Maximum train load	2,550 long tons (2,590 t)
