= LNER Class U1 =

British steam locomotive (1925–1955)

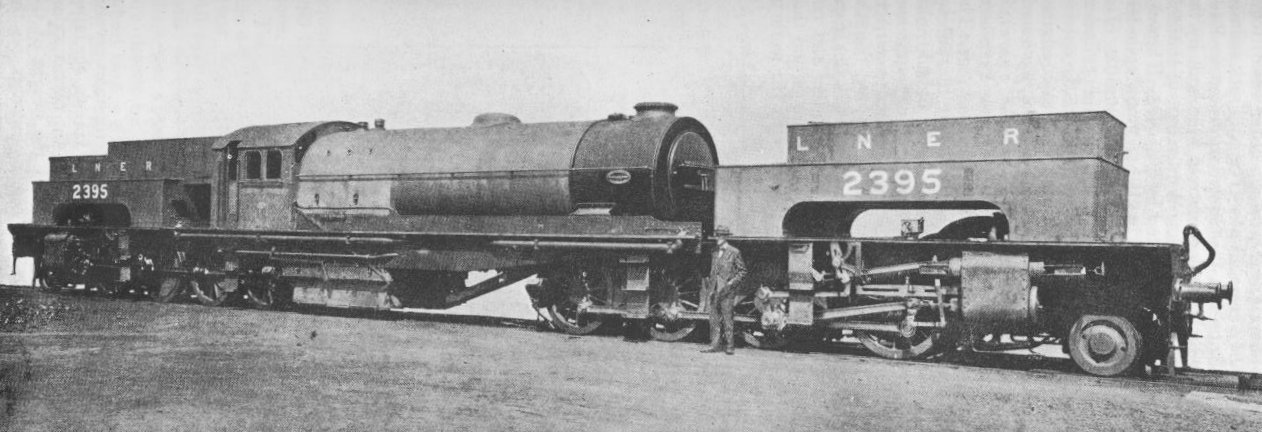
- No. 2395, in photographic grey, in 1925
Type and origin
- Power type: Steam
- Designer: Nigel Gresley
- Builder: Beyer, Peacock and Company
- Serial number: 6209
- Build date: 1925
- Total produced: 1
Specifications
- Configuration
  - Whyte: 2-8-0+0-8-2
  - UIC: 1'D(D1')h6
- Gauge: 4 ft 8 1/2 in (1,435 mm) standard gauge
- Leading dia.: 2 ft 8 in (0.813 m)
- Driver dia.: 4 ft 8 in (1.422 m)
- Length: 87 ft 3 in (26.59 m)
- Loco weight: 178 long tons (181 t; 199 short tons)
- Fuel type: Coal
- Fuel capacity: 7 long tons (7.1 t; 7.8 short tons)
- Water cap.: 5,000 imp gal (23,000 L; 6,000 US gal)
- Firebox
  - Grate area: 56.5 sq ft (5.25 m^{2})
- Boiler pressure: 180 lb/sq in (13 kg/cm^{2}; 1,200 kPa)
- Cylinders: 6 (2 outside and 1 inside at each end)
- Cylinder size: 18 1/2 in × 26 in (470 mm × 660 mm)
- Valve gear: Outside: Walschaerts; Inside: Gresley conjugated
Performance figures
- Tractive effort: 72,940 lbf (324,500 N)
Career
- Operators: London and North Eastern Railway; British Railways
- Class: LNER: U1
- Locale: North Eastern Region
- Retired: 1955
- Disposition: Scrapped

The London and North Eastern Railway Class U1 was a solitary 2-8-0+0-8-2 Garratt locomotive designed for banking coal trains over the Worsborough Bank, (Note: The railway preserved the archaic spelling of 'Worsborough', although the town of Worsbrough has since dropped the 'o'.) a steeply graded line in South Yorkshire and part of the Woodhead Route. It was both the longest and the most powerful steam locomotive ever to run in Britain. It was built in 1925 with the motion at each end being based on an existing 2-8-0 design. The original number was 2395, and it was renumbered 9999 in March 1946, and then 69999 after nationalisation in 1948, although it retained its cab-side plate bearing its original number throughout its life. The locomotive ran for some time as an oil burner, and was tried out on the Lickey Incline in 1949–1950 and again, after the electrification of its home line, in 1955. These trials were unsuccessful, and so the locomotive was withdrawn in 1955 and scrapped.

== Origins ==
The Worsborough Bank, sometimes referred to as the Worsborough Incline, was a steep bank on the Great Central Railway (GCR) freight-only line from Wath to Penistone, climbing for 7 miles (11 km), with a stretch of 3 miles (4.8 km) at a nominal gradient of 1 in 40 (2.5%). Sections of this incline also suffered from colliery subsidence, making it infamously difficult to restart a stalled train on these severe sections. The main traffic on the line was loaded trains carrying coal from the South Yorkshire coalfields to Lancashire. The GCR had considered several options for banking these heavy trains, including one based on a design by Kitson and Company for a locomotive carrying out similar duties in Ceylon (now Sri Lanka). This idea had been discarded due to the restricted loading gauge, and thought had turned to an articulated Garratt locomotive based on two GCR 8K 2-8-0s (LNER Class O4) with a specially designed large boiler. However, no move had been made to build such a locomotive by the time the GCR was absorbed into the LNER in the 1923 grouping, and responsibility for locomotive design passed to the Chief Mechanical Engineer of the newly formed railway, Nigel Gresley.

The design proposed by Nigel Gresley for a locomotive to bank heavy coal trains up the Worsborough bank was for a 2-8-0+0-8-2 Garratt locomotive based on two GNR O2 2-8-0s. Beyer, Peacock and Company of Manchester tendered £21,000 for the construction of two such locomotives, although the order was subsequently amended to just a single loco which was delivered in summer 1925 at a cost of £14,895. The loco, works number 6209, took just three weeks from laying the frames to completion and was hurriedly sent, still in workshop grey, to appear in the centenary celebration of the Stockton & Darlington Railway where it was exhibit number 42. It was then finished in LNER black livery and was officially accepted into LNER stock in August 1925.

== Operation ==
The U1, numbered 2395, was initially allocated to Barnsley shed but due to the restricted layout there was transferred to Mexborough on 17 October 1925. The locomotive was used to bank heavy trains up the Worsborough Bank, making up to 18 return trips each day; a typical train consisted of an LNER Class O4 locomotive with 60+ loaded coal wagons then an assisting engine at the rear, usually another O4 or an Ex-GCR Class 1B, and finally the U1. The U1 was attached at Wentworth Junction at the bottom of the bank, and pushed for the 3 1/2 miles (5.6 km) to West Silkstone Junction at the top where it would be detached, while the assisting engine would normally continue as far as Dunford Bridge. Prior to the introduction of the U1 a further two O4 locos would have been used for this work although the additional effort required to operate such a large locomotive as the U1 was not appreciated by the crew; "Twice the work but the same sodding pay" summing up their opinion.

With its large size and 79 ft 1 in (24.10 m) wheelbase, the U1 rode well and a spacious cab was provided. However this did not help when passing the two Silkstone tunnels just before the top of the Worsborough Bank. Being the last of three steam locos to enter the tunnel, the footplate conditions with heat, steam and smoke were "close to hell". To overcome this, gas masks were provided for the crew connected via a pipe to a vent at rail level, but the crews objected to sharing these for reasons of hygiene and continued to simply cover their mouths and noses with a wet handkerchief.

The locomotive itself was adequate but not successful enough for further development, and drawings for a revolving coal bunker made by Beyer, Peacock in 1930 were not pursued. Indeed, the design did have some expensive flaws; soft water resulted in the boiler being retubed in 1926, firebox damage was diagnosed in 1927 and 1928, and the loco was out of service for nine months during 1930 during which time some modifications were carried out and a new firebox fitted. After this the loco itself settled down to working its regular beat up and down Worsborough Bank, despite continued steaming problems and a definite susceptibility to poor quality coal. It was renumbered 9999 in the LNER renumbering scheme of 1946, and became 69999 on the creation of British Railways in 1948.

== Later life ==
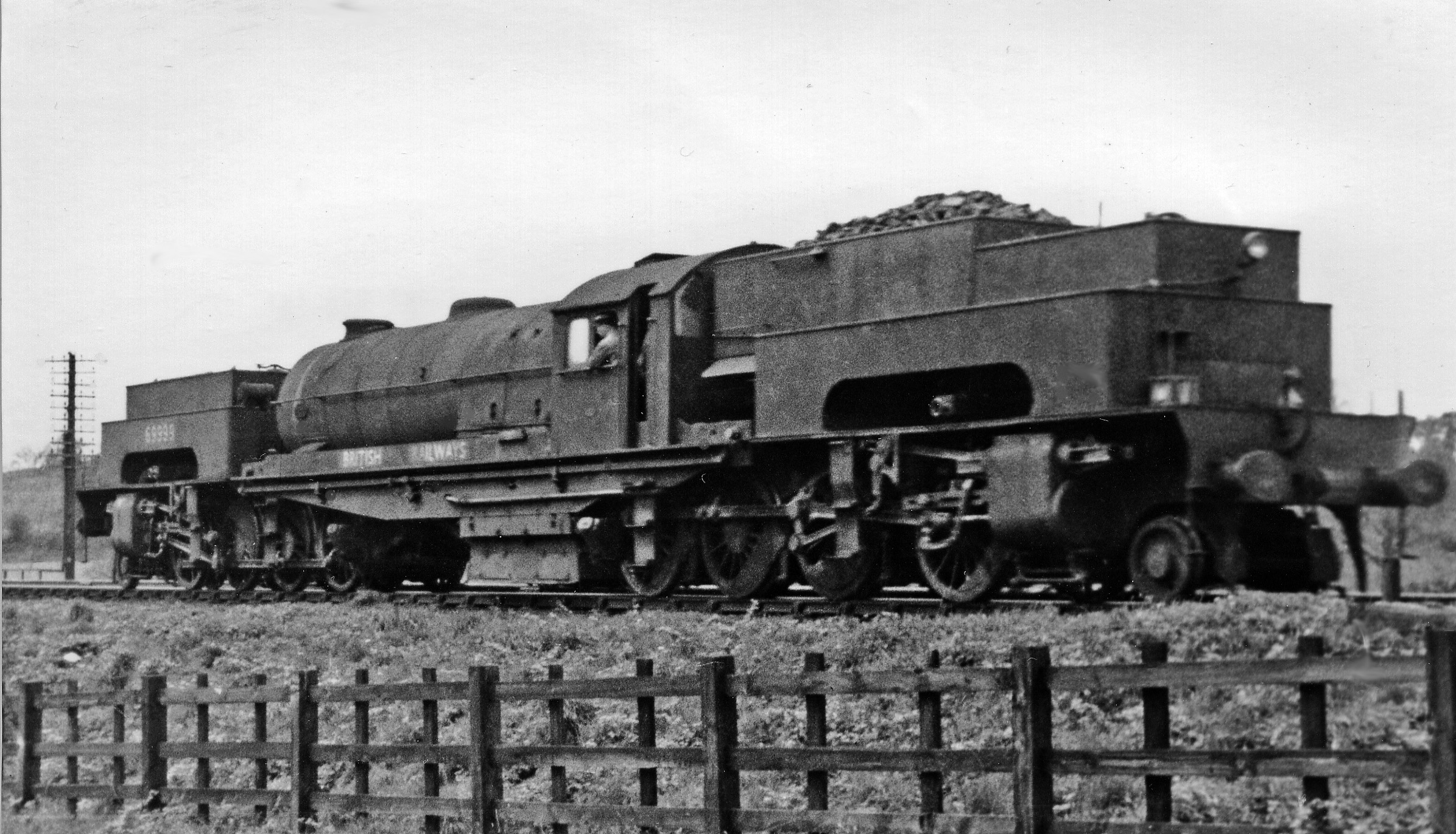
No. 69999 on the Lickey Incline 1949

With the electrification of the Woodhead route and the Worsborough Bank using 1500 V DC overhead catenary, and the boiler considered to be nearing the end of its useful life, the continued operation of the U1 was in some doubt in the late 1940s, but in 1949 it was decided to try the U1 on the Lickey Incline on the Ex-LMS Bristol-Birmingham route to supplement the existing 0-10-0 banker nicknamed "Big Bertha". Initially it worked chimney-first, but after difficulty in buffering up to passenger trains, it was turned to run cab-first up the bank and an electric headlight was fitted. Despite this the crew had great problems with visibility from the cab, particularly after dark, and the U1 returned to Mexborough in November 1950 and was officially placed in storage there.

In February 1951, the U1 was again banking on the Worsborough Bank and continued doing so into 1952 then was briefly placed in store before being sent to Gorton Locomotive Works for work in preparation for a return to the Lickey Incline. It stayed at Gorton for three years while several different attempts were made to convert it to oil burning and an improved electric headlight was also fitted. In June 1955, it resumed work on the Lickey Incline, but was stored at Bromsgrove on 13 September and returned to Gorton the following month. It was officially withdrawn on 23 December 1955, and was subsequently taken to Doncaster Works and cut up during early 1956, having travelled around 425,000 miles (684,000 km) during its 30 years.

== See also ==
- LMS Garratt, a contemporary class of British Garratt locomotives
