= MR 0-10-0 Lickey Banker =

British steam locomotive (1919–1956)

Midland Railway Lickey Banker ‘Big Bertha’
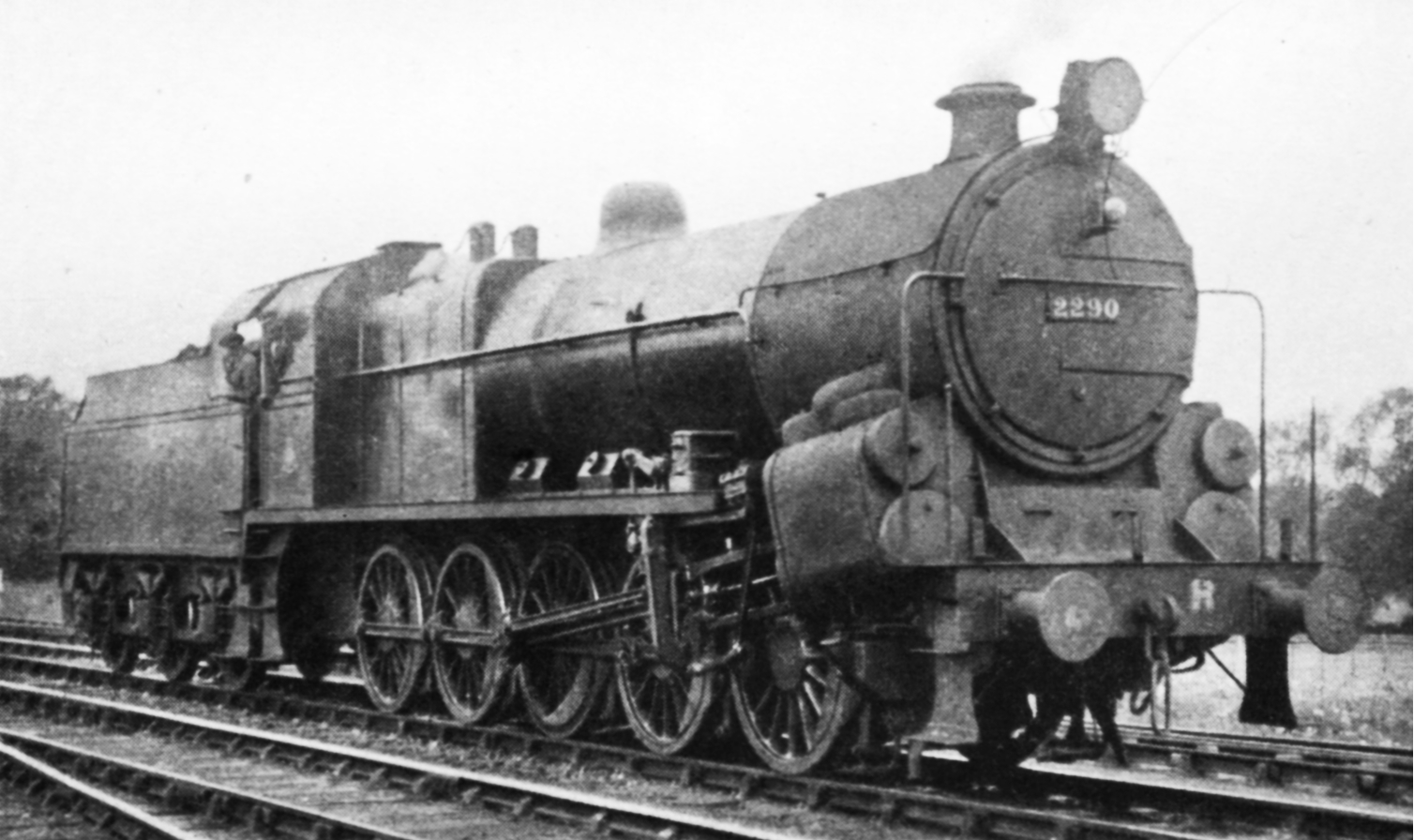
Type and origin
- Power type: Steam
- Designer: James Anderson
- Builder: MR Derby Works
- Build date: 1919
- Total produced: 1
Specifications
- Configuration
  - Whyte: 0-10-0
  - UIC: E h4
- Gauge: 4 ft 8 1/2 in (1,435 mm) standard gauge
- Driver dia.: 4 ft 7 1/2 in (1,410 mm)
- Loco weight: 73 long tons 13 cwt (165,000 lb or 74.8 t)
- Tender weight: 31 long tons 7 cwt (70,200 lb or 31.9 t)
- Total weight: 105 long tons 0 cwt (235,200 lb or 106.7 t)
- Boiler pressure: 180 lbf/in^{2} (1.24 MPa)
- Cylinders: Four
- Cylinder size: 16 3/4 in × 28 in (425 mm × 711 mm)
- Valve gear: Walschaerts
- Valve type: Outside cylinders: Piston valves, Inside cylinders: via crossover ports
Performance figures
- Tractive effort: 43,313 lbf (192.7 kN)
Career
- Operators: Midland Railway; → London, Midland and Scottish Railway; → British Railways
- Numbers: MR: 2290; LMS 2290, 22290; BR: 58100
- Nicknames: Big Bertha, Big Emma
- Locale: Lickey Incline
- Withdrawn: May 1956
- Disposition: Scrapped

In 1919, the Midland Railway built a single one-off 0-10-0 steam locomotive, No 2290 (later LMS (1947) 22290 and BR 58100). It was designed by James Anderson for banking duties on the Lickey Incline in Worcestershire (south of Birmingham), England. It became known as "Big Bertha" or "Big Emma" by railwaymen and railway enthusiasts.

== Banking on the Lickey Incline ==
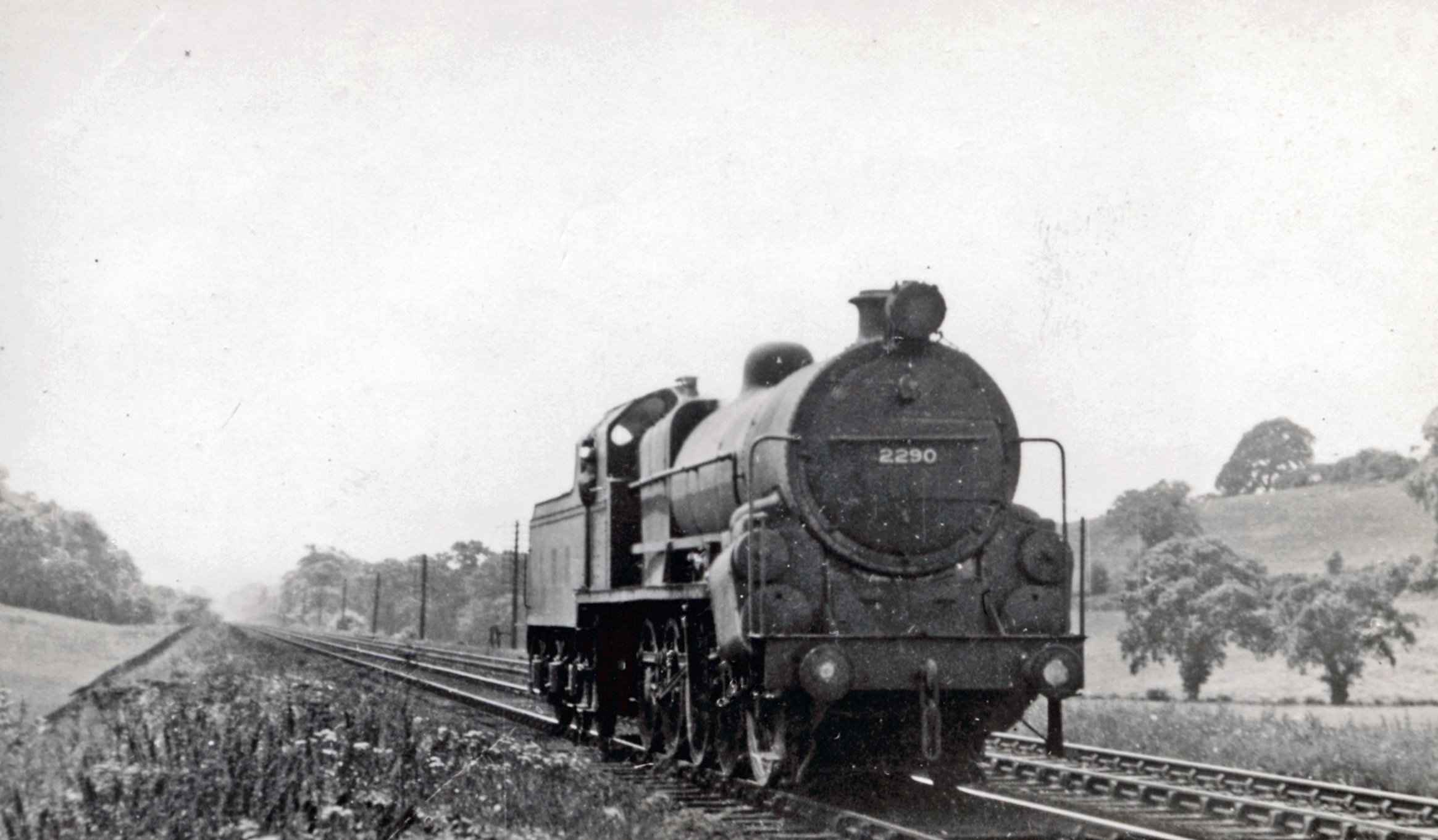
2290 descending the Lickey Incline, 1947

The Lickey Incline is the steepest sustained main-line railway incline in Great Britain. The function of a banker is to provide extra power on steep inclines by being added to the rear of other trains. Bankers were also used to protect against wagons or coaches breaking away, in which case they might run in front of a train going downhill. They largely went out of use with the introduction of advanced braking systems and diesel and electric locomotives, although banking on the Lickey Incline continues as of 2024 using a pool of specialised Class 66 diesel-electric locomotives.

== Numbering ==
No 2290 was built at the Derby Works of the Midland Railway in 1919 and was in use up to the year 1956 by the LMS and British Railways. It was numbered 2290 from new and kept this number through most of its LMS life, but was renumbered to 22290 in 1947 to make room for the numbering of a Fairburn 2-6-4T. Only a year later it was renumbered to 58100 by BR, since adding 40000 to its number (as was done with the majority of LMS engines) would have put it in the 6XXXX ex-LNER series.

== Specification ==
Big Bertha's cylinder arrangement was unusual. There were four cylinders but only two sets of piston valves because there was insufficient space under the smokebox to fit piston valves for the inside cylinders. Instead, the large outside piston valves (as well as supplying the outside cylinders) supplied the inside cylinders through cross-over steam ports. The steam-flow characteristics would have been poor (because of the length of the ports) but this would not have mattered in an engine that ran only at slow speed. It has been suggested that this design has been influenced by the four-cylinder cross-ported arrangement of the Italian 0-10-0 FS Class 470 heavy freight locomotive (in which this was motivated by its being part of an asymmetrical compound design), of which a complete set of drawings were stored at Derby.

With a weight of 105 long tons (107 t) and ten 4 ft 7 1/2 in (1.410 m) diameter driving wheels, Bertha had a tractive effort of 43,300 lbf (193 kN). It, the LMS Garratts, and the LNER Class U1 Garratt were the only locomotives not given a power classification by either the LMS or BR, either because the bankers were designed specifically for the job of providing extra power at slow speeds and were not suitable for normal train working, or because their starting tractive effort fell outside the system and it was not worth extending it for so few machines.

== Withdrawal ==
The engine was withdrawn on 19 May 1956 and scrapped by Derby Works in September 1957, having covered 838,856 miles (1,350,008 km), mostly on the Lickey. BR Standard Class 9F number 92079 took over, acquiring Big Bertha's electric headlight for the duty. The other banking turns on the Lickey were operated by Midland Railway 2441 Class, LMS Fowler Class 3F 0-6-0Ts, and GWR 9400 Class pannier tanks often in pairs, operation being controlled by a complicated system of whistle codes.

== See also ==
- The LNER Class U1 Beyer-Garratt banker from the Woodhead Route was tried unsuccessfully on the Lickey in the mid-1950s.
- Several GWR 9400 Class pannier tank engines were used for banking after the Lickey Incline came under the control of the Western Region, along with BR Standard Class 9F number 92079, which ended up inheriting her headlamp.

== Bibliography ==
- Casserley, H. C.; Johnston, Stuart W. (1974) [1966]. Locomotives at the Grouping 3: London Midland and Scottish. Shepperton, Surrey: Ian Allan. ISBN 0-7110-0554-0.
- Maggs, Colin G. (2013) [1986]. The Birmingham to Gloucester Line (2 ed.). Stroud, United Kingdom: Amberley. ISBN 9781445606996. OCLC 855200150.
