= DB Class 82 =

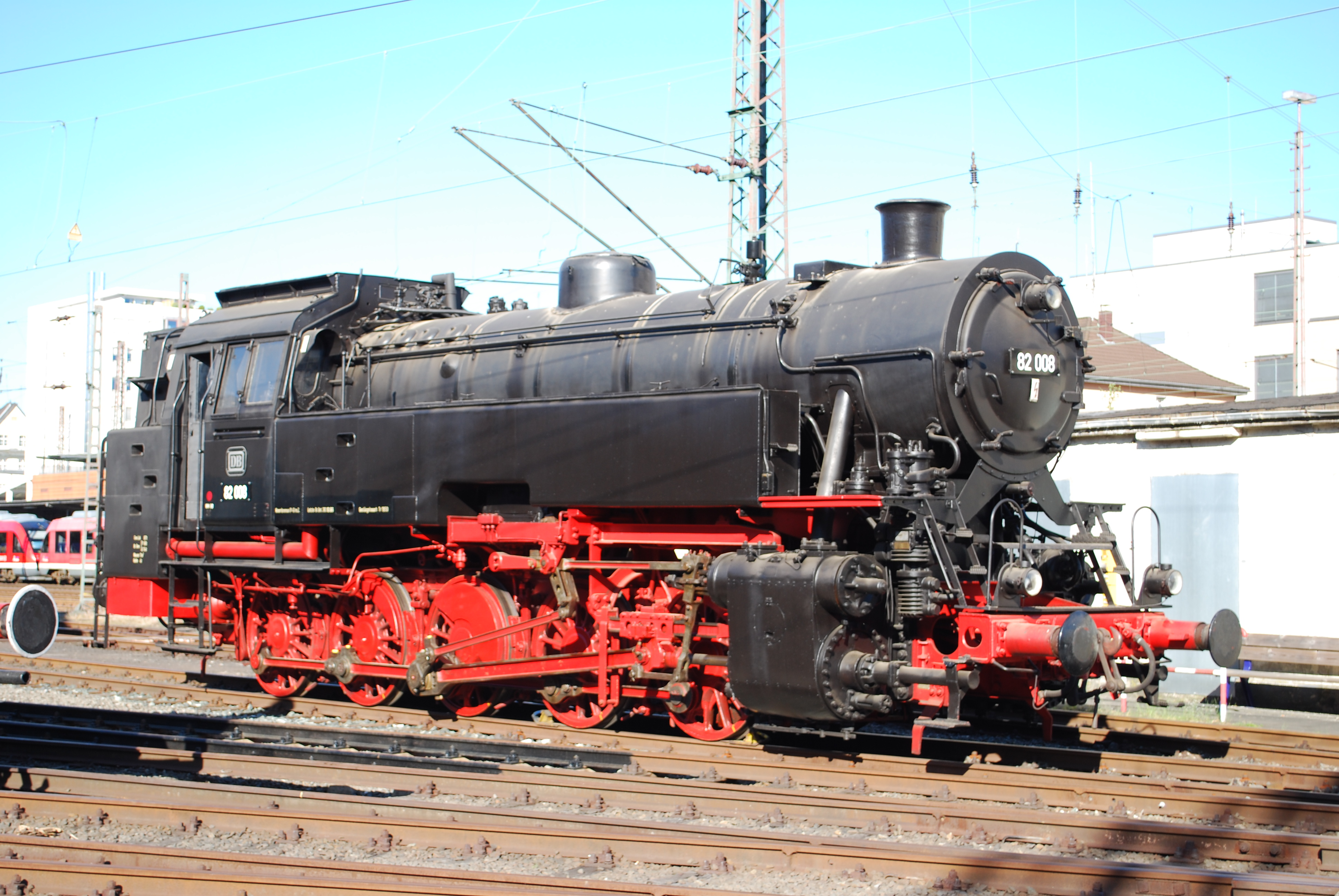
- 82 008 at Siegen Depot Museum, June 2011.
Type and origin
- Power type: Steam
- Builder: Krupp (22); Henschel & Sohn (10); Maschinenfabrik Esslingen (9)
- Build date: 1950–1955
- Total produced: 41
Specifications
- Configuration
  - Whyte: 0-10-0T
  - UIC: E h2t
  - German: Gt 55.18
- Gauge: 1,435 mm (4 ft 8 1/2 in)
- Driver dia.: 1,400 mm (4 ft 7 1/8 in)
- Wheelbase
  - Axle spacing (Asymmetrical): 1,650 mm (5 ft 5 in) +; 1,650 mm (5 ft 5 in) +; 1,650 mm (5 ft 5 in) +; 1,650 mm (5 ft 5 in) =
  - Engine: 6,600 mm (21 ft 7 7/8 in)
- Length
  - Over headstocks: 12,760 mm (41 ft 10 3/8 in)
  - Over buffers: 14,060 mm (46 ft 1 1/2 in)
- Height: 4,550 mm (14 ft 11 1/8 in)
- Axle load: 18.4 t (18.1 long tons; 20.3 short tons)
- Adhesive weight: 91.8 t (90.4 long tons; 101.2 short tons)
- Empty weight: 69.7 t (68.6 long tons; 76.8 short tons)
- Service weight: 91.8 t (90.4 long tons; 101.2 short tons)
- Fuel type: Coal
- Fuel capacity: 4.0 t (3.9 long tons; 4.4 short tons)
- Water cap.: 11 m^{3} (2,420 imp gal; 2,910 US gal)
- Firebox
  - Grate area: 2.35 m^{2} (25.3 sq ft)
- Boiler
  - Pitch: 3,100 mm (10 ft 2 in)
  - Tube plates: 4,000 mm (13 ft 1 1/2 in)
  - Small tubes: 44.5 mm (1 3/4 in), 115 off
  - Large tubes: 118 mm (4 5/8 in), 38 off
- Boiler pressure: 14 bar (14.3 kgf/cm^{2}; 203 psi)
- Heating surface
  - Firebox: 12.60 m^{2} (135.6 sq ft)
  - Tubes: 57.08 m^{2} (614.4 sq ft)
  - Flues: 52.53 m^{2} (565.4 sq ft)
  - Total surface: 122.21 m^{2} (1,315.5 sq ft)
- Superheater
  - Heating area: 51.90 m^{2} (558.6 sq ft)
- Cylinders: Two, outside
- Cylinder size: 600 mm × 660 mm (23 5/8 in × 26 in)
- Valve gear: Heusinger (Walschaerts)
- Auxiliary brake: 82 038 – 82 041 fitted with counterpressure brake
Performance figures
- Maximum speed: 70 km/h (43 mph)
- Indicated power: 1,290 PS (949 kW; 1,270 hp)
Career
- Operators: Deutsche Bundesbahn
- Numbers: 82 001 – 82 041
- Retired: 1972

The DB Class 82 was a goods train tank locomotive with the Deutsche Bundesbahn in Germany, that was built in the period after the Second World War and was intended for shunting and normal rail services. They were to replace the ten-coupled state railway (Länderbahn) engines and also the accident-prone Class 87 DRG Einheitslok (standard locomotive).

It was the first of the DB's so-called Neubaudampflokomotiven or newly designed steam locomotives, and was built by the firms of Krupp and Henschel in 1950 and 1951 and also by the Maschinenfabrik Esslingen in 1955. Although they were ten-couplers, the 41 engines were also suitable for lines with tight curves such as the Hamburg Harbour railway. To improve curve running the first and last axles were fitted with Beugniot levers. The last two examples were also equipped with Riggenbach counterpressure brakes, which enabled their operation on steep lines. The locomotives were able to haul 800 tonne trains at up to 70 km/h.

== Deployment ==
The engines were predominantly employed in the marshalling yards at Bremen and Hamm as well as on the harbour lines of Emden and Hamburg. The 82s could also be seen pulling mainline trains up the steep inclines of the Westerwald and in the Black Forest on the Murg Valley Railway.

Retirement began as early as 1966, the final locomotive depot being Bw Koblenz-Mosel, where the last one was withdrawn in 1972.

== Preserved ==
Locomotive 82 008, the last of class withdrawn, has been maintained at Bw Neumünster since early 2003 by the Rendsburger Eisenbahnfreunden.

== See also ==
- List of DB locomotives and railbuses
