= DRG Class 87 =

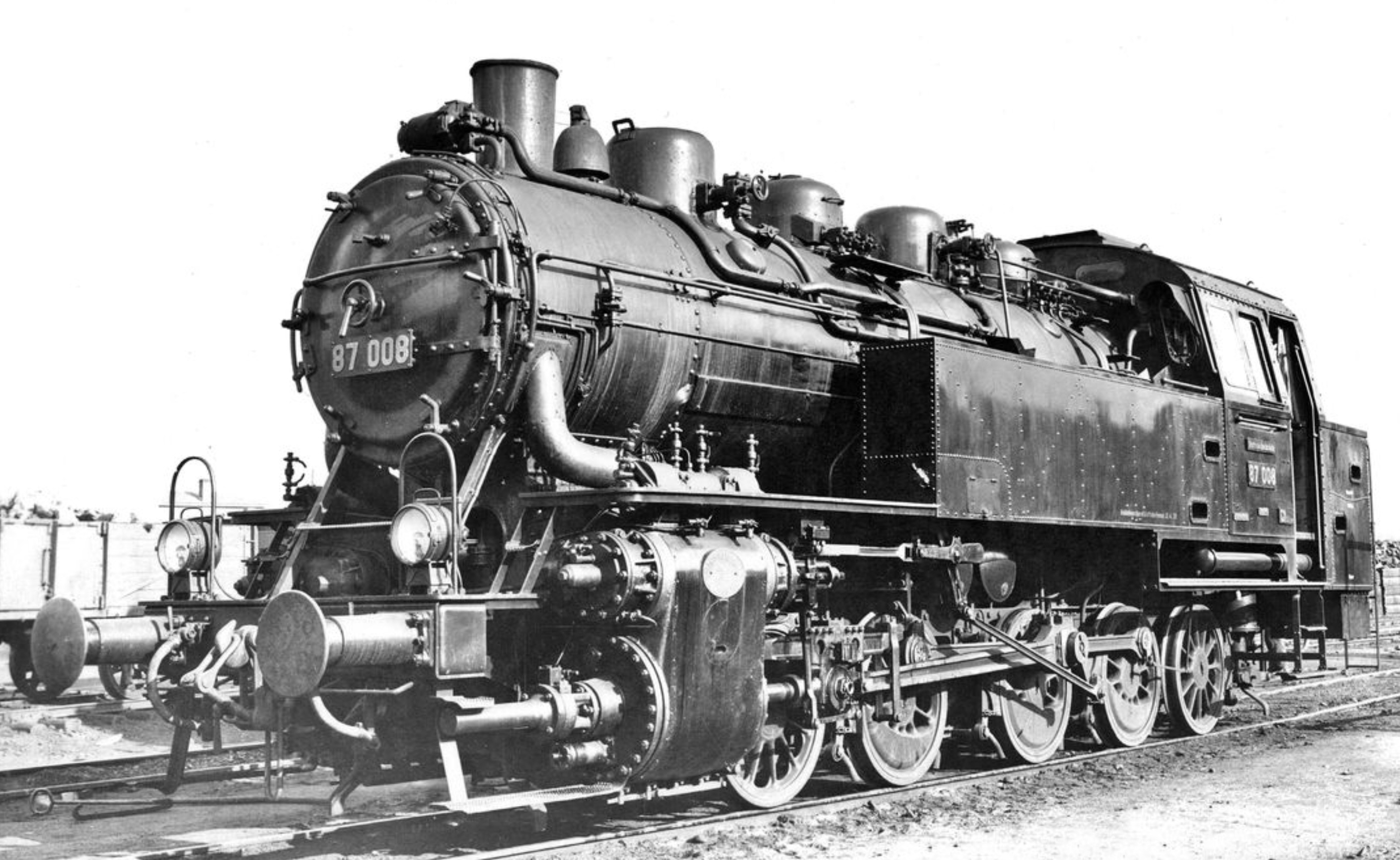
- 87 008
Type and origin
- Power type: Steam
- Builder: Orenstein & Koppel
- Serial number: 11231–11238, 11411–11415, 11551–11553
- Build date: 1927–1928
- Total produced: 16
Specifications
- Configuration
  - Whyte: 0-10-0T
  - UIC: E h2t
  - German: Gt 55.17
- Gauge: 1,435 mm (4 ft 8 1/2 in)
- Driver dia.: 1,100 mm (3 ft 7 1/4 in)
- Wheelbase
  - Axle spacing (Asymmetrical): 1,400 mm (4 ft 7 1/8 in) +; 1,800 mm (5 ft 10 7/8 in) +; 1,600 mm (5 ft 3 in) +; 1,400 mm (4 ft 7 1/8 in) =
  - Engine: 6,200 mm (20 ft 4 1/8 in)
- Length
  - Over headstocks: 12,000 mm (39 ft 4 1/2 in)
  - Over buffers: 13,300 mm (43 ft 7 5/8 in)
- Height: 4,165 mm (13 ft 8 in)
- Axle load: 17.1 t (16.8 long tons; 18.8 short tons)
- Adhesive weight: 85.6 t (84.2 long tons; 94.4 short tons)
- Empty weight: 68.0 t (66.9 long tons; 75.0 short tons)
- Service weight: 85.6 t (84.2 long tons; 94.4 short tons)
- Fuel type: Coal
- Fuel capacity: 3.0 t (3.0 long tons; 3.3 short tons)
- Water cap.: 9 m^{3} (1,980 imp gal; 2,380 US gal)
- Firebox
  - Grate area: 2.34 m^{2} (25.2 sq ft)
- Boiler
  - Pitch: 2,700 mm (8 ft 10 1/4 in)
  - Tube plates: 4,500 mm (14 ft 9 1/8 in)
  - Small tubes: 44.5 mm (1 3/4 in), 110 off
  - Large tubes: 133 mm (5 1/4 in), 26 off
- Boiler pressure: 14 bar (14.3 kgf/cm^{2}; 203 psi)
- Heating surface
  - Firebox: 10.0 m^{2} (108 sq ft)
  - Tubes: 61.4 m^{2} (661 sq ft)
  - Flues: 45.9 m^{2} (494 sq ft)
  - Total surface: 117.3 m^{2} (1,263 sq ft)
- Superheater
  - Heating area: 47.0 m^{2} (506 sq ft)
- Cylinders: Two, outside
- Cylinder size: 600 mm × 550 mm (23 5/8 in × 21 5/8 in)
Performance figures
- Maximum speed: 45 km/h (28 mph)
- Indicated power: 940 PS (691 kW; 927 hp)
Career
- Operators: Deutsche Reichsbahn; → Deutsche Bundesbahn
- Numbers: 87 001 – 87 016
- Retired: 1951–1956

The German Class 87 was a standard (see Einheitsdampflokomotive) goods train tank locomotive with the Deutsche Reichsbahn-Gesellschaft (DRG). It was specifically designed by the firm of Orenstein & Koppel for use in Hamburg Harbour. The harbour lines had minimal curve radii of only 100 metres (330 ft) and high train loads to be moved. The axle load had to be no more than 17.5 tonnes (17.2 long tons; 19.3 short tons). These requirements resulted in an axle count of five axles. In order to keep wear and tear on the running gear within acceptable limits only the middle three wheelsets were linked by coupling rods, the two Luttermöller outside axles were driven by cogs.

Due to damage the vehicles were partly also operated as 1′D, D1′ or 1′C1′ engines.

From 1951 they were superseded by DB Class 82 locomotives.

== See also ==
- List of DRG locomotives and railbuses
