= 0-10-0 =

Locomotive wheel arrangement

0-10-0 (Ten-coupled)

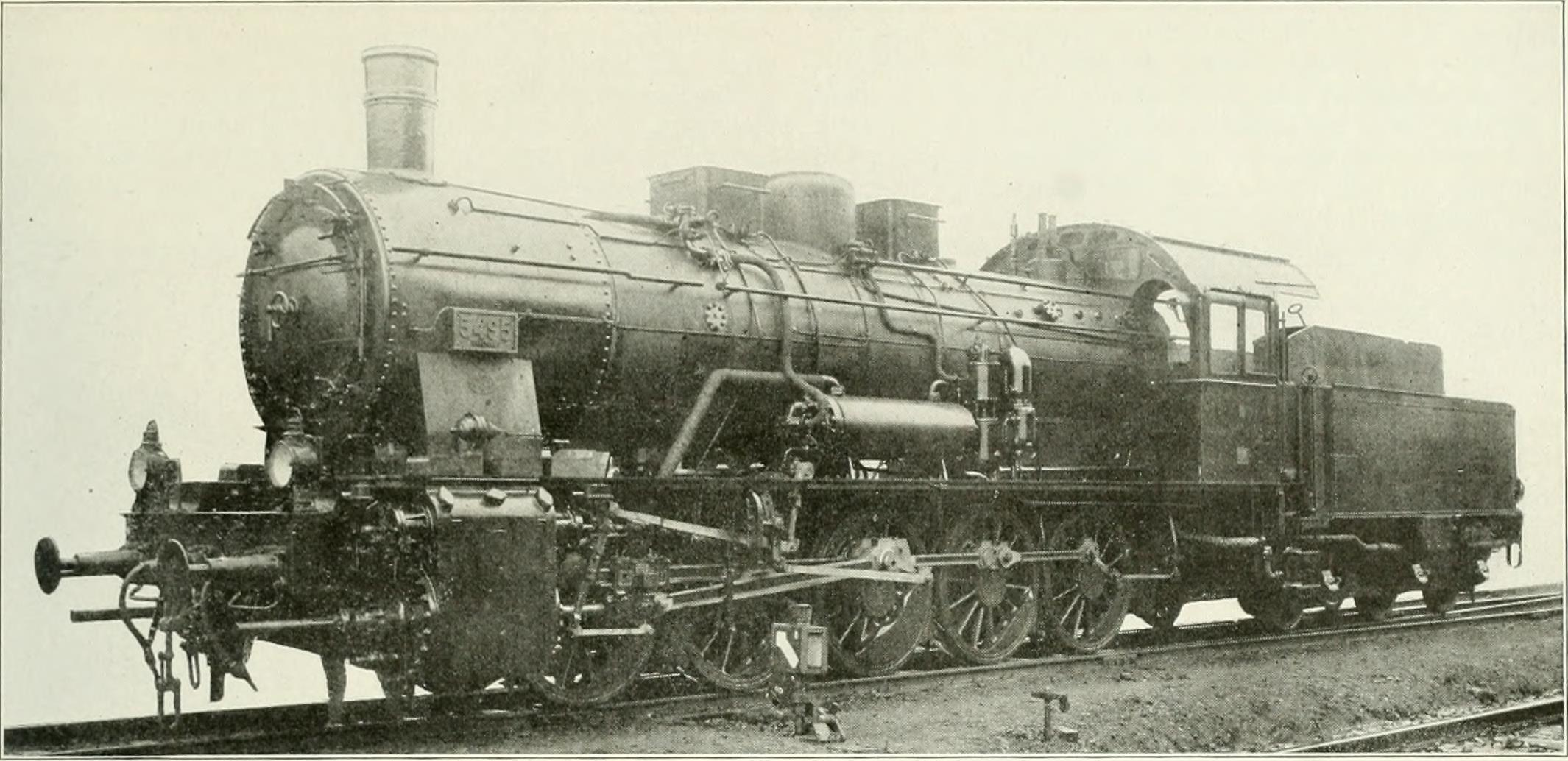
- Builder's photo of a Prussian G 10 in 1916
Equivalent classifications
- UIC class: E
- French class: 050
- Turkish class: 55
- Swiss class: 5/5
- Russian class: 0-5-0
First known tank engine version
- First use: 1868
- Country: United States of America
- Locomotive: Reuben Wells
- Railway: Jeffersonville, Madison and Indianapolis Railroad
- Designer: Reuben Wells
- Benefits: Total locomotive mass as adhesive weight
- Drawbacks: Instability at speed
First known tender engine version
- First use: 1899
- Country: Austria
- Locomotive: 180.00 class
- Railway: Imperial Royal Austrian State Railways
- Designer: Karl Gölsdorf
- Drawbacks: Instability at speed

Under the Whyte notation for the classification of steam locomotives, 0-10-0 represents the wheel arrangement of no leading wheels, ten powered and coupled driving wheels on five axles and no trailing wheels. In the United Kingdom, this type is known as a Decapod, a name which is applied to 2-10-0 types in the United States. In the United States, the type is known as ten-coupled.

== Overview ==
The lack of leading and trailing wheels makes this wheel arrangement unstable at speed, and it is a type usually confined to fairly low-speed work, such as switching (shunting), transfer runs, slow-speed drag freight, or running over mountainous terrain.

The Russian E class 0-10-0 was the most numerous single class of locomotive in the world, with around 11,000 manufactured.

== Usage ==
=== Austria ===
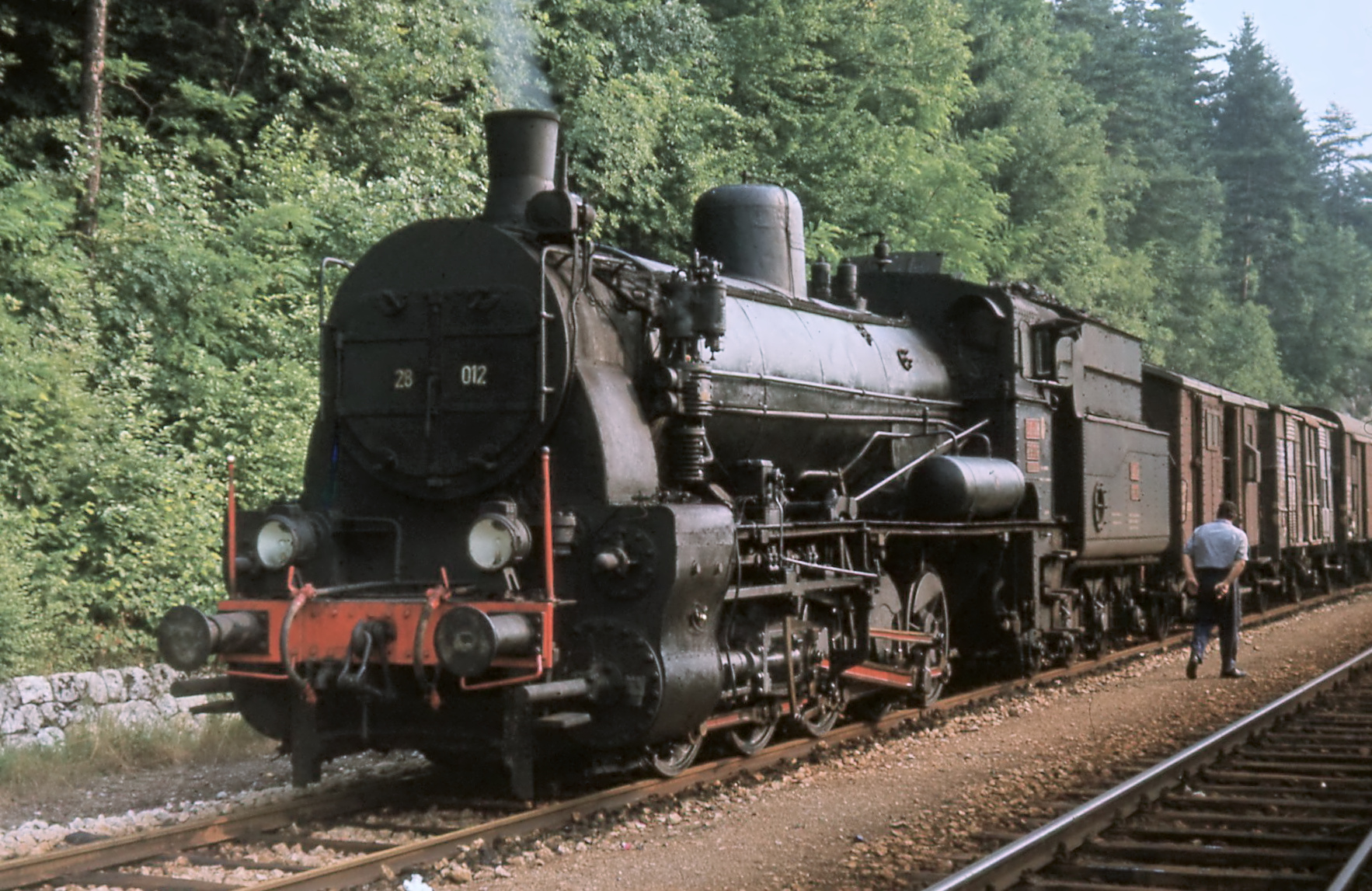
A Gölsdorf 0-10-0 at work in Slovenia, Bled Jezero station, 1971

In 1899, Karl Gölsdorf introduced his famous 180.00 class for the Austrian State Railway, an 0-10-0 for mountain regions which had a remarkably low axle load. It employed the Gölsdorf axle system and had the drive, unusually, on the fourth axle. The class existed both as simple expansion and as two-cylinder compound engines, and they later worked in Yugoslavia, Czechoslovakia, Romania and France.

=== Canada ===
Three 0-10-0 locomotives were owned by the Canadian Pacific Railway.

=== China ===
Sixteen 600 mm (1 ft 11 5/8 in) narrow gauge 0-10-0 locomotives, built by Baldwin Locomotive Works from 1924 to 1929, remained operational on the Yunnan-Kopei Railway until 1990.

=== Finland ===
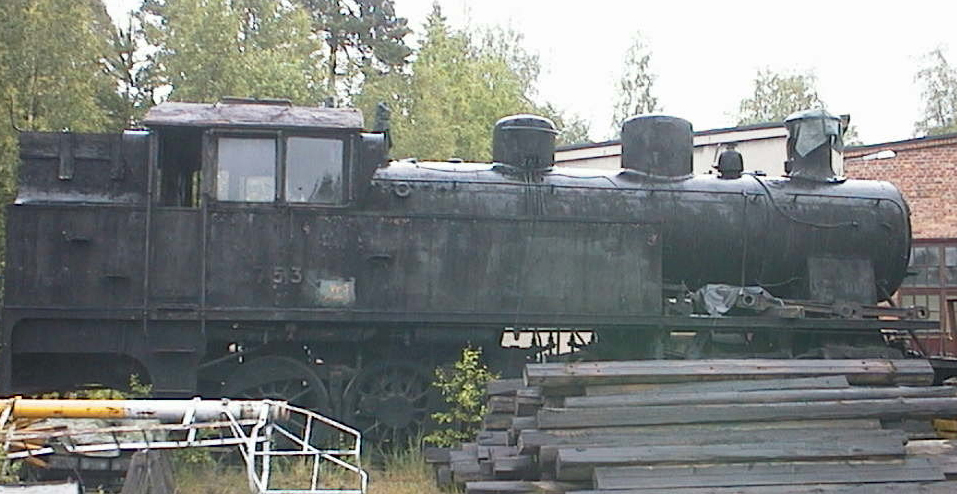
VR Class Vr3 no. 753, stored at Haapamäki in Finland

The VR Class Vr3 0-10-0T was numbered in the range from 752 to 756 and nicknamed Rooster. The first locomotive was ordered in 1924 from Hanomag in Germany. No. 755 is stored at the Finnish Railway Museum.

=== Germany ===
The 0-10-0 type proved popular in Germany. Several types of freight tender locomotives of this arrangement were built between approximately 1905 and 1915, after which the wheel arrangement was abandoned in favor of the 2-10-0. Subsequent German locomotives of this type were tank locomotives, including classes BR82, BR87, BR94^{0}, BR94^{1}, BR94^{2-4}, BR94^{5-17}, BR94^{19-21} and BR97^{5}.

=== Indonesia ===
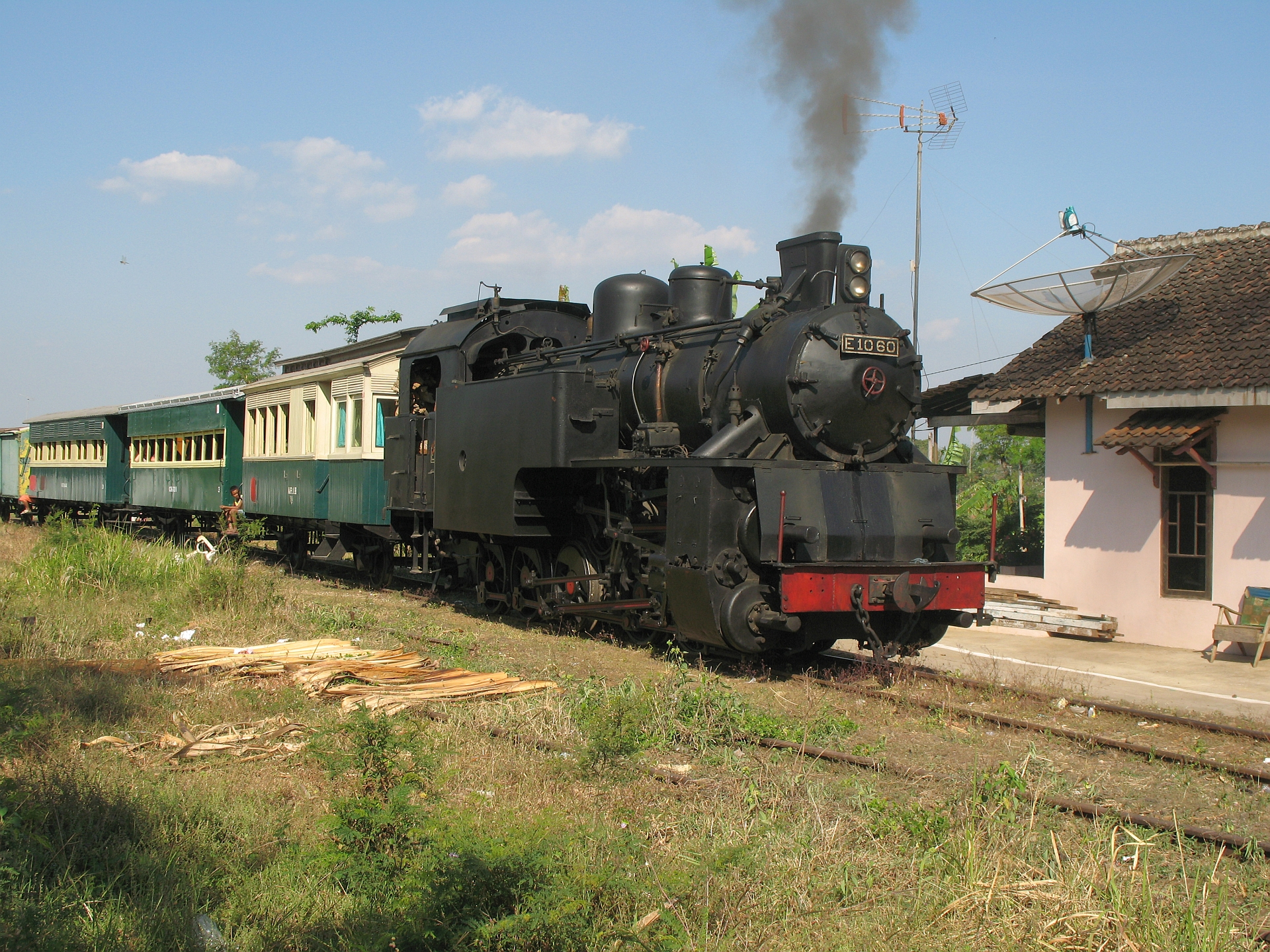
Decapod locomotive, numbered as E1060 by Japanese occupation. Currently operated by West Sumatra Division of Indonesian Railway Company in Sawahlunto, West Sumatra.

The Staatspoorwegen ter Sumatara's Westkust (SSS) built a railway line on the west coast of Sumatra from 1887 until 1896. This railway used to haul products from Ombilin coal mines to the port of Teluk Bayur in Padang. Severe terrain with 8% grades required a locomotive with great power. The E10 was a rack tank steam locomotive employed in West Sumatra, of which 22 were built from 1921 to 1928 by Esslingen in Germany and SLM (Schweizerische Lokomotiv-und Maschinenfabrik) in Switzerland. The E10 has four cylinders, with two cylinders dedicated to drive the rack gears.

The class E10 eventually consisted of 39 locomotives, of which the last seven engines were built in 1967 by Nippon Sharyo, the last steam locomotives to be built by that firm. The class was used in regular service until the mid-1980s.

=== Japan ===
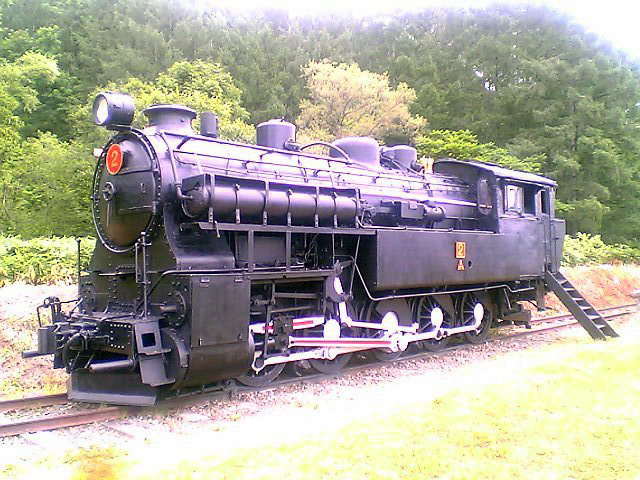
Former JNR class 4110 0-10-0 preserved in Hokkaido, Japan, 2005

Four 4100 class 0-10-0T locomotives, numbered from 4100 to 4103 and built by Krauss-Maffei in Germany, were imported to Japan in 1912. Based on this design, a total of 39 4110 Class 0-10-0T locomotives, numbered from 4110 to 4148, were built in Japan in 1914 and 1917.There were also class 300-310, built by Kisha Seizo in 1915–18.

The last members of the class were withdrawn from service on JNR in 1950, but some were sold to private freight railways and remained in service as late as 1971. Four of the locomotives were sent to the Korean Peninsula in 1938, but their subsequent fate is unknown.

=== Russia ===
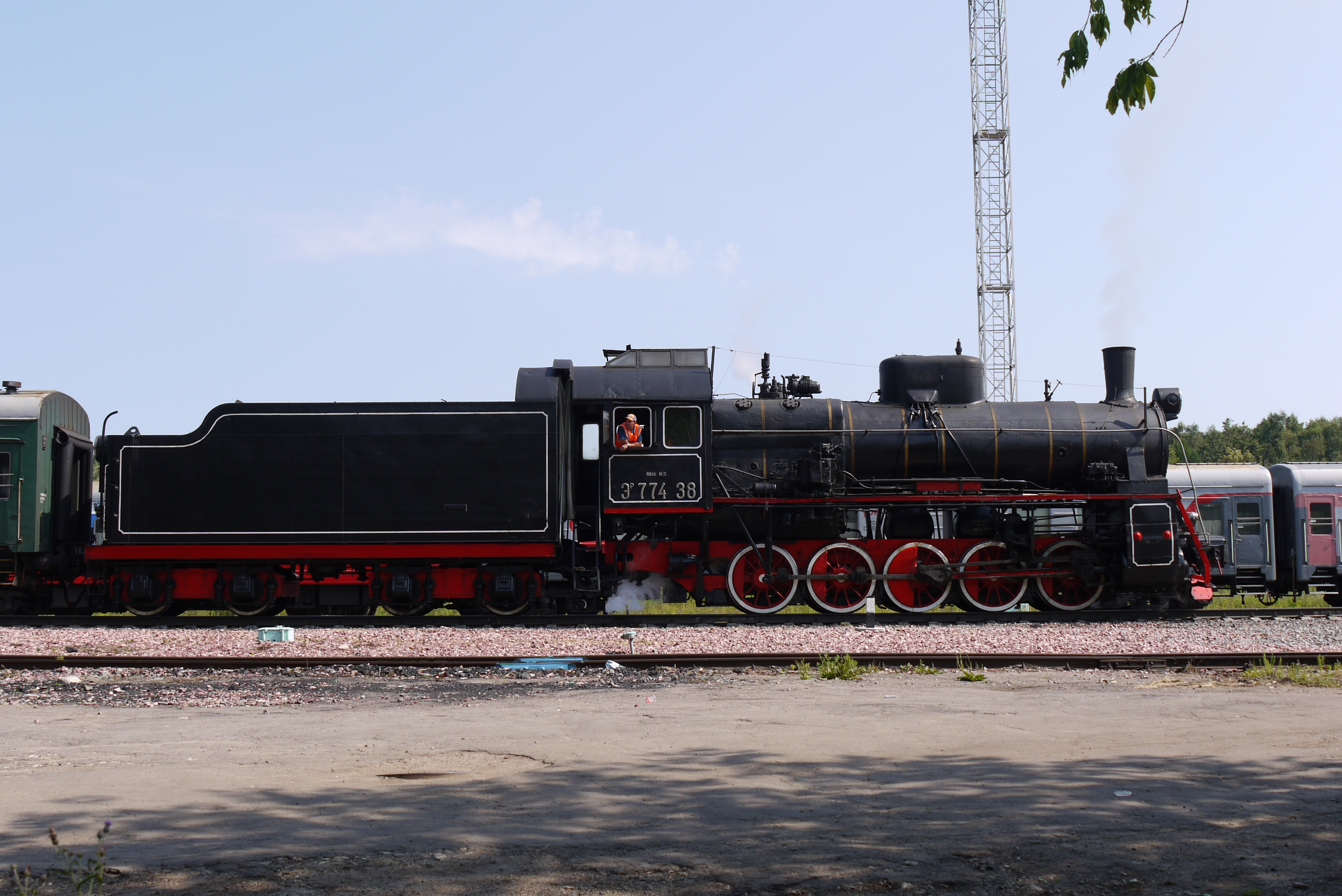
Er 774 38 0-10-0 on a Steam Special in Moscow, 11 July 2010

The 0-10-0 type was the principal standard freight locomotive in Russia and was manufactured in very large numbers. The E class (Cyrillic Э, not to be confused with Е-class), freight locomotive was made up of several sub-classes, all developed from the same original basic machine. The sub-classes included E, Em, Eg, Esh, Eu, and Er.

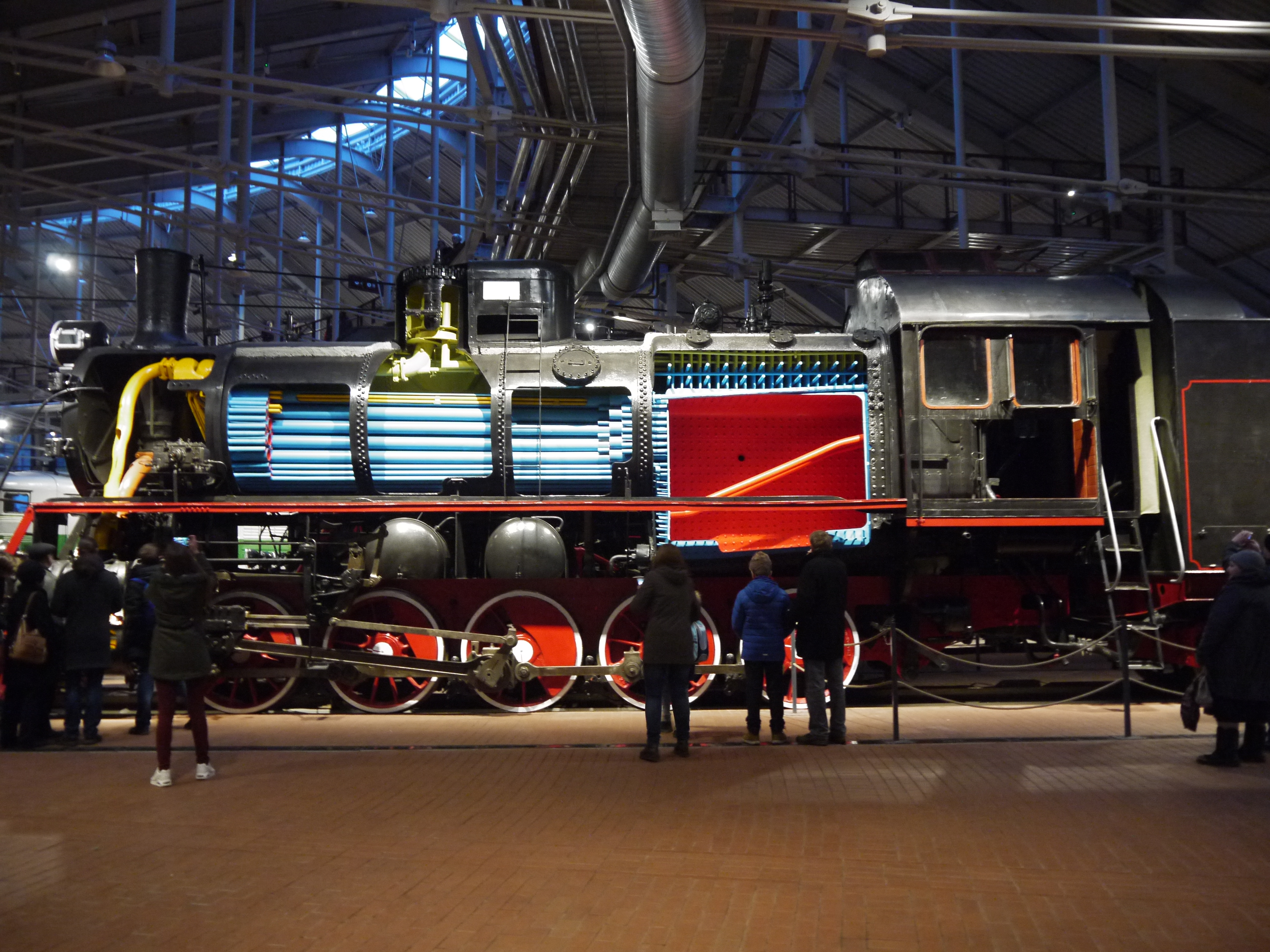
Cutaway Russian locomotive class Er 791–81 at the Russian Railway Museum St.Petersburg

A number of both the Em and Eg class received condensing tenders for working in areas where water supplies were scarce. These were designated Emk and Egk class respectively. However, these locomotives were experimental and the condensing tender was mainly used on the 2-10-0 SO19-series locomotive.

The E class was the most numerous single class of locomotive in the world, with around 11,000 manufactured in Russia and other countries such as Czechoslovakia, Germany, Sweden, Hungary and Poland. This class even far outnumbered the German DRB Class 52 2-10-0 Kriegslok. The class was eventually superseded by the SO class 2-10-0 which can be considered a further development of the E class, the L class 2-10-0 and the FD class 2-10-2. Despite being superseded, it was not replaced, and the class was widely used until the end of steam in Russia.

=== South West Africa ===
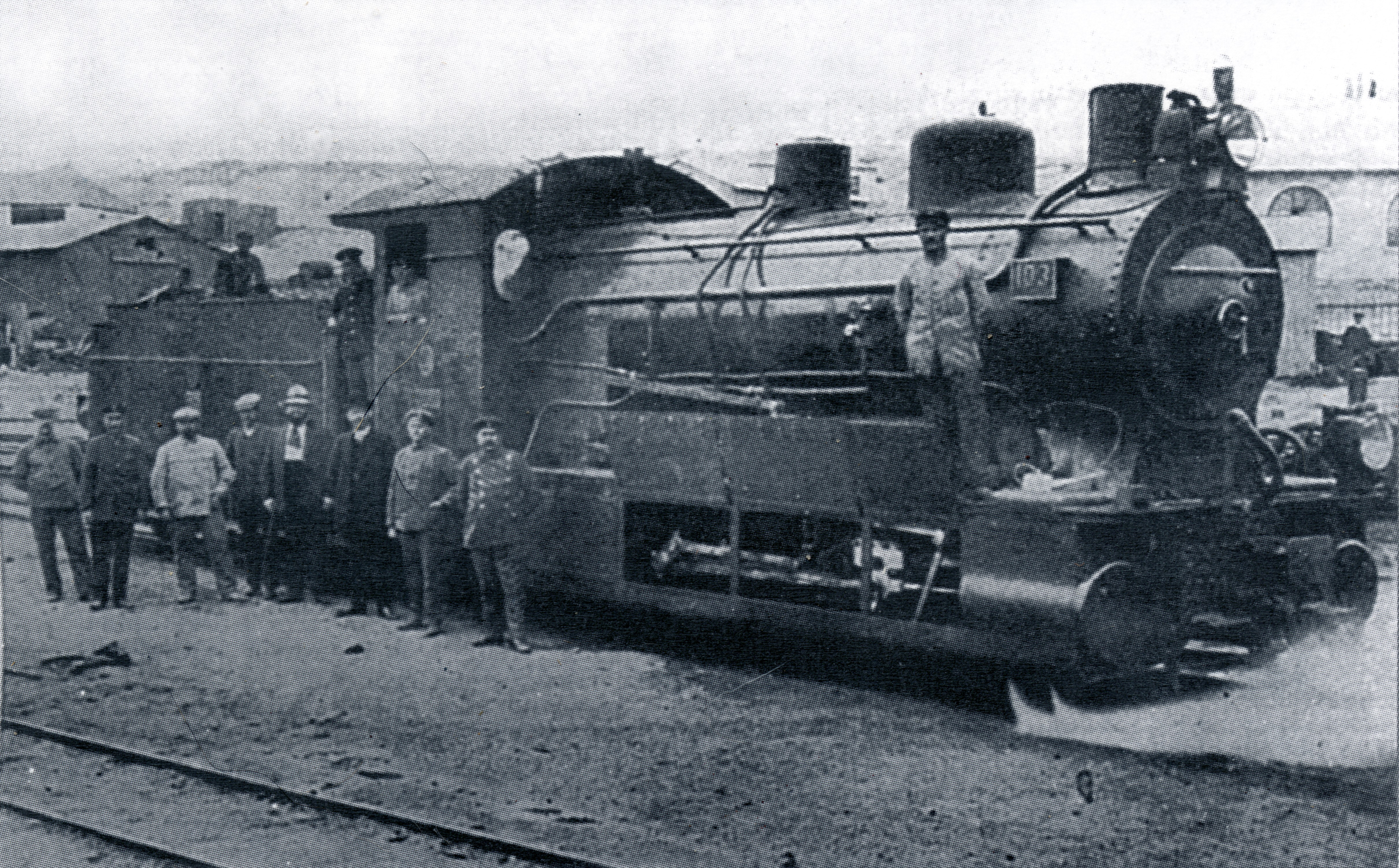
DSWA 0-10-0 no. 103, c. 1911

In 1911, the Lüderitzbucht Eisenbahn (Lüderitzbucht Railway) in German South West Africa (German: Deutsch-Südwest-Afrika) placed six 0-10-0 Decapod locomotives in service, built in 1910 by Henschel & Son for a French colony in Africa. The engines were rejected by French inspectors, however, and they were purchased by the German government for £2,000 each in 1911, on behalf of the Lüderitzbucht-Gesellschaft company who leased the Lüderitzbucht Eisenbahn and shared the profits with the government.

To protect the motion from wind-blown sand in the Namib Desert, it had plate shields arranged along the full length of the engine, hinged on the running board to allow access to the motion. The locomotives were placed in service on the Südbahn line from Lüderitzbucht via Seeheim to Kalkfontein, where they formed the mainstay of motive power. None of these engines survived the First World War.

=== Taiwan ===
A steam locomotive of this form served the sole purpose of pushing passengers up to the highest altitude station, 勝興 (Shengxing), in Taiwan.

=== Thailand ===
Two Hanomag 0-10-0 steam Locomotives, numbers 401 and 402, were imported from Germany in 1913 for service in Siam and were used on standard gauge. In 1924 they were regauged to metre gauge.

=== United Kingdom ===
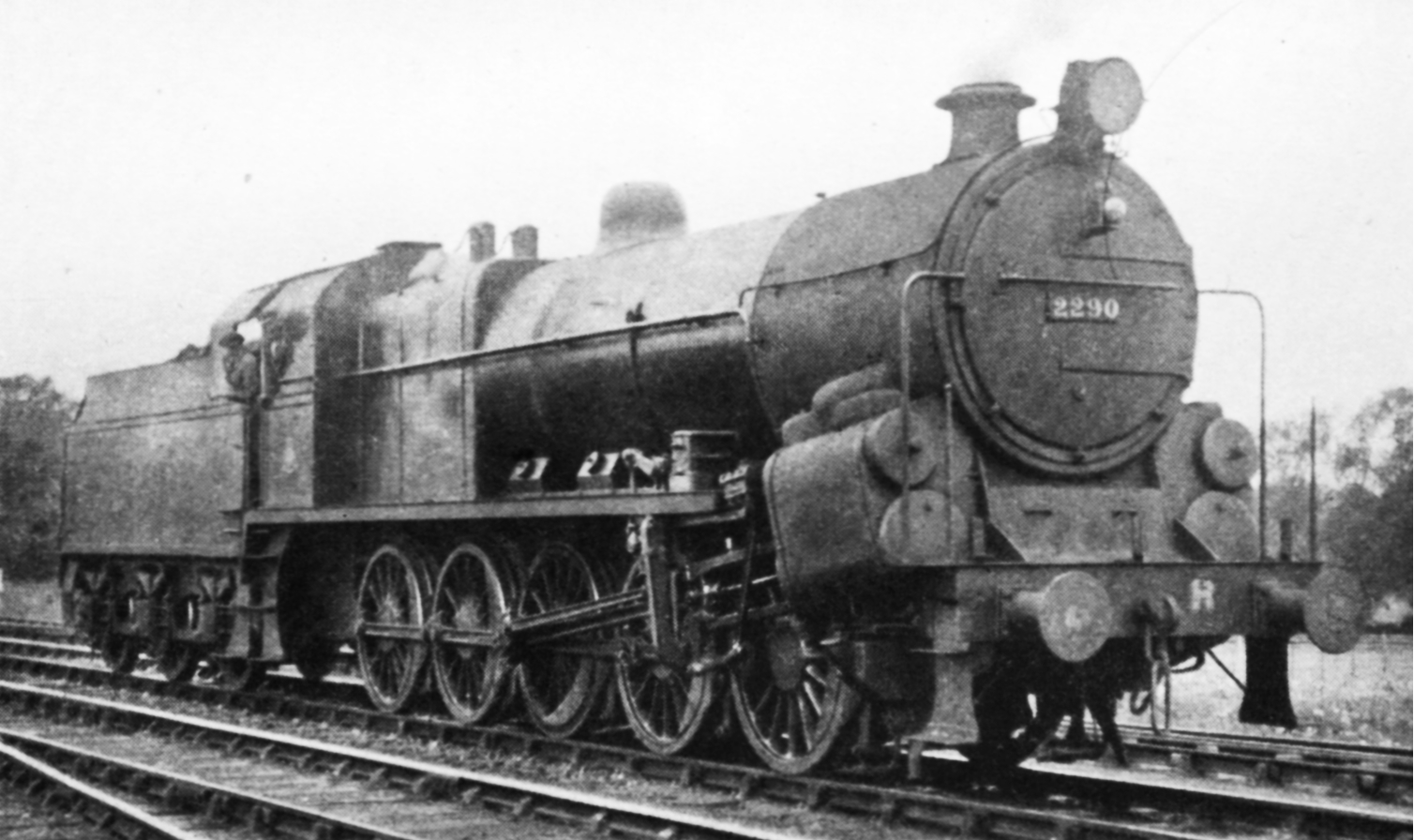
The Lickey Banker

Only two 0-10-0 locomotives saw service on British railways. One was a suburban tank locomotive prototype, built by James Holden for the Great Eastern Railway in 1902 and called the Decapod. The other was a tender locomotive, No. 2290, built by the Midland Railway in 1919, specifically for use as a banker for the Lickey Incline.

=== United States ===
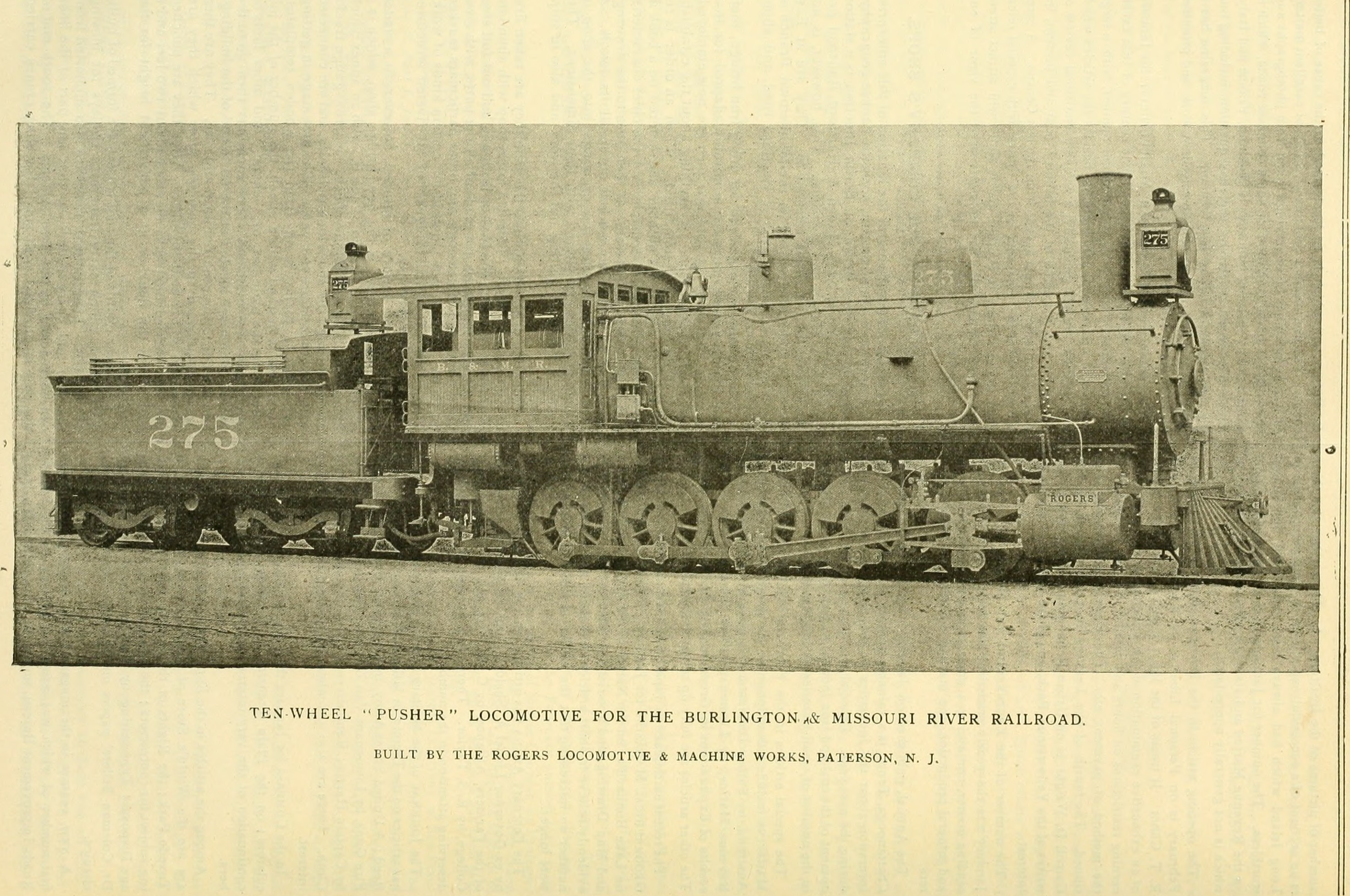
0-10-0 pusher locomotive of the Burlington & Missouri River Railroad, c. 1893

The 0-10-0 was not very popular in the United States and North America in general and probably fewer than seventy of this type were constructed. For switching work, large 0-8-0 locomotives were preferred, and when more than four driven axles were required, the preference was for articulated locomotives such as 0-6-6-0 and 0-8-8-0 Mallet engines. On mainlines, a 2-10-0 with the added stability of its leading truck, or a 2-10-2 or 2-10-4 with room for larger fireboxes, were preferred.

The first 0-10-0 in the United States was built to provide service on Madison Hill which, at 5.89%, has the steepest standard gauge grade in the country. It was a tank locomotive, designed in 1868 by Reuben Wells for the Jeffersonville, Madison and Indianapolis Railroad and named for its designer. The Reuben Wells is on display at the Children's Museum of Indianapolis. It is 35 ft (10,668 mm) long and weighs 55 tons.

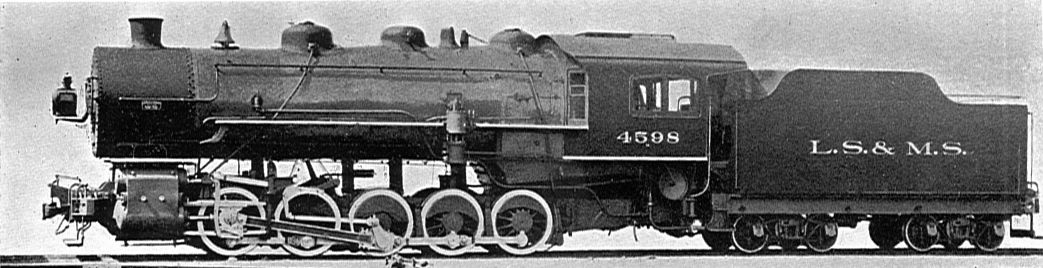
Lake Shore and Michigan Southern Railway 0-10-0 of 1907

Later 0-10-0 versions were delivered in 1891 to the St. Clair Tunnel Company to haul trains between Sarnia, Ontario and Port Huron, Michigan. The next were a series of 21 locomotives for New York Central Railroad and its subsidiaries for hump yard work. Others included seven owned by Illinois Central Railroad, fifteen by Chesapeake and Ohio Railway, two by Baltimore and Ohio Railroad, and four, the heaviest built, for Duluth, Missabe and Iron Range Railway.
