= 1959 in South Africa =

- Decades: 1930s; 1940s; 1950s; 1960s; 1970s
- See also: 1959 in South African sport; List of years in South Africa

The following lists events that happened during 1959 in South Africa.

== Incumbents ==
- Monarch: Queen Elizabeth II.
- Governor-General:
  - until 25 November: Ernest George Jansen.
  - 25 November – 11 December: Lucas Cornelius Steyn.
  - starting 11 December: Charles Robberts Swart.
- Prime Minister: Hendrik Frensch Verwoerd.
- Chief Justice: Henry Allan Fagan then Lucas Cornelius Steyn.

== Events ==
April

- 6 – The Pan-Africanist Congress led by Robert Sobukwe secedes from the African National Congress.

July

- 9 – Wing Commander Michael Beetham flying a Royal Air Force Vickers Valiant sets a record of 11 hours 27 minutes for a non-stop London-Cape Town flight.

August

- 11 – Members of the United Party led by Helen Suzman secede and form the Progressive Party.

December

- 1 – Twelve countries, including South Africa, the United States and the Soviet Union, sign the Antarctic Treaty.
- 11 – Charles Robberts Swart is appointed the 11th Governor-General of the Union of South Africa.
- 12 – The 47th Annual Conference of the African National Congress takes place in Durban.

Unknown date

- Papwa Sewgolum, a South African Indian golfer, wins the Dutch Open tournament.

== Births ==
- 1 January – Thulas Nxesi, national minister
- 7 January – Peter Mokaba, member of the South African parliament, deputy minister in the government of Nelson Mandela (d. 2002)
- 14 March – Tertius Bosch, cricketer.
- 16 March – Tito Mboweni, politician.
- 4 April – Kenneth Segal, South African-born Israeli industrial designer and educator
- 7 April – Etsko Schuitema, Afrikaner businessman
- 21 April – Manne Dipico, politician
- 16 September – Dave Richardson (cricketer), cricketer.
- 18 November – Christine Barkhuizen le Roux, writer (d. 2020)

== Deaths ==
- April 15 – Leonard Beyers, South African army general (b. 1894)
- February 7 – D. F. Malan, South African politician, 4th Prime Minister of South Africa (b. 1874)
- April 15 – Leonard Beyers, South African army general (b. 1894)

== Railways ==
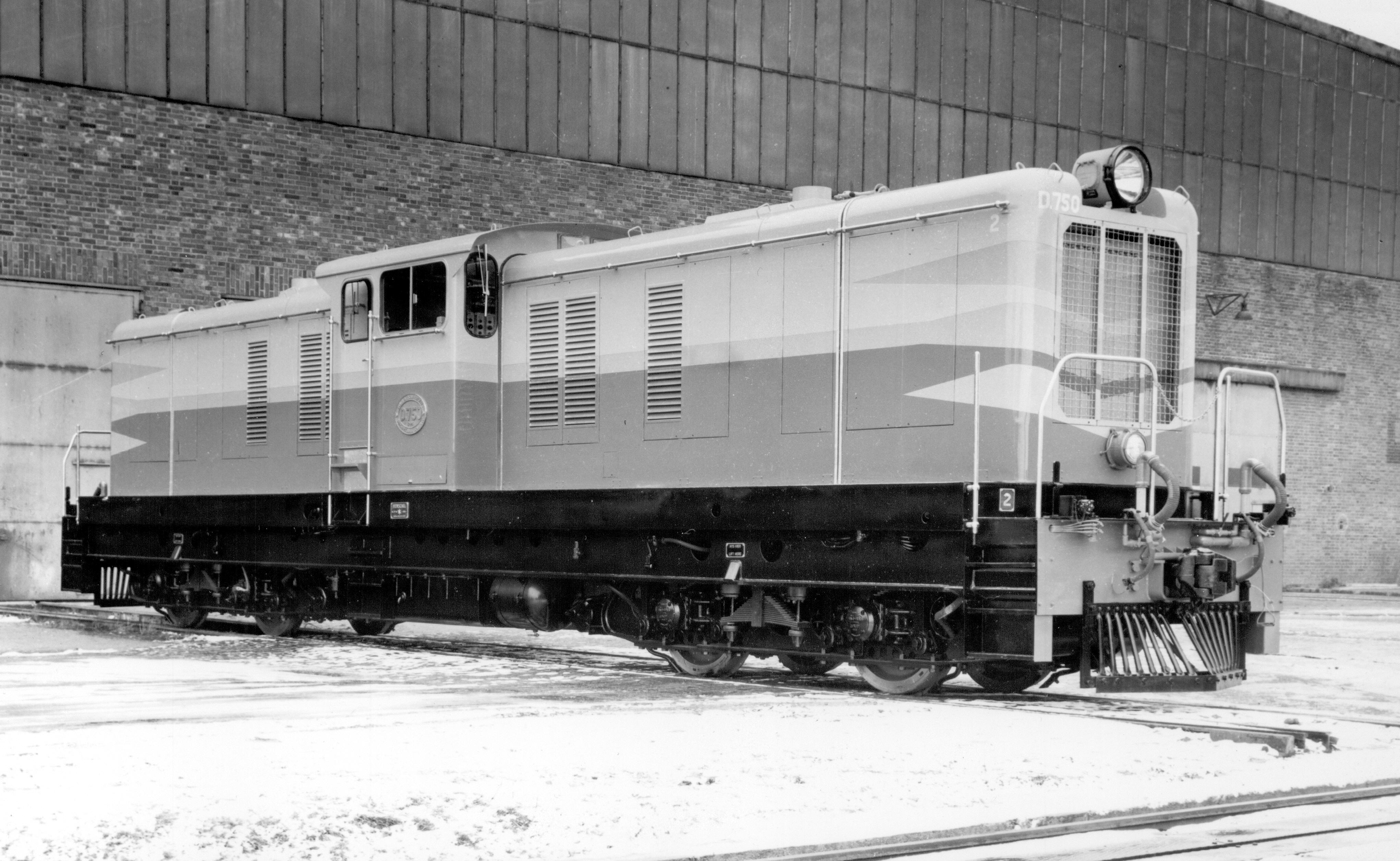
Class 1-DH (DH-1420)

=== Locomotives ===
Three new Cape gauge locomotive types enter service on the South African Railways.

- May–July – Seven Class 1-DH Henschel type DH 1420 diesel-hydraulic locomotives.
- November – The first of 115 Class 32-000 General Electric type U18C1 diesel-electric locomotives in South West Africa.
- The first of 135 Class 5E1, Series 1 electric locomotives, an upgraded and more powerful version of the Class 5E.
