= 1958 in South Africa =

- Decades: 1930s; 1940s; 1950s; 1960s; 1970s
- See also: List of years in South Africa

The following lists events that happened during 1958 in South Africa.

== Incumbents ==
- Monarch: Queen Elizabeth II.
- Governor-General and High Commissioner for Southern Africa: Ernest George Jansen.
- Prime Minister: Johannes Gerhardus Strijdom (until 24 August), Hendrik Frensch Verwoerd (starting 2 September).
- Chief Justice: Henry Allan Fagan.

== Events ==
April

- 16 – The last general election of the Union of South Africa takes place.

May

- 6 – Margaret Rheeder is hanged in Pretoria for poisoning her husband, Benjamin Fredenman.

September

- 2 – Hendrik Verwoerd becomes the 6th Prime Minister of South Africa.

October

- 13 – Penny Coelen is crowned as Miss World 1958 during the 8th Miss World pageant, the first South African to win the title.

December

- 12–14 – The 46th Annual Conference of the African National Congress is held in Durban.

== Births ==
- 27 February – Naas Botha, rugby player
- 14 April – Danie Gerber, rugby player
- 14 April – Blade Nzimande, politician, national minister, General Secretary of the South African Communist Party
- 21 April – Senzo Mchunu, politician, national minister
- 21 April – Lindiwe Zulu, national minister
- 30 April – Mbhazima Shilowa, trade unionist and politician.
- 27 May – Cheryl Carolus, activist and politician.
- 5 June – Jackson Mthembu, politician, national minister
- 17 June – Barbara Creecy; anti-apartheid movement activist, member of the African National Congress, national minister
- 28 July – Deon van der Walt, tenor. (d. 2005)
- 4 August – Steve Kekana, singer & songwriter
- 7 August – Aaron Motsoaledi, politician, national minister
- 24 October – Gcina Mhlophe, actress, storyteller, poet, playwright, director and author
- 27 October – Jonathan Shapiro, cartoonist
- 15 December – Don Laka, jazz musician, songwriter, producer. Most well known for being the co-founder of record label, Kalawa Jazmee Records.

== Deaths ==
- 2 May – Henry Cornelius, film director, producer, screenwriter and editor. (b. 1913)

== Railways ==
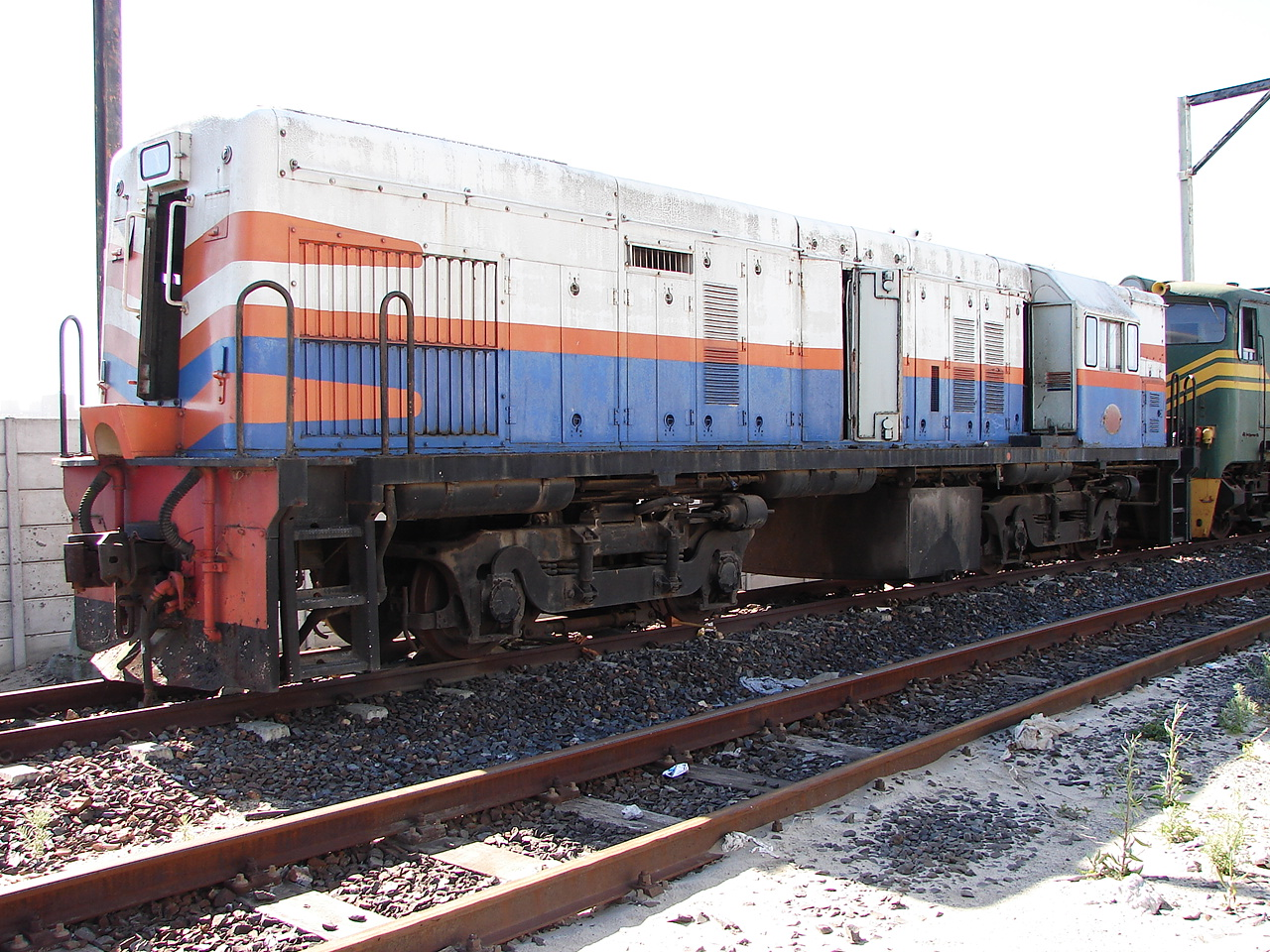
Class 1-DE (GE U12B)

=== Locomotives ===
Two new Cape gauge locomotive types enter service on the South African Railways.

- The first of fifty-five Class 5E, Series 3 electric locomotives.
- In June and July forty-five Class 1-DE General Electric type U12B locomotives are the first diesel-electrics to enter SAR service in quantity.
