= 1960 in South Africa =

- Decades: 1940s; 1950s; 1960s; 1970s; 1980s
- See also: 1960 in South African sport; List of years in South Africa

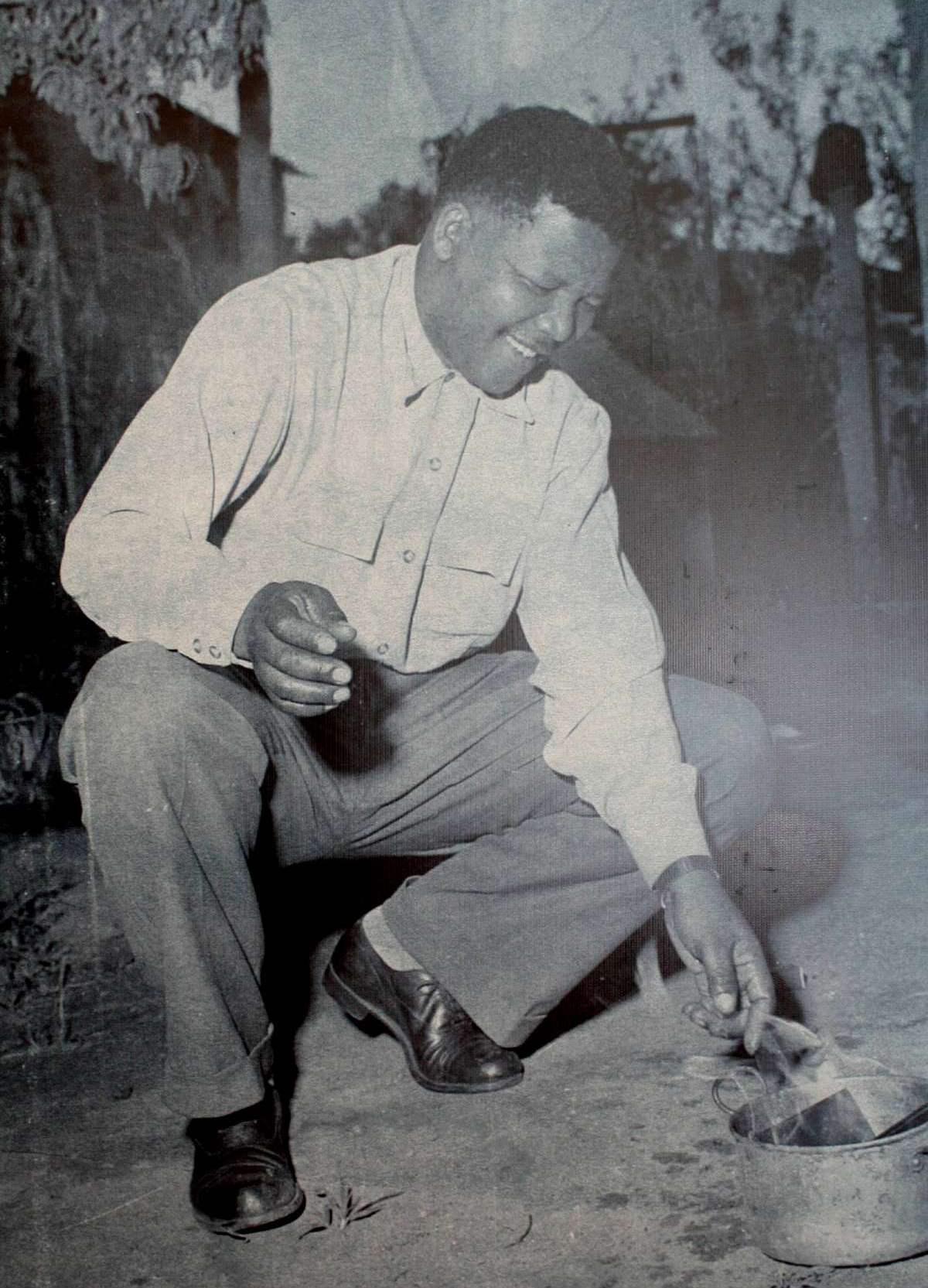
Nelson Mandela burning Pass in 1960

The following lists events that happened during 1960 in South Africa.

== Incumbents ==
- Monarch: Queen Elizabeth II
- Governor-General: Charles Robberts Swart (from 12 January).
- Prime Minister: Hendrik Verwoerd.
- Chief Justice: Lucas Cornelius Steyn.

== Events ==
January

- 21 – 435 miners die in the Coalbrook mining disaster, the worst mine disaster in South Africa.

February

- 3 – Harold Macmillan delivers his Wind of Change speech to the Parliament of South Africa in Cape Town.

March

- 21 – Police kill an estimated 69 people during the Sharpeville massacre.
- 22 – Hendrik Verwoerd tells Parliament that the Anti-Pass Resistance in Sharpeville, Gauteng was not targeted against the government.
- 23 – Robert Sobukwe, leader of the Pan Africanist Congress, Albert Lutuli and 11 others are arrested for incitement of riots.
- 24 – All public meetings of more than 12 people are banned.
- 30 – The government declares a State of Emergency.

April

- 8 – The government bans the African National Congress and the Pan Africanist Congress with the coming into effect of the Unlawful Organisations Act.
- 9 – David Pratt shoots and wounds Hendrik Verwoerd, the Prime Minister of South Africa, (in revenge for the Sharpeville massacre) while he opens the Rand Easter Show at Milner Park, Johannesburg.
- 19 – The South West Africa People's Organisation (SWAPO) is founded in Windhoek, South West Africa.

May

- 4 – Robert Sobukwe, President of the Pan Africanist Congress, is sentenced to 3 years imprisonment for incitement of black Africans to urge the repeal of pass laws.
- 6 – Umhlobo Wenene FM is founded.

July

- 15 – The first Boeing 707 arrives in South Africa.

October

- 5 – The white population votes in a referendum to sever South Africa's last links with the British monarchy and become a republic.

November

- 14 – Serial Killer "Pangaman" Elias Xitavhudzi is hanged for the murders of 16 white men and women in Atteridgeville in the 1950s.

== Births ==
- 12 March – Sello Maake Ka-Ncube, actor
- 14 April – Pat Symcox, cricketer
- 8 June – Frank Opperman, actor
- 24 June – Carel du Plessis, rugby player
- 16 July – PJ Powers, musician
- 24 August – Geraldine Fraser-Moleketi, politician
- 25 August – David Mabuza, Deputy President of South Africa (d. 2025)
- 13 September – Kevin Carter, photojournalist (d. 1994)
- 18 October – Mark Mathabane, author, lecturer and college professor

== Deaths ==
- 13 June – Ken McArthur, athlete. (b. 1881)
