= 1957 in South Africa =

- Decades: 1930s; 1940s; 1950s; 1960s; 1970s
- See also: List of years in South Africa

The following lists events that happened during 1957 in South Africa.

== Incumbents ==
- Monarch: Queen Elizabeth II.
- Governor-General and High Commissioner for Southern Africa: Ernest George Jansen.
- Prime Minister: Johannes Gerhardus Strijdom.
- Chief Justice: Albert van der Sandt Centlivres then Henry Allan Fagan.

== Events ==
January

- 30 – The General Assembly of the United Nations calls on South Africa to reconsider its apartheid policy.

May

- 2 – Die Stem van Suid-Afrika, written by Cornelis Jacobus Langenhoven, becomes the official National Anthem

July

- 8 – The United States and South Africa sign a nuclear cooperation agreement, the terms of which state that the United States will provide South Africa with a nuclear research reactor, supply enriched uranium as fuel, and train additional scientists and reactor technicians.

December

- 16 – The 45th Annual Conference of the African National Congress is held in Orlando, Johannesburg.
- A series of shark attacks near Durban occur during Black December.

== Births ==
- 7 January – Ivan Glasenberg, billionaire businessman.
- 23 March – Edna Molewa, politician.
- 26 May – Dan Roodt, activist, author and politician.
- June – Peter de Villiers, Springboks coach.
- 14 September; Kepler Wessels, cricketer.

== Deaths ==
- 23 April – Roy Campbell, poet and satirist. (b. 1901)
- 14 November – Jacobus Hendrik Pierneef, landscape artist. (b. 1886)
- 10 December – James Stevenson-Hamilton, first warden of the Kruger National Park. (b. 1867)

== Railways ==
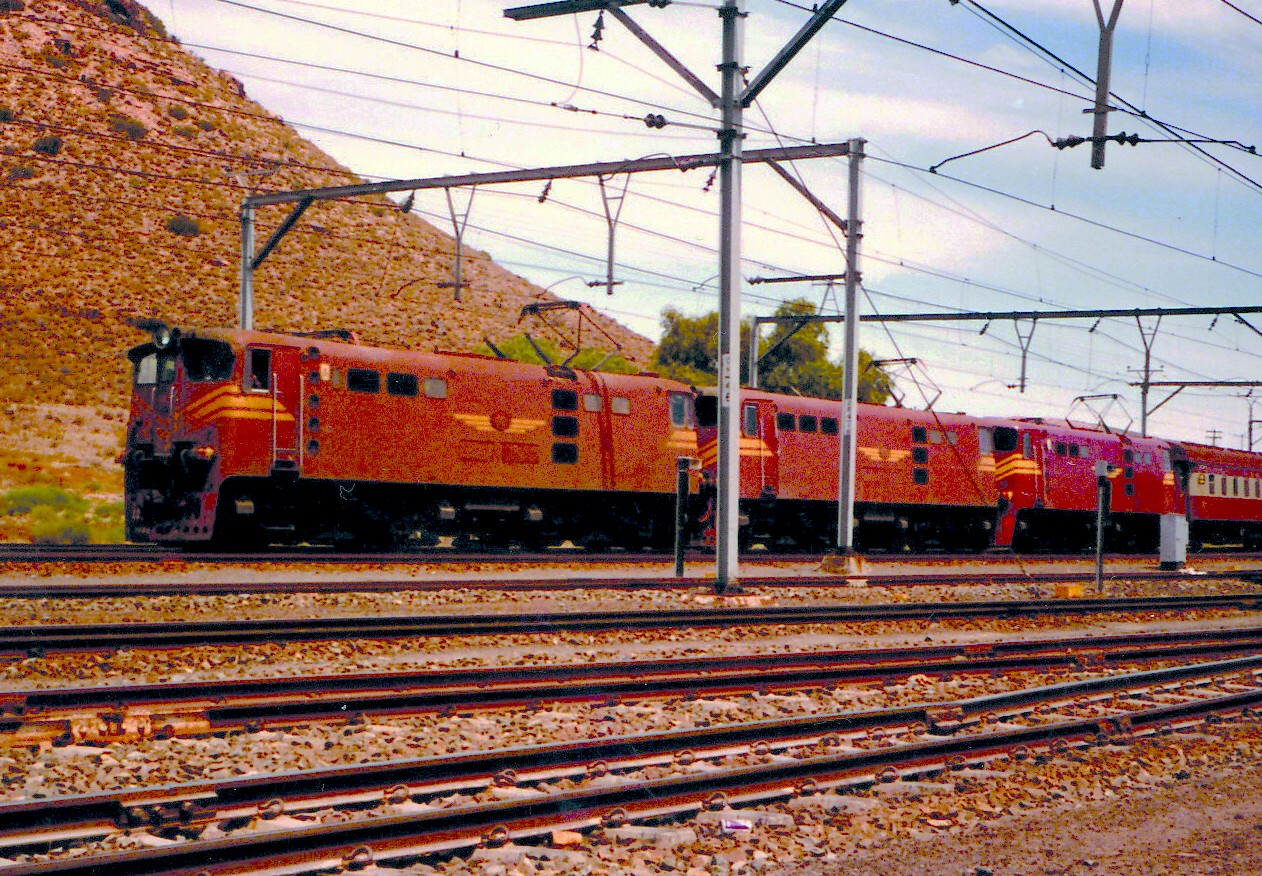
Class 5E, Series 2

=== Locomotives ===
- The South African Railways places the first of forty-five Class 5E, Series 2 electric locomotives in mainline service.
