= 1961 in South Africa =

- Decades: 1940s; 1950s; 1960s; 1970s; 1980s
- See also: List of years in South Africa

The following lists events that happened during 1961 in South Africa.

== Incumbents ==
- Monarch: Queen Elizabeth II (until 31 May)
- Governor-General: Charles Robberts Swart (until 30 April).
- State President: Charles Robberts Swart (from 31 May).
- Prime Minister: Hendrik Verwoerd.
- Chief Justice: Lucas Cornelius Steyn.

== Events ==
February

- 14 – Decimal Day - Decimalisation of currency replaces the South African pound with the South African rand.

March

- 15 – South Africa announces its intended withdrawal from the Commonwealth upon becoming a republic. Prime Minister Verwoerd was attending the 1961 Commonwealth Prime Ministers' Conference at the time. He had tried to seek permission for South Africa to remain a Commonwealth member state upon becoming a republic on 31 May, but it was rejected, because of the South African Government's apartheid policies.
- The International Confederation of Free Trade Unions submits a memorandum to the United Nations General Assembly calling for economic sanctions against South Africa.

April

- 30 – Charles Robberts Swart resigns as Governor-General of South Africa.

Lucas Cornelius Steyn becomes Officer Administering the Government under his dormant commission as a result.

May

- 31 – South Africa becomes a republic, and temporarily withdraws from the Commonwealth (which lasted until 1 June 1994, when South Africa became a republic in the Commonwealth of Nations).
- 31 – Charles Robberts Swart is sworn in as the first State President of South Africa during the inauguration of the Republic ceremony in the Palace of Justice facing onto Church Square, Pretoria.

June

- 4 – The Iraqi Foreign Minister, Hassim Jawad, announces that Iraq will not recognise the South African government because of its apartheid policy.

September

- 11 – Poqo, the armed wing of the Pan-African Congress, is established.

October

- The National Party wins the 1961 South African general election, winning 105 of 160 seats in Parliament.
- The Nobel Peace Prize is awarded to the president of the African National Congress, Dr Albert Lutuli.

November

- Umkhonto we Sizwe, the armed wing of the African National Congress, is established.

December

- 16 – Umkhonto we Sizwe commences its sabotage campaign with a bomb attack on the Durban office of the Department of Bantu Administration and Development.

Unknown date

- Eendrag Men's Residence opens its doors to students of Stellenbosch University.
- Mimi Coertse is awarded the Medal of Honour of Die Suid-Afrikaanse Akademie vir Wetenskap en Kuns.
- The Department of Indian Affairs is established.
- South Korea establishes diplomatic relations with South Africa. Diplomatic relations would last until 1978, when South Korea withdrew its recognition in protest of apartheid. They would not be restored thereafter until December 1992.

== Births ==
- 1 February – Jeremy Maggs, journalist, radio host and television presenter.
- 2 February – Hastings Ndlovu, schoolboy who was shot and killed in Soweto uprising (d. 1976)
- 4 March – Roger Wessels, golfer.
- 10 April – Tian Viljoen, tennis player.
- 16 April – Schalk van der Merwe, tennis player. (d. 2016)
- 1 May – Christo Steyn, tennis player.
- 23 June – Ivan Wingreen, cricketer. (d. 2014).
- 10 July – Uli Schmidt, former rugby player & Springboks doctor.
- 30 August – Brian Mitchell, boxer.
- 6 September – Adolf Malan, rugby player.
- 28 September – Wayne Westner, golfer. (d. 2017)
- 10 October – Jonathan Butler, singer-songwriter and guitarist.
- 14 October – Kevin Moir, tennis player.
- 5 December – Ada Booyens, race walker.
- 27 December – Gert Smal, rugby player & coach

== Deaths ==
- 4 August - John Hewitt, zoologist and archaeologist (b. 1880)

== Sports ==
=== Rugby ===
- 13 May – The South African Springboks beat Ireland 24–8.
