= 1962 in South Africa =

- Decades: 1940s; 1950s; 1960s; 1970s; 1980s
- See also: 1962 in South African sport; List of years in South Africa

Events from the year 1962 in South Africa. This year is notable for its internal and international resistance campaigns against the country's Apartheid legislation. Umkhonto we Sizwe, the militant wing of the African National Congress, made its first sabotage attacks in 1961, and Nelson Mandela traveled to Ethiopia to rally support for Umkhonto and justify the attacks. Nelson Mandela was sentenced to jail for 5 years upon returning to South Africa for illegally leaving the country. The international sporting community also showed its displeasure with the government's laws. FIFA suspended South Africa in 1962 for fielding an exclusively-white South African national football team, forcing South African football authorities to add black players to the team. The government, in turn strengthened methods of enforcing Apartheid, and the Robben Island prison was made a political prison in 1962.

== Incumbents ==
- State President: Charles Robberts Swart.
- Prime Minister: Hendrik Verwoerd.
- Chief Justice: Lucas Cornelius Steyn.

== Events ==
January

- Nelson Mandela leaves South Africa for military training with Umkhonto we Sizwe.

March

- 12 – Defence Minister Jim Fouché outlines South Africa's defence policy to make South Africa self-supporting in military equipment.

May

- 6 – Victorio Carpio (Philippines) and Martinez de Alva (Mexico), both United Nations representatives, begin informal talks in Pretoria about South West Africa with Hendrik Verwoerd, Prime Minister of South Africa.

July

- The Sabotage Act removes freedom of speech from opposition publications.
- 20 – Nelson Mandela returns to South Africa after military training with Umkhonto we Sizwe in Algeria.

August

- 5 – Nelson Mandela is arrested near Howick.

October

- 13 – Helen Joseph becomes the first person to be placed under house arrest under the Sabotage Act.
- Lillian Ngoyi is banned for 10 years, confining her to Orlando Township in Johannesburg and forbidding her to attend any gatherings.

November

- 6 – The United Nations calls for sanctions to isolate South Africa politically and economically under Resolution 1761.

December

- 10 – Martin Luther King Jr. and Chief Albert Lutuli launch a Human Rights Campaign in which they appeal for "Action against Apartheid".
- Seven members of POQO, the military wing of the Pan Africanist Congress, die in a failed attempt to assassinate Chief Kaiser Matanzima.

Unknown date

- FIFA suspends South Africa.
- A maximum security prison is completed on Robben Island.
- Dieter Gerhardt begins spying for the Soviet Union.

== Births ==
- 1 January – Jaco Reinach, rugby player & father to Springboks rugby player Cobus Reinach (died 1997)
- 28 January – Patrice Motsepe, mining billionaire businessman, founder of founder and executive chairman of African Rainbow Minerals.
- 13 April – Chris Riddell, illustrator
- 28 April – Darrell Roodt, film director, screenwriter and producer. Best known for the 1992 film Sarafina
- 16 June – Arnold Vosloo, international actor.
- 2 July – Neil Tovey, captain of the South Africa national football team
- 10 July – Arthur Mafokate, recording artist, record producer & businessman.
- 15 July – Ebrahim Rasool, politician.
- 29 August – Steve Hofmeyr, singer, songwriter and actor.
- 7 September – Cliff Simon, athlete and actor (died 2021)
- 15 September – François Bloemhof, author, playwright and composer.
- 28 September – Thuli Madonsela, politician, advocate and Professor of law. Most well-known for being the Public Protector of South Africa.
- 11 October – Kevin Smith, best known for his portrayal of Frank Xavier on the SABC 3 soap opera, Isidingo.
- 12 October – Michelle Botes, best known for her portrayal of Cherel de Villiers Haines on the soap opera, Isidingo.
- 8 December – Greg Marinovich, photojournalist.

== Deaths ==
- 23 September - Herbert Annesley Packer, Royal Navy Admiral and Commander-in-Chief of South Atlantic, dies in Cape Town (b. 1894)
- 21 December - Gary Hocking, racing driver and Grand Prix motorcycle racing world champion, killed during practice at the 1962 Natal Grand Prix in Durban
