= Ban (law) =

Legal prohibition of some act or object

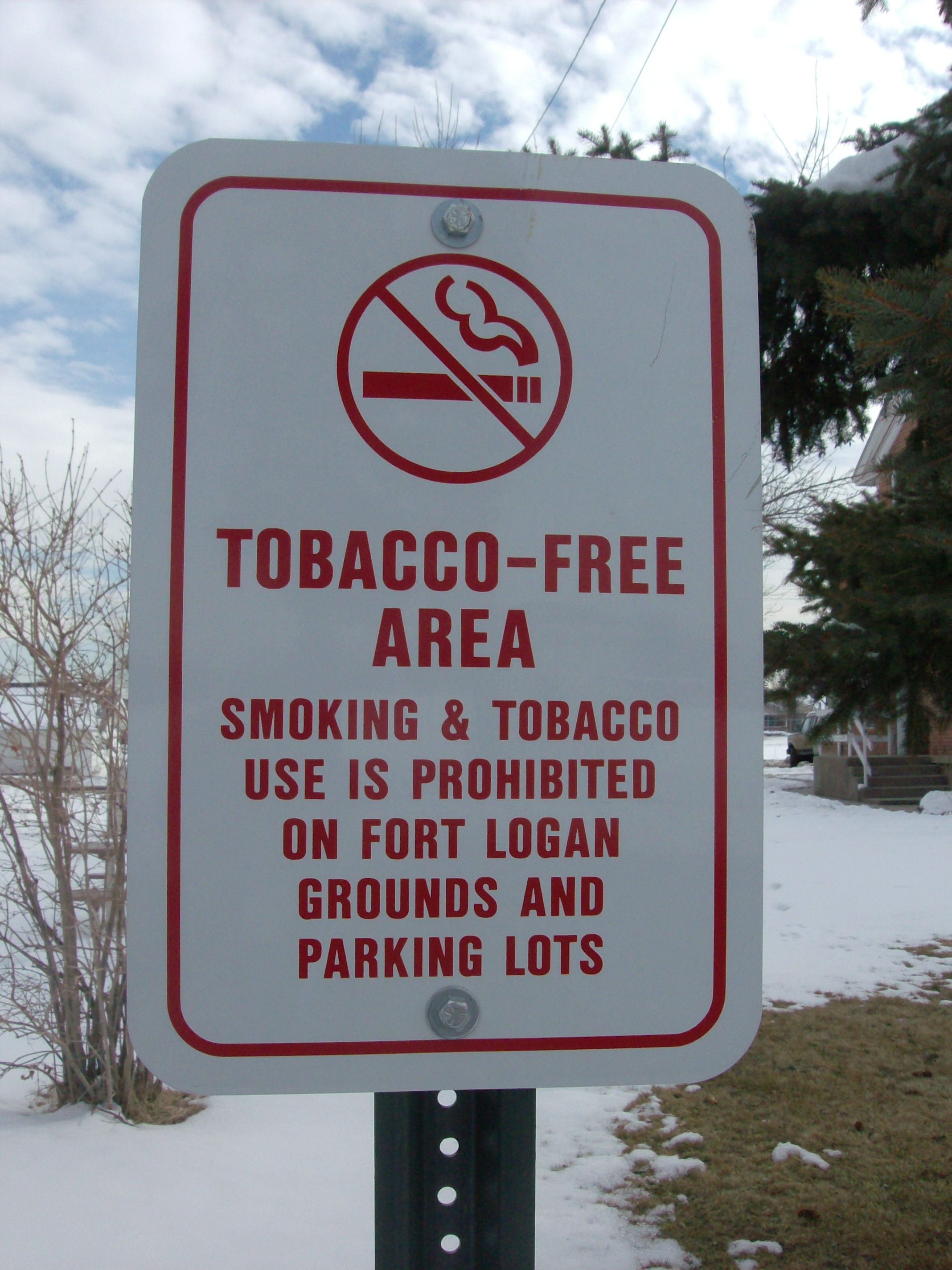
A "no smoking" sign, expressing a ban on smoking in that particular place

A ban is a formal or informal prohibition of something. Bans are formed for the prohibition of activities within a certain political territory. Some bans in commerce are referred to as embargoes. Ban is also used as a verb similar in meaning to "to prohibit".

== Etymology ==
In current English usage, ban is mostly synonymous with prohibition. Historically, Old English (ge)bann is a derivation from the verb bannan "to summon, command, proclaim" from an earlier Common Germanic *bannan "to command, forbid, banish, curse". The modern sense "to prohibit" is influenced by the cognate Old Norse banna "to curse, to prohibit" and also from Old French ban, ultimately a loan from Old Frankish, meaning "outlawry, banishment".

The Indo-European etymology of the Germanic term is from a root *bha- meaning "to speak". Its original meaning was magical, referring to utterances that carried a power to curse.

== Banned political parties ==
In many countries political parties or groups are banned. Parties may be banned for many reasons, including extremism and anti-democratic ideologies, on ethnic or religious grounds, and sometimes simply because the group opposes government policies, with the ban sometimes alleging wrongdoing as the cause. Germany, for instance, has a long history behind its modern practice of banning political parties. The Nazi Party was banned in 1923; after the Nazi Party came into power in 1933 opposing parties such as the Social Democrats (SPD) and Communist Party of Germany (KPD) were banned, the Nazi Party was again banned and the ban on other parties lifted after the Nazi defeat in 1945, and the Communist Party was again banned from 1956 to 1968.

== Banning marriages ==
There have been many bans on marriages, and sometimes other sexual liaisons, between people of different ethnic background or religion, for example between non-Jews and Jews in Nazi Germany, people classified as "white" and non-whites in apartheid South Africa, etc.

For much of the 1800s and 1900s there were bans on marriage between people of different races (interracial marriage) in many of the United States. However, the ban on interracial marriage was overturned by the Supreme Court of the United States in 1967 in the landmark civil rights case Loving v. Virginia, in which the Court ruled Virginia's miscegenation law an unconstitutional violation of the fundamental right to marriage. Historically child marriage was common, but is now banned in many countries.

== Banned people ==
=== Holy Roman Empire ===
The Imperial ban was a form of outlawry in the Holy Roman Empire. At different times, it could be declared by the Holy Roman Emperor, by courts including the League of the Holy Court (German: Vehmgericht, pronounced [ˈfeːmɡəʁɪçt]) and the Reichskammergericht, or by the Imperial Diet. People under Imperial ban lost all their rights and possessions, and anyone had the right to rob, injure or kill such persons without legal consequences. The Imperial ban automatically followed the excommunication of a person, and extended to anyone offering help to a person under the imperial ban.

=== Under apartheid in South Africa ===
During the apartheid régime in South Africa, the National Party government issued banning orders to individuals seen to be threats to its power — often black politicians or organizations — these banning orders acted as suppression orders. Individuals or organisations and critical medias banned by the Suppression of Communism Act, 1950, which effectively defined "Communism" as opposition to the government, could not communicate with more than one person at any time unless at home or travel to outside a specific magisterial district without government approval, thus preventing them from engaging in political activities. The order had mostly domestic effect with versatile legal formative effects, such as local or supra-regional residence restrictions, the prohibition of public expression of opinion, prohibition of printed publications and prohibition of citation in journalistic or scientific contexts the writings of the affecting persons or the participation of gatherings.

Measures of this kind were also applied to groups, organisations and institutions like the Defence Aid Fund for Southern Africa in 1966 and the Christian Institute in 1977. There were several laws that legalised such actions in the form of the Riotous Assemblies Act in 1914 and later 1956, the Unlawful Organisations Act in 1960, the Suppression of Communism Amendment Act in 1967, and the Internal Security Act in 1976, 1982, and 1986. The General Law Amendment Act, No. 76 of 1962 empowered the Minister of Justice to publish the banned persons in the Government Gazette. Helen Suzman, a liberal member of the South African parliament, defended the right of free assembly and freedom of expression for all citizens in 1986 and pointed to the growing confrontation between the black population and the police.

The banishment of persons, i.e. expulsion from their place of residence, was practised in smaller numbers. Between 1948 and 1967, this affected 156 people. After 1972, this measure was only applied sporadically.

== Health and safety ==
Bans in various jurisdictions on possession of some weapons, smoking, and narcotic drugs are enacted to exert control over the general public.

== See also ==
- Ban (medieval)
- Censure and Excommunication, which may result in a ban pursuant to religious law
- Export restriction
- Herem (censure), a ban pursuant to Jewish law
- Homo sacer and the sovereign state of exception
- List of banned books
- List of banned computer and video games
- List of banned films
- List of banned political parties
- List of people subject to banning orders under apartheid
- List of websites blocked in China
- Ostracism
- Prohibition—usually referring to historical and current laws regulating prohibition of alcohol
- Shunning practiced in the Amish community
- Use of performance-enhancing drugs in sport
