= S v Mpetha =

S v Mpetha and Others (1981) was a court case in which nineteen accused were charged under the Terrorism Act, 1967 with participation in terroristic activities and also on two counts of murder. There were alternative charges of public violence and conspiracy in contravention of the Riotous Assemblies Act, 1956.

The court held that the use of particulars is intended to meet a requirement imposed in fairness and justice to both the accused and the prosecution.

There is, however, some difficulty in appreciating just what is meant by fairness and justice to the prosecution because it would seem that the prosecution, if it has a case, must in the nature of things know in detail all about the alleged offense.

If the prosecution does not know any particulars, it can simply say so, and it is then protected by the provisions of s84(2) of the CPA.

As to whether the summary which the State has furnished constitutes an adequate summary, at the very least the Attorney-General is required by law to form an opinion as to its adequacy.

Implicit in this is the duty to bring a fair, objective and responsible judgment to bear upon what facts it is desirable for the accused to know in order to understand fully the allegations against him and to prepare and present his defense.

The purpose of the summary of substantial facts is to fill out the rather terse picture almost inevitably presented by the indictment.

The greater the lack of proper information in the summary of substantial facts the greater is the need for detailed particulars to be supplied to fill in the picture sketched in outline in the indictment.

This was an extremely complex case, but the summary of substantial facts was very short.

Accordingly, the State was ordered to give sufficient particulars to satisfy certain specified guidelines, the nature whereof were fully detailed, and directed to note the Court's disapproval of the frequent use of the expression "and/or."
