= 1960 in South African sport =

== Golf ==
- Sewsunker "Papwa" Sewgolum won the Dutch Open golf tournament for the second year in a row.

== See also ==
- 1960 in South Africa
- Timeline of South African sport
