= South African Class 61-000 =

Type of diesel-hydraulic locomotive

South African Classes 1-DH & 61-000 Rhodesia Railways Class DH1
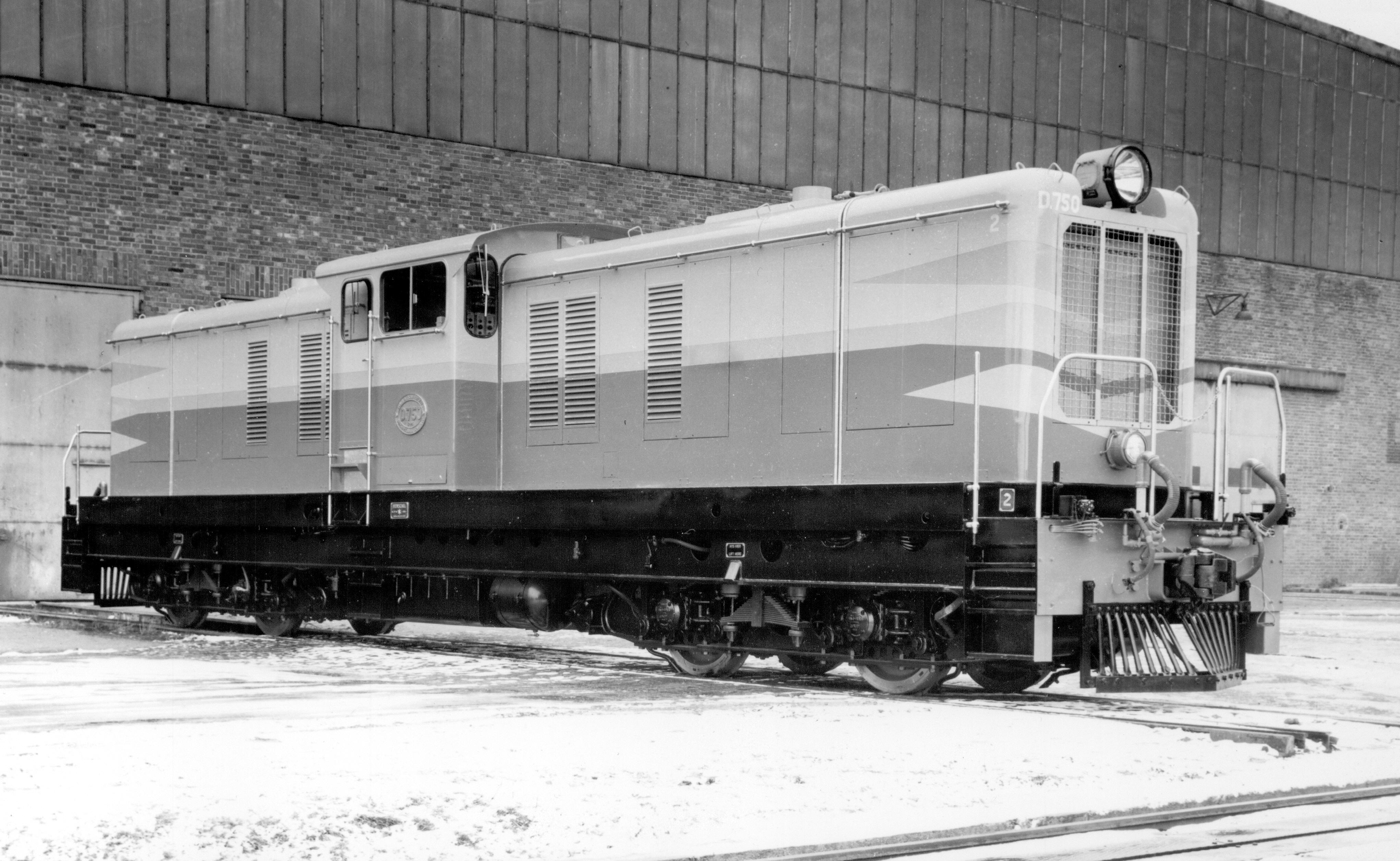
- No. D750, later no. 61-006, Kassel, Germany, c. 1958
Type and origin
- Power type: Diesel-hydraulic
- Designer: Henschel & Son
- Builder: Henschel & Son
- Serial number: 29745-29751
- Model: DH-1420
- Build date: 1958
- Total produced: 7
Specifications
- Configuration
  - AAR: B-B
  - UIC: B′B′
  - Commonwealth: B-B
- Gauge: 3 ft 6 in (1,067 mm) Cape gauge
- Wheel diameter: 1,054 mm (41.5 in)
- Wheelbase: 11,608 mm (38 ft 1.0 in)
  - Bogie: 2,184 mm (7 ft 2.0 in)
- Pivot centres: 9,423 mm (30 ft 11.0 in)
- Length
  - Over couplers: 16,551 mm (54 ft 3.6 in)
  - Over beams: 15,507 mm (50 ft 10.5 in)
- Width: 3,004 mm (9 ft 10.3 in)
- Height: 3,948 mm (12 ft 11.4 in)
- Axle load: 18,900 kg (41,700 lb)
- Adhesive weight: 75,600 kg (166,700 lb)
- Loco weight: 75,600 kg (166,700 lb)
- Fuel type: Diesel
- Fuel capacity: 2,730 litres (600 imp gal)
- Lubricant cap.: 546 litres (120 imp gal)
- Sandbox cap.: Eight 0.13 m^{3} (4.6 cu ft) boxes
- Electric system/s: Type 4 WHHP 315 batteries * 64 V, 32 Cells, 280 amp/hr * 2 Delco & Bendix starters
- Prime mover: GM-EMD type 6/567C
- RPM range: 835 maximum
- Engine type: 2-stroke diesel
- Generator: 10 kW (13 hp) 80 V 800 to 2,400 rpm (Auxiliary)
- Cylinders: 2 x V6
- Cylinder size: 215.9 mm (8.5 in) bore 254 mm (10.0 in) stroke
- Transmission: Voith Type L306r, 3 torque converters, using Cardan shafts
- MU working: 3 maximum
- Loco brake: Westinghouse
- Train brakes: Air & vacuum
- Couplers: AAR knuckle
Performance figures
- Maximum speed: 88.5 km/h (55.0 mph)
- Power output: 2 x 491 kW (658 hp)
- Tractive effort
  - Starting: 197.2 kN (44,300 lbf) @ 9.6 km/h (6.0 mph)
  - 1 hour: 148 kN (33,000 lbf) @ 16 km/h (9.9 mph)
  - Continuous: 99.1 kN (22,300 lbf) @ 24 km/h (15 mph)
- Brakeforce: 77% @ 393 kPa (57.0 psi)
Career
- Operators: South African Railways; Rhodesia Railways; National Railways of Zimbabwe; Zimbabwe Iron and Steel Company
- Class: SAR Class 1-DH, Class 61-000; RR & NRZ Class DH1
- Number in class: 7
- Numbers: SAR 61-001 to 61-007 (ex D745 to D751); RR & NRZ 3101-3106
- Delivered: 1959
- First run: 1959
- Withdrawn: 1971
- Disposition: 6 sold to Rhodesia Railways

The South African Railways Class 61-000 of 1959 was a diesel-hydraulic locomotive.

Between May and July 1959, the South African Railways placed seven Class 1-DH Henschel type DH-1420 diesel-hydraulic locomotives in service to also gain experience with other forms of diesel motive power than diesel-electric. The locomotives were later reclassified to Class 61-000. In 1971, six of them were sold to Rhodesia Railways.

== Manufacturer ==
The Class 61-000 type DH-1420 diesel-hydraulic locomotive was designed and built for the South African Railways (SAR) by Henschel & Son in Kassel, Germany. Upon delivery, the locomotives were designated Class 1-DH and numbered in the range from D745 to D751 in the non-steam locomotive number range which had hitherto been used almost exclusively for electric locomotives, the exceptions being the Class DS, Class DS1 and Class 1-DE diesel-electric locomotives. After the SAR adopted a new classification and numbering system for diesel-powered locomotives upon the arrival of the Class 32-000 later in 1959, they were reclassified as the Class 61-000 and renumbered in the range from 61-001 to 61-007.

The Class 1-DH was acquired a year after the SAR had acquired its first diesel-electric locomotives to be built in quantity, the Class 1-DE which had entered service in 1958 and which was later reclassified to Class 31-000. At the time, the SAR was still making extensive use of steam traction and increasing use of electric traction. Its first mainline diesel traction acquisitions were therefore the diesel-electric Class 1-DE and diesel-hydraulic Class 1-DH to gain experience with both forms of diesel motive power.

== Diesel-hydraulic transmission ==
The more commonly used diesel-electric locomotive makes use of a diesel engine prime mover to propel either a generator (DC) or an alternator (AC) to generate electric power, which is then used to propel axle-hung electric traction motors, one per powered axle, to drive the locomotive wheels. It therefore works on the same general principle as a regular electric locomotive, the main difference being that it generates its own electric power instead of collecting it from an external supply such as overhead catenary or a third rail.

Diesel-hydraulic locomotives, on the other hand, use hydrokinetic transmission, also known as hydrodynamic transmission, in the form of torque converters to transmit power from prime mover to wheels.

== Characteristics ==
The Class 61-000 was a centre-cab locomotive which was powered by two General Motors Electro-Motive Division (GM-EMD) type 6/567C V6 prime movers, each with a Voith type L306r triple-torque converter transmission and each driving the wheels of one bogie. Power was transferred to the axles through drive shafts. Unlike diesel-electric locomotives where each axle is driven by its own traction motor, individual wheel-slip was not possible on the Class 61-000 since each bogie's two axles were interconnected through the drive shafts.

The cab had two control stands and since it was possible to start the six prime movers of three multiple-unit consisted locomotives from one engine cab, each control stand had six engine start buttons and six engine stop buttons. The electrical system was very complicated and unreliable, which eventually led to the locomotives being completely rewired in 1963.

The diesel-hydraulics were acquired to enable a direct comparison with the Class 31-000 General Electric-built diesel-electrics, but these Henschel machines did not perform as well. Even though they had a higher nominal starting tractive effort of 197.2 kilonewtons (44,300 pounds-force) than the 181 kilonewtons (41,000 pounds-force) of the diesel-electrics, they were plagued with overheating and other problems. This was disappointing given the acknowledged success of diesel-hydraulic traction in Germany. Although it has been surmised that the much higher ambient temperatures in South Africa might have been a factor, an improved cooling system could probably have solved that if it had been the main problem.

== Service ==
=== South African Railways ===
From its establishment in late 1958, the new diesel depot in Germiston provided most of the power on goods trains and some passenger trains going south from the Reef to Volksrust and Kroonstad. Upon delivery, the Class 61-000 joined the Class 31-000 there. They were initially tried on passenger trains, but after a failure at Standerton due to overheating while working the Trans-Natal Express, they were taken off further passenger work and used on goods trains only. They were not successful in mainline goods working either and in the early 1960s the new diesel-hydraulics were mostly confined to shunting work in yards around Braamfontein.

The Class 61-000s spent their entire SAR working lives stationed at the Germiston diesel depot. One of them, no. 61-006} was involved in a head-on collision at Kaserne on 8 October 1966 and was eventually scrapped at the Koedoespoort workshops in Pretoria in September 1968. Problems with cracked axles eventually resulted in the rest of the fleet being staged for repairs in 1967.

=== Rhodesia Railways ===
In 1971, the remaining six locomotives were sold to Rhodesia Railways (RR), later renamed the National Railways of Zimbabwe (NRZ), where they became the RR Class DH1 and were renumbered in the range from 3101 to 3106.

=== ZISCO ===
They were eventually resold to the Zimbabwe Iron and Steel Company steel works at KweKwe in Zimbabwe. Most, if not all, were scrapped by 2001.

== Liveries ==
Like the Class 31-000 diesel-electrics, the locomotives were delivered in a livery that displayed the colours of the South African flag, white on the upper half and blue on the lower half, separated by an orange stripe on the sides and orange whiskers on the ends. They had black running boards, red buffer beams and black cowcatchers. From 1960 this livery gradually began to be replaced by Gulf Red with yellow side-stripes on the hoods and a yellow V on each end.

== Works numbers ==
The Class 61-000 builder's works numbers, renumbering upon reclassification and sale are listed in the table.

Class 61-000 works numbers and renumbering
SAR 1-DH no.	SAR 61-000 no.	Henschel works no.	RR & NRZ no.
D745	61-001	29745	3101
D746	61-002	29746	3102
D747	61-003	29747	3103
D748	61-004	29748	3104
D749	61-005	29749	3105
D750	61-006	29750	
D751	61-007	29751	3106

== Illustration ==
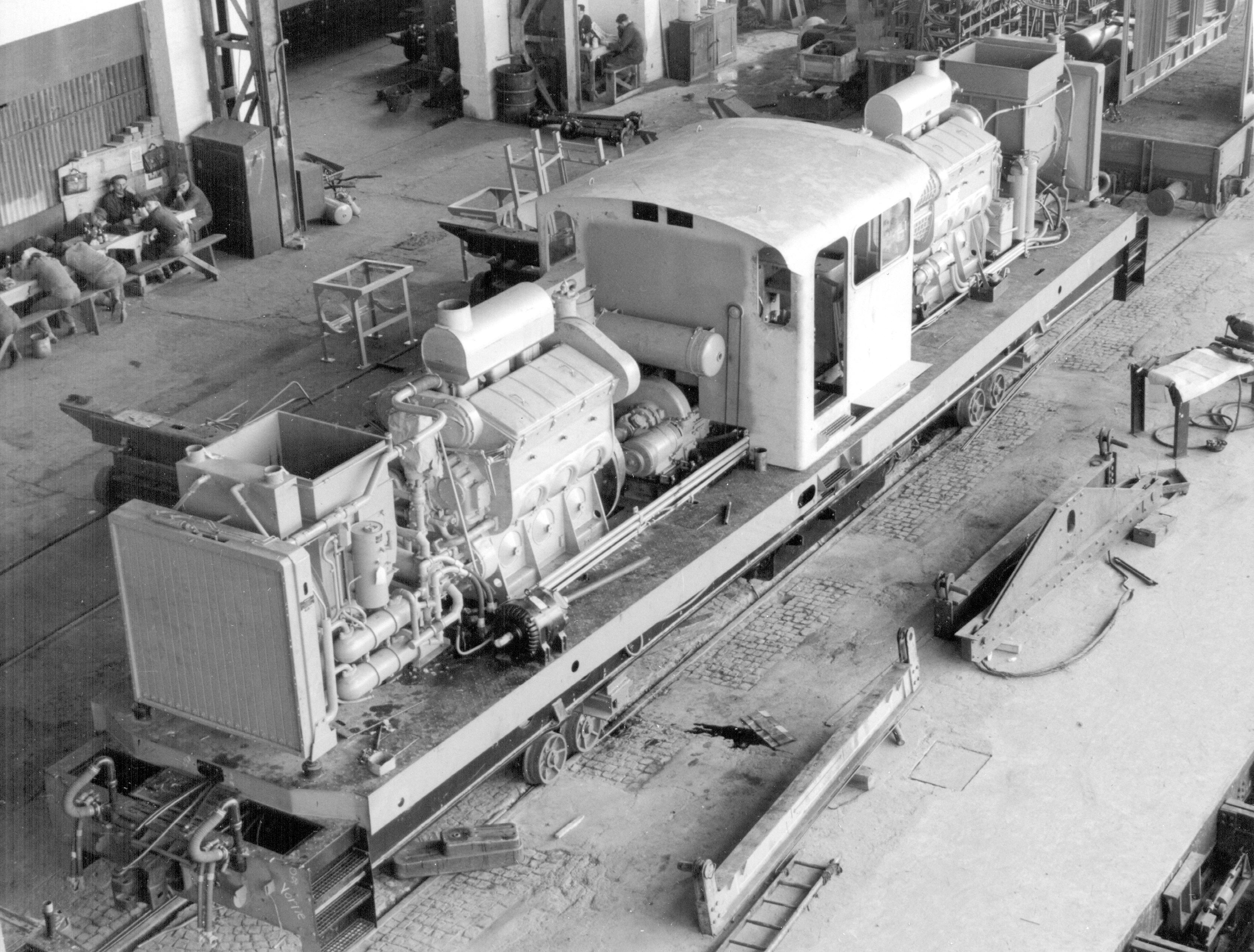
No. D750, later no. 61-006, under construction at Henschel's plant at Kassel, Germany, 1958
