= Internal Security Act, 1982 =

Security legislation in apartheid-era South Africa

Parliament of South Africa
- Long title: Act to provide for the security of the State and the maintenance of law and order; and to provide for matters connected therewith.
- Citation: Act No. 74 of 1982
- Enacted by: Parliament of South Africa
- Assented to: 1 June 1982
- Commenced: 2 July 1982
- Repealed: various dates from 31 July 1991 to 20 May 2005
- Administered by: Minister of Law and Order, Minister of Justice

Repeals
- Suppression of Communism Act, 1950; Unlawful Organizations Act, 1960; Terrorism Act, 1967

Repealed by
- Internal Security and Intimidation Amendment Act, 1991; Abolition of Restrictions on Free Political Activity Act, 1993; Regulation of Gatherings Act, 1993; Protection of Constitutional Democracy against Terrorist and Related Activities Act, 2004
- Status: Repealed

The Internal Security Act, 1982 (Act No. 74 of 1982) was an act of the Parliament of South Africa that consolidated and replaced various earlier pieces of security legislation, including the Suppression of Communism Act, 1950, parts of the Riotous Assemblies Act, 1956, the Unlawful Organizations Act, 1960 and the Terrorism Act, 1967. It gave the apartheid government broad powers to ban or restrict organisations, publications, people and public gatherings, and to detain people without trial. The Act was passed as a consequence of the recommendations of the Rabie Commission, which had enquired into the state of security legislation.

It took over from the Suppression of Communism Act as the basis for serving banning orders on people. It also provided for house arrest.

Most of the Act was progressively repealed during the transitional period between 1990 (when in October, the last of five successive years of states of emergency concluded) and 1996, with the last remaining sections repealed in 2005.
