= Intimidation Act, 1982 =

South African law

Intimidation Act 72, 1982

Parliament of South Africa
- Long title: To prohibit certain forms of intimidation and to provide for matters connected therewith.
- Citation: Act No. 72 of 1982
- Enacted by: Parliament of South Africa
- Royal assent: 22 May 1982
- Commenced: 2 June 1982
- Administered by: Minister of Justice

Amended by
- Criminal Law Second Amendment Act 126, 1992; Internal Security and Intimidation Amendment Act 138, 1991
- Status: Amended

Intimidation Act, Act 72 of 1982 in South Africa (taking effect 2 June 1982) prohibited certain forms of intimidation and to provide for the consequences for such action.

== Content of the Act ==
The following is a brief description of the sections of the Intimidation Act:

Section 1.1

Defines that any person who without a lawful reason, compels or induces a person to do or abstain from an act or to cease a certain standpoint by assaulting, injuring or causes damage to that person or persons in any manner, threatens to kill, assault, injure or cause damage is guilty of the offence of intimidation. If found guilty, a R20,000 fine or imprisonment of no less than 10 years or both.

Section 1.2

It also defines the onus on the accused to prove a lawful reason for the offence described in section 1.1.

Section 2

Defined the repeal of Sections 10 to 15, inclusive, of the Riotous Assemblies Act, 1956, Act No. 17.

Section 3

Defined the name of the Act.

== South African Constitution ==
During October 2019, the South African Constitutional Court ruled that sections 1(1)(b) and 1(2) is unconstitutional and invalid.
