= Riotous Assemblies Act, 1956 =

Apartheid law in South Africa

Parliament of South Africa
- Long title: Act to consolidate the laws relating to riotous assemblies and the prohibition of the engendering of feelings of hostility between the European and non-European inhabitants of the Republic and matters incidental thereto, and the laws relating to certain offences.
- Citation: Act No. 17 of 1956
- Enacted by: Parliament of South Africa
- Royal assent: 8 March 1956
- Commenced: 16 March 1956
- Administered by: Minister of Justice

Amended by
- General Law Amendment Act 76 of 1962

Repealed by
- Intimidation Act, 1982; Internal Security Act, 1982
- Status: Repealed

The Riotous Assemblies Act, Act No 17 of 1956 in South Africa (taking effect 16 March) prohibited gatherings in open-air public places if the Minister of Justice considered they could endanger the public peace. Banishment was also included as a form of punishment.

This Act was passed in response to the Congress of the People, held at Kliptown, near Johannesburg, in June 1955. Following a call from the African National Congress (ANC), the South African Indian Congress, the South African Coloured People's Congress, the South African Congress of Democrats, and the South African Congress of Trade Unions, some 3,000 people met with the purpose of adopting the Freedom Charter. The Riotous Assemblies Act of 1956 was also used in the prosecution of the Treason Trial, the judicial outcome of the gathering having replaced Riotous Assemblies and Suppression of Communism Amendment Act, 1954.

== Content of the Act ==
The following is a brief description of the sections of the Riotous Assemblies Act:

Chapter I. Riotous Gatherings and Gatherings, Publications and Conduct Engendering Feelings of Hostility.
Section 1

Defined the meanings of common words within the Act.

Section 2

Defines the powers of the Magistrate to prohibit the planning and attendance of public gatherings in their district. It defines how the notice will be introduced to the district via newspapers, public notices or by verbally. Defines the power of the Minister to serve notice on individuals prohibiting their attendance. Defines the penalty of prison and or fine for those who having been found guilty of planning, attending, or addressing a prohibited gathering. Guilt also included inviting a person to attend in writing, orally and or arranging the event.

Section 3

Defines the powers of the Minister of Justice, through the Governor-General, to prohibit a publication that promotes the feelings of hostility between the races. A notice would be issued in the Government Gazette and newspapers prohibiting the publication and the distribution of the said item. That notice would then be sent to the editor of said publication or persons responsible. Fourteen days are given for the editor or person to contest the decision in a Supreme Court. Penalties for disobeying notice are discussed in Section 2. A person could also be banned, after noticed served by the Minister, for seven days from a stated location, removed by police if the person fails to comply, fines and penalties then applied. The notice that the Minister could withdraw at their pleasing, and a substance allowance paid to a person out of public funds when removed.

Section 4

Defines the Minister's obligations to supply to the person, served with a notice in Section 2 and 3, if requested by them in writing, the reasons why the notice was issued subject to when it won't be a detriment to public policy.

Section 5

Defines the Governor-General's powers to expel those not born inside the country if they are convicted of offences described in Section 2 and 3 but having them first detained as prohibited immigrants under the Immigrants Regulation Act, 1913.

Section 6

Defines the Magistrate's power to close public places to prevent illegal gatherings and the penalties when found guilty of contravening their notices.

Section 7

Defines the Police powers to disperse a prohibited gathering, the ranks, and the use of firearms and other force that is moderated and proportionate to the circumstances of the case, subject to Section 8.

Section 8

Defines the restriction as to the use of firearms or lethal weapons to disperse a prohibited gathering as one in which someone was killed or a threat to kill and injure someone or the damage or threat to damage property.

Section 9

Defines the savings of other laws applied to the dispersal of prohibited gatherings.

Chapter II. Offences in Relation to Employment and Public Safety.
Section 10

Defines it as an offence, the action of others in forcing others to take strike action from employment. Other offences include suggestions and threatening violence or injury on a person and relatives to strike; Intimidating said person; Hiding work equipment so work cannot take place.

Section 11

Defines it as an offence, to compel a person to join an organisation or association through means described in Section 10.

Section 12

Defines it as an offence, to be on work premises without the lawful right, where a person induces another to stop work or prevent them from returning to work.

Section 13

Defines it as an offence to verbally prevent a person from getting employment.

Section 14

Defines it as an offence if an employee of a local authority or company which that supplies any community with light, power, water and sanitary and transportation services, cause a service to be denied to the public if they break their conditions of service as in the case of a strike and or knowingly causes damage or injury to others. Employers of said organisations to ensure that their workplaces have this section posted. Penalties are listed for failing to post the notice and those defacing it as a fine or fourteen days imprisonment.

Section 15

Defines the penalties for being found guilty of offences described in Section 10, 11, 12, 13 and 14 as a fine and or six months imprisonment.

Section 16

Defines the Governor-Generals powers to take special precautions to maintain public order whenever he thinks to protect life and property with a proclamation in the Government Gazette prohibiting for such period as he may think fit the transportation of explosives and may limit or vary the conditions of any licences or permits held or to be issued under the Explosives Act, 1911.

Chapter III. Amendment of the Criminal Law
Section 17

Defines that a person shall be deemed to have committed the common law offence of incitement to public violence if, in any place whatever, he has acted or conducted himself in such a manner, or has spoken or published such words, that it may be reasonably be expected that the natural and probable consequences of his act, conduct, speech or publication would, under the circumstances, be the commission of public violence by members of the public generally or by persons in whose presence the act or conduct took place or to whom the speech or publication was addressed.

Section 18

Defines that any person who attempts to commit any offence against a statute or a statutory regulation shall be guilty of an offence and, if no punishment is expressly provided thereby for such an attempt, be liable on conviction to the punishment to which a person convicted of committing that offence would be liable.

Section 19

Defines that the Minister is to report to Parliament within fourteen days the use of the Act against any public gathering, person, or publication and use of police to disperse prohibited gatherings.

Section 20

Defines the repeal of the laws, Riotous Assemblies and Criminal Law Amendment Act, 1914, Riotous Assemblies (Amendment) Act, 1930 and Riotous Assemblies and Suppression of Communism Amendment Act, 1954.

Section 21

Defined the name of the Act and when it comes into operation.

== Amendments ==
Section 2 of the Riotous Assemblies Act was amended by the General Law Amendment Act 76 of 1962 under Section 19 of the latter. Added to Section 2, sub-section 3, it extended the right of the Minister to serve notice on people via affixing it to the last known address and or through means of the Government Gazette as was his ability to prohibit gatherings etc. via the same publication. Added a new sub-section 5 to Section 2, defining that without the Minister's consent, no prohibited person's writing or utterances could be disseminated at gatherings by any means, except by court proceedings and, face one year jail sentence on conviction or up to two years after a second offence, subject to that prohibited person having been served a notice previously via the Government Gazette.

== Repealed ==
Sections 10 to 15, inclusive, of the Riotous Assemblies Act were repealed when the Intimidation Act, Act 72 of 1982 commenced on 2 June 1982. Sections 1 to 9 and 19 to 20, were repealed when the Internal Security Act, Act 74 of 1982 commenced on 9 June 1982.
