= Christine Barkhuizen le Roux =

South African poet and writer (1959–2020)

Christine Barkhuizen le Roux (18 November 1959 – 18 November 2020) was a South African Afrikaans writer of poems, novels and short stories. A graduate in English, Psychology and Theology of Stellenbosch University, she made her debut as a writer in 2000. Several of Le Roux's works have been included in Dutch publications as well as in Afrikaans anthologies and some were featured in published magazines and books.

== Early life and education ==
On 18 November 1959, Le Roux was born in Vryburg. She frequently moved places during her childhood as her father was a road construction worker. Le Roux was educated in Stellenbosch, and was encouraged to read by her teacher in primary school. She graduated from Stellenbosch University with a Bachelor of Arts degree in English, Psychology and Theology in 1980. Le Roux went on to graduate with a higher education diploma. She obtained an honors degree in Afrikaans and Dutch from the University of the Western Cape in 2002 and obtained a Master of Arts degree in Dutch poetry three years later. Le Roux's dissertation focused on the poetry of the Jewish-Dutch poet Judith Herzberg, which was authored under her study leader Wium van Zyl.

== Career ==
In 2000, she made her writing debut when her poetry collection Dimensie was published. The collection was praised by reviewers and readers. Le Roux followed this publication with multiple more books of poetry, short stories and novels. She authored the short story A Persian Fairy Tale in 2005 and it won second prize in the national short story competition LitNet's Best Prose Pieces of 2005. Le Roux wrote short stories for the magazine Insig. She published the short story collection Where Cake and Wine Misses in March 2006, and at the conclusion of August 2006, her second collection of poems Rosette was released.

From 2000 to 2006, several of Le Roux's poems were included in Dutch publications, as well as in Afrikaans anthologies, and some of her poems and short stories were featured in Tydskrif vir Letterkunde. Some of Le Roux's verses were included in the Groot verseboek, and one of her short stories, "Om te bêre", was included in Die grote Afrikaanse kortverhaalboek, which was compiled by Abraham de Vries. In 2010, she published Padmaker, which is about a complex relationship between the parent and child and generational impact. She began translating the works of Ingrid Vander Veken, Diane Broeckhoven and Griet Op de Beeck from Dutch into Afrikaans in the same year. In 2011, Le Roux published a short story collection What the Eye Has Seen and authored the novel Witness that was published the following year. She wrote the poetry volume Shadow Shadow published in 2015, with the novels Drieklawerblaar and My name is Prince, I sleep with the light on following in 2016 and 2019 respectively. Le Roux's works have also been included in 2019's Die nije Afrikaanse prosaboek and 2020's Vers en vrou.

== Personal life ==
She was married to her husband Bertus and had three children with him. Le Roux was also a painter. At the time of her death, she was residing in Barrydale in the Little Karoo. On 18 November 2020, she died at Life Bayview Hospital in Mossel Bay from an undisclosed illness.
