= Kenneth Segal =

Israeli industrial designer

Kenneth (Keni) Segal
- קֶנִי סֶגַל
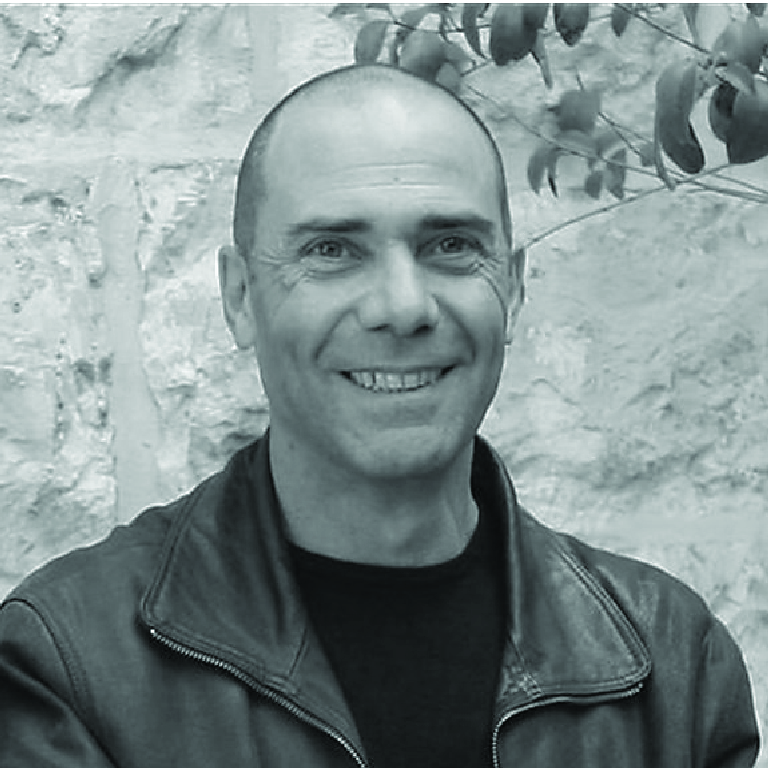
- Born: 4 April 1959 (age 67); Johannesburg, South Africa
- Occupations: Industrial designer and professor

Kenneth Segal (Hebrew: קֶנִי סֶגַל; born 4 April 1959) is an industrial designer and an educator. He is the founder and head of the department of industrial design at Shenkar College and Hadassah College in Jerusalem and an associate professor at Hadassah Academic College. He graduated in the 1990s from Bezalel Academy of Arts and Design and has been instrumental in revolutionizing the field of design and design education in Israel during the last two decades. Segal has co-founded and spearheaded PublicZone-Transportation Ltd, one of the leading design companies in Israel focusing and specializing in large-scale public transportation projects.

== Biography ==
Segal was born in Johannesburg, South Africa. He moved to Israel when he was 14 and was educated in Aloney Yitzhak boarding school in Giv'at Ada. At the age of 18, Segal joined the IDF's Paratroopers Brigade and served as an officer. Following his military service, he worked as a carpenter for several years until he graduated Bezalel Academy of Arts and Design in Jerusalem with honors (cum laude). In 2004, Segal graduated with Distinction the M.A. Design program at Middlesex University. He is currently an associate professor, teaching at the Department of Inclusive Design at Hadassah Academic College in Jerusalem.

== Professional career ==
Segal is a founding partner and CEO of PublicZone Transportation Ltd, a company which has been involved in projects at the national level. By designing high-quality products, solutions and programs, the company has affected the daily lives of hundreds of thousands of commuters daily, in projects such as the Jerusalem Light Rail system (140,000 ridership), Bus Rapid Transit System – “Metronit” in Haifa (95,000 Ridership), Jerusalem Bus Rapid Transit System (35,000 ridership). Developing modular systems for other transit systems in central Israel and Jerusalem together with public furniture for transport hubs and airports the company remains a leading innovator in the field of transportation design.

As a leading company PublicZone-Transportation Ltd has been involved in the development of design programs and information architecture solutions for other major transportation projects such as the Tel Aviv Red Line Bus Rapid Transit system of N.T.A and Tel Aviv Light Rail system. The company also planned TVM Shelters for High Grade Bus System in Haifa and designed the shelters for the Bus Interface Project of Israel Railway.

== Academic career ==
Segal is a senior lecturer at the department of Inclusive Design at Hadassah College in Jerusalem and a visiting lecturer at Ahmdebad's National Institute of Design (NID) in Gujarat, India. Segal has founded, built and headed two academic departments of Industrial Design in Israel, in Shenkar School of Engineering and Design and the Hadassah Academic College. In doing so, he has been one of the leading figures to define, mold and improve Israel's design education discipline. As an Academic Consultant Segal wrote the undergraduate academic program of industrial design for the WIZO Haifa Academic Center and consulted on quality control, program improvement and student acceptance policy to Bilgi University in Istanbul, Turkey. During his years of teaching, Segal has created various courses: design and collapsing societies, wood as a cultural material and more.

Segal's new book, co-written with Dr. Jonathan Ventura, titled "From Lucy to Bernini: New Perspectives of Design" is expected to be published in 2016 by Common Ground Publishing.

== Public arena ==
In the early years of 2000, Segal served on the steering committee for design at the ministry of trade and commerce and in 2005 under the direction of the Director General Mr. Raanan Dinur, wrote and developed a national program of design policy for the design sector in Israel of which many elements have been implemented.

In 2005, together with designer David Grossman, Segal co-founded the Israel Community of Designers, an elected professional membership organization, and served from 2005-2007 as Vice President and Chairman of the Chapter of Industrial Designers.

In an effort to improve the conditions and awareness of design in Jerusalem 2002-2007 Segal founded together with the curator of design at the Israel Museum, Alex Ward, the Jerusalem Design Forum an international platform for the discourse on design. The Jerusalem Design Forum hosted major international conferencesdesign with renowned lecturers drawing large audiences. In 2008 Segal initiated and founded the Jerusalem Center of Design and served as the CEO until 2010. The Center was responsible for the development of various impact programs aimed at helping design practitioners and studios develop viable businesses in the city of Jerusalem.

Judging committees:

Segal was a panel member in many design committees such as Prize for Art and Design by the Ministry of Education, Israel; Furniture Design Competition, Competition for Public Space Design of the Jerusalem City Center and NID Design Excellence – Industrial design of the Year Award in India.

He is currently a panel member in the Ministry of Trade and Commerce Panel for design project grants and Ot Haitsuv – an award for Design Excellence.

Exhibitions curating:

- Thinology by Ronen Kadushin at Periscope Design Gallery in Tel Aviv
- Pgam on Jewish Thought in Design Process at Hadassah College

Exhibitions designing:

- David the King by Scwebel at Yeshiva University Museum in Chelsea, New York
- Schwebel Exhibition at the Red House in Jerusalem in which the old winery was transformed into a gallery therefore the exhibition included interior design, graphic design and curating

Special projects:

Segal initiated and developed the concept, vision and mission of the Jerusalem Design Week and Jerusalem Center of Design, as well as support programs for young designers interested in starting a design practice of their own by giving incentives that enable the establishment of new businesses.

== Honors and awards ==
2006 – Finalist of the Adi Foundation – Chaim Mudachim, a chair design inspired by a text written by Gershom Shalom.

1998 – The Polanski Scholarship for postgraduate studies – for Mopod, a mobile stander for handicapped children.

1997 – First prize of the Israel Furniture Designers National competition – for laser furniture design.
