= Dan Roodt =

South African author, publisher, and commentator

Daniel Francois Roodt
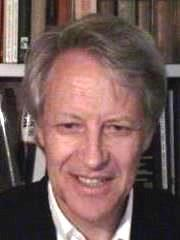
- Born: 26 May 1957 (age 69); Springs, Transvaal, Union of South Africa
- Occupations: Activist, literary critic, writer
- Website: roodt.org

Daniel Francois Roodt (born 26 May 1957) is a South African author, publisher, and commentator.

== Early life and education ==
Roodt was born in the mining town of Springs, east of Johannesburg, South Africa. He completed his schooling in Johannesburg, after which he enrolled for a Bachelor's degree at the University of Witwatersrand. Roodt has six degrees, including a PhD from the University of the Witwatersrand in Afrikaans, obtained with a thesis on the works of John Miles in 1994.

== Career ==
Roodt lectured at the University of Durban-Westville for a while, and in 1985 left South Africa for France to avoid conscription in the South African Defence Force.

Times LIVE said that in the 1980s, Roodt was an anti-establishment anarchist, but that now "he is branded a right-wing reactionary" for his "vehement anti-ANC essays". Two of his literary works had been banned by the South African government in 1980, a time of strict censorship.

After returning to South Africa in 1992, Roodt worked for Citibank until 1999, and in 2000 he co-founded PRAAG (Pro-Afrikaanse Aksiegroep, or Pro-Afrikaans Action Group), which describes itself as an extra-parliamentary movement devoted to the rights of Afrikaners. PRAAG also has a publishing division, which has published some of his recent works. Roodt has contributed articles to Focus, the journal of the liberal Helen Suzman Foundation, columns to American Renaissance, a white nationalist magazine, various scientific or academic journals in South Africa as well as a host of articles in South African newspapers. He has also appeared on television and radio talk shows in South Africa.

In May 2011 Roodt stood for the Freedom Front Plus during the municipal elections as a candidate in Johannesburg, but was not elected.

Roodt is the deputy leader and spokesperson of South African right-wing political party Front Nasionaal formed in late 2013 which promotes separatism and Afrikaner self-determination. The Sunday newspaper Rapport reported on 8 February 2015 that Roodt had been "voted out of the party" without him being aware of it. He was quoted in the article as saying that "he would henceforth be devoting his energy to his publishing company, Praag... I am disillusioned with Afrikaner politics. I am finished with Afrikaner politics."

== Activism ==
Roodt has strong views on the preservation of Afrikaans and Afrikaner culture, which has led to some controversy in the South African media. He maintains a blog and the PRAAG website, commenting on issues in South Africa. Roodt also regularly writes letters regarding political matters to various South African newspapers and the literary e-zine LitNet.

== Writing ==
Roodt's first novel, Sonneskyn en Chevrolet (Taurus, 1980), is an anti-establishment commentary on South African society (and specifically Afrikaner society) of that time. His only published volume of poetry to date, Kommas uit 'n boomzol (Uitgewery Pannevis, 1980), structurally parodies Komas uit 'n bamboesstok (Human & Rousseau, 1979), a volume of poetry by the Afrikaans poet D.J. Opperman. Afrikaans literary critic John Kannemeyer asserts that there is 'no one poem of any intrinsic value' in Kommas uit 'n boomzol, and similarly views Roodt's subsequent prose work Twee sinne (Taurus, 1985).

Roodt's first publication after Twee sinne is a critical essay on the South African Truth and Reconciliation Commission (TRC) entitled Om die Waarheidskommissie te vergeet ('Forgetting the Truth Commission', 2001). This would be PRAAG's first publication of one of Roodt's works. In 2004, PRAAG published the novel Moltrein, which is about a promising musician who leaves South Africa during the 1980s to avoid military service in the South African Defence Force.

In 2005 Roodt released The Scourge of the ANC (PRAAG), a critique of the ANC, and also of the former South African government under leadership of FW de Klerk. The following year, Aweregs (PRAAG, 2006), another collection of political essays, was released. Regarding Aweregs, Venter notes that if the ultimate aim of the book is

to demonstrate the author's pessimism regarding Africa, the African National Congress (ANC), "the new" South Africa, and supporters of the idea that Afrikaans can only survive by developing multilingualism in South Africa, then Roodt's vision succeeds. But it is a limited and distressing vision.

In 2015, Roodt published an essay Raiders of the Lost Empire: South Africa's English Identity (PRAAG) in which he "explores the country's 'new' English identity which is founded on the old colonial identity of the nineteenth century when the redcoats invaded the Cape of Good Hope."

== Personal life ==
Roodt currently lives with his wife, Karin (née Bredenkamp), and their three children in Johannesburg, South Africa.
