= Ada Booyens =

South African race walker

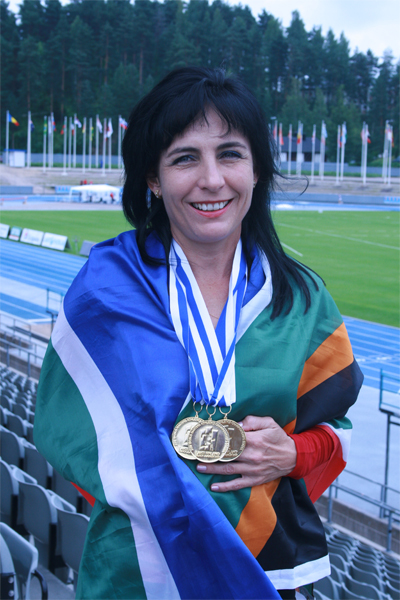

Personal information
- Nationality: South African
- Born: Ada Georgina Reichert

Sport
- Sport: Race walking

Ada Booyens (born Ada Georgina Reichert on 5 December 1961) is a South African race walker. She is a six-time World Masters Champion and holds the African record for the indoor 3000 metres walk event.

Booyens was born in the small town of Barkly West in Northern Cape Province. After school she attended teachers college in Bloemfontein, qualified there as a primary teacher, and later married and had three children. Her daughter, Riandi, became South Africa's first ever Primary School Champion in the race walk at 12 years old. Over the next few years, her two younger children, Christo and Thinus, also won the primary schools title.

Booyens was suffering from severe depression when she met race walking coach Carl Meyer. He encouraged her to take up the same sport as her children and coached her over the telephone. Two months later he saw her race walking and immediately recognised a massive talent. He started to coach her to compete in national events and she soon won against long established South African Masters Champions. She had not participated in any competitive sport until 2006, aged 45.

Booyens won her first international gold medal in France in 2008 in the masters 10 km walk event. She became a South African National Masters Champion in the 5 km and 10 km events later that year and retained both titles in 2009. In the 2009 World Masters Athletics Championships in Lahti, Finland she took 3 gold medals in the 5 km, 10 km and the team event on the 10 km race. She was nominated as one of the Best World Masters athletes for 2009.

At the 2010 World Indoor Championships in Kamloops she walked away with two gold medals in the indoor 3000 m (15:57.06) and 10 km (54:23.30) race walk events. The 3000 m time was an African indoor record for the event.

== Coach ==
Carl Meyer is a very experienced Race Walker since 1972 and an IAAF level IV Race walking coach, serving the race walking sport for more than 37 years. Currently he holds the oldest standing South African athletic record and he also won a silver medal in the 3000m event at the World Masters Indoor Championships in France in 2008, as well as a bronze medal at the World Masters Athletic Championships in Italy in 2007.
