= Ivan Wingreen =

South African cricketer (1961–2014)

Personal information
- Full name: Ivan Michael Wingreen
- Born: 23 June 1961; Cape Town, Western Cape
- Died: 11 May 2014 (aged 52)
- Batting: Right-handed
- Bowling: NA

Domestic team information
- Years: Team
- 1983–1987: Western Province

Ivan Michael Wingreen (23 June 1961 – 11 May 2014) was a South African cricketer. Born in Cape Town, Cape Province he played first-class cricket for Western Province in a career that lasted from 1983 to 1987.

Wingreen played 22 first-class matches for Western Province B. His highest score was 103 against Eastern Province B in 1985–86. He also played three List A cricket matches in 1984–85, two for Western Province, one for Western Province B.

== Personal life ==
Wingreen was married and had two daughters. He died after an illness in Australia. He had been living there for several years and had been suffering from a brain tumor.
