= South African Class 5E, Series 3 =

Class of South African electric locomotives

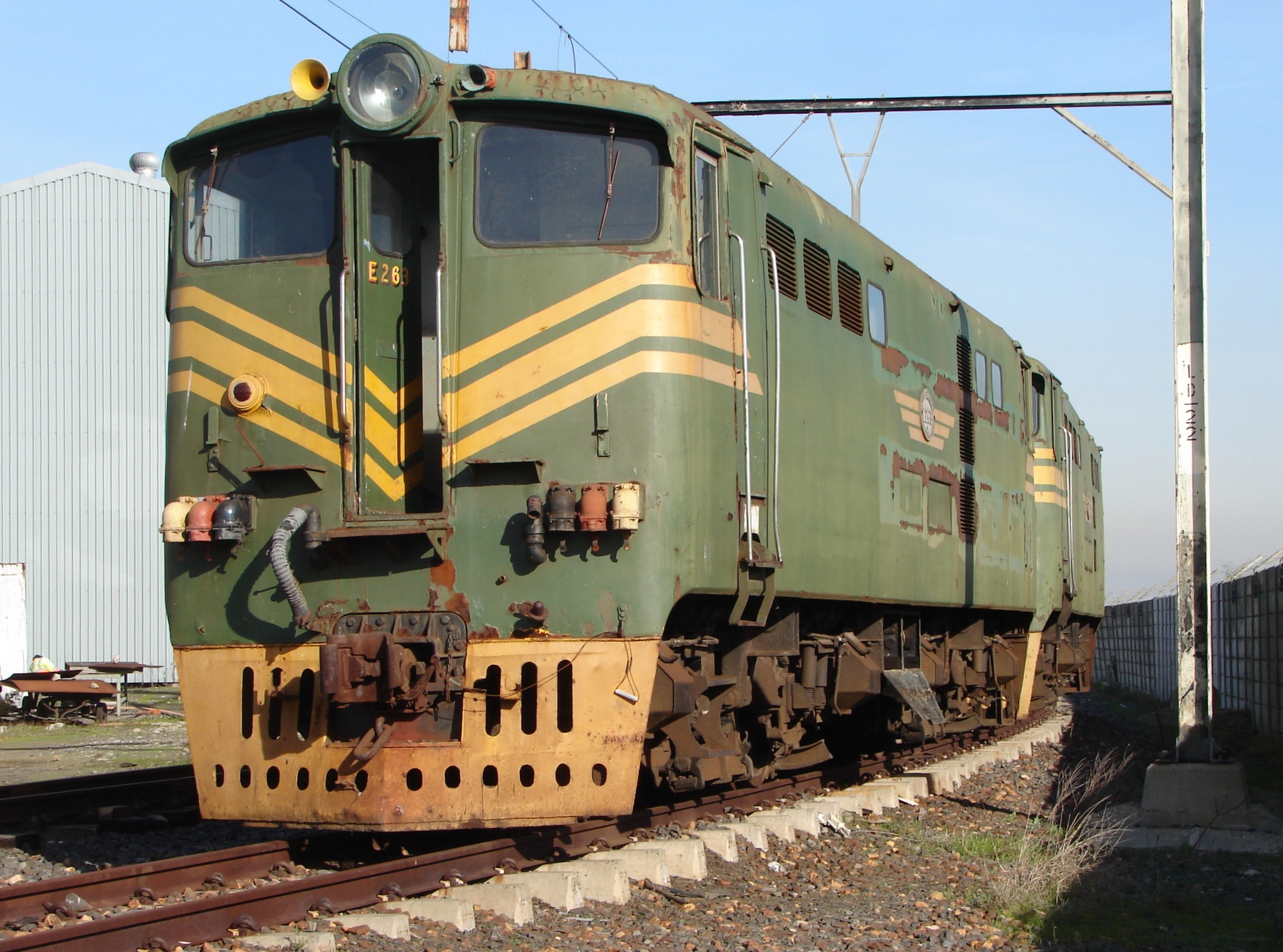
- No. E564, incorrectly numbered as Series 1 no. E263 in preservation, Bellville, 4 July 2017
Type and origin
- Power type: Electric
- Designer: English Electric
- Builder: Vulcan Foundry
- Serial number: EE 2544-2598, VF E209-E263
- Model: EE 5E
- Build date: 1958
- Total produced: 55
Specifications
- Configuration
  - AAR: B-B
  - UIC: Bo'Bo'
  - Commonwealth: Bo-Bo
- Gauge: 3 ft 6 in (1,067 mm) Cape gauge
- Wheel diameter: 1,219 mm (48.0 in)
- Wheelbase: 11,279 mm (37 ft 1/16 in)
  - Bogie: 3,430 mm (11 ft 3 1/16 in)
- Pivot centres: 7,849 mm (25 ft 9 in)
- Panto shoes: 6,972 mm (22 ft 10 1/2 in)
- Length
  - Over couplers: 15,494 mm (50 ft 10 in)
  - Over body: 14,631 mm (48 ft 0 in)
- Width: 2,896 mm (9 ft 6 in)
- Height
  - Pantograph: 4,089 mm (13 ft 5 in)
  - Body height: 3,937 mm (12 ft 11 in)
- Axle load: 21,591 kg (47,600 lb)
- Adhesive weight: 86,364 kg (190,400 lb)
- Loco weight: 86,364 kg (190,400 lb)
- Electric system/s: 3 kV DC catenary
- Current pickup(s): Pantographs
- Traction motors: Four EE 529
  - Rating 1 hour: 377 kW (506 hp)
  - Continuous: 325 kW (436 hp)
- Gear ratio: 18:67
- Loco brake: Air & Regenerative
- Train brakes: Vacuum
- Couplers: AAR knuckle
Performance figures
- Maximum speed: 97 km/h (60 mph)
- Power output
  - 1 hour: 1,508 kW (2,022 hp)
  - Continuous: 1,300 kW (1,700 hp)
- Tractive effort
  - Starting: 200 kN (45,000 lbf)
  - 1 hour: 128 kN (29,000 lbf)
  - Continuous: 104 kN (23,000 lbf)
Career
- Operators: South African Railways; Spoornet; MetroRail; Driefontein
- Class: Class 5E
- Number in class: 55
- Numbers: E536-E590
- Nicknames: Balstamper
- Delivered: 1958-1959
- First run: 1958

The South African Railways Class 5E, Series 3 of 1958 was an electric locomotive.

In 1958 and 1959, the South African Railways placed fifty-five Class 5E, Series 3 electric locomotives with a Bo-Bo wheel arrangement in mainline service.

== Manufacturer ==
Like the Series 2, all the Class 5E, Series 3 locomotives were built for the South African Railways (SAR) by Vulcan Foundry (VF), subcontracted by English Electric (EE) who had designed the locomotive and supplied the electric components. They were built in 1958 and entered service in 1958 and 1959, numbered in the range from E536 to E590.

The number range of the Series 3 locomotives did not follow directly on that of the Series 2, since the Class 5E1, Series 1 and the Class ES locomotives were allocated most of the numbers in between. Twelve numbers, E499, E513, E514 and those in the range from E527 to E535 were never allocated.

== Orientation ==
These dual cab locomotives had a roof access ladder on one side only, just to the right of the cab access door. The roof access ladder end was marked as the no. 2 end. A corridor along the centre of the locomotive connected the cabs, which were identical except that Cab 2 was where the handbrake was located.

== Service ==
Crews found the Class 5E to give a rough ride, which soon earned it the nickname Balstamper. The successor Class 5E1 with its new design bogies gave a smoother ride.

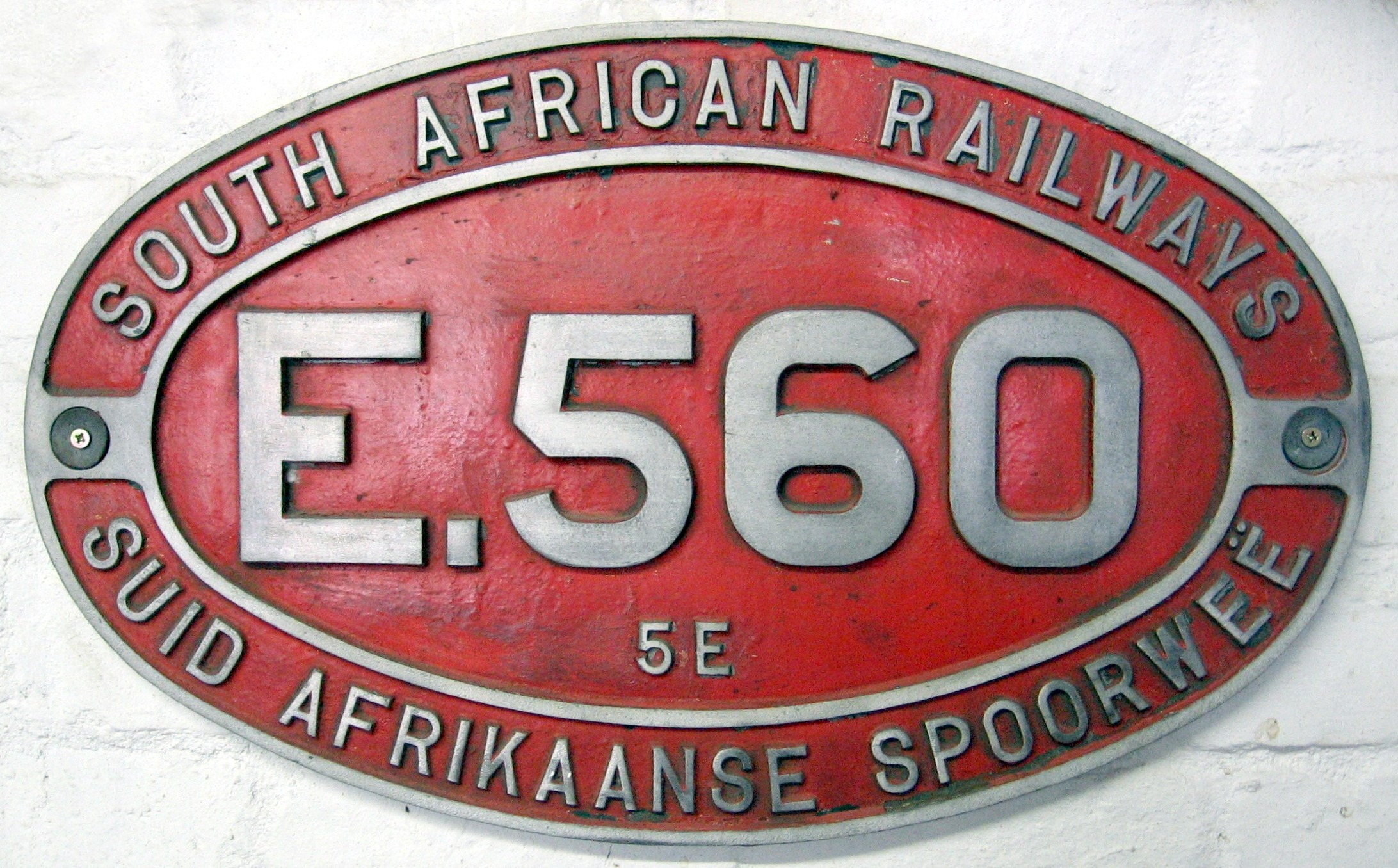
Builder's plate

The Class 5E family entered service on the Natal mainline between Durban and Johannesburg and eventually served almost country-wide as electrification was completed on more mainlines. In 1960, sixty units of the Class 5E family were allocated to the Witbank section upon completion of its electrification. In December 1961, twelve of them were replaced by Class 32-000 diesel-electric locomotives and transferred to the newly electrified Touws River-Beaufort West section. More followed to replace the Class 25 condensers that were being transferred from that section to Beaconsfield in Kimberley at the time.

After withdrawal from service, only one Series 3 locomotive, no. E576, was sold into industrial service. It went to the Driefontein gold mine near Carletonville where, for an unknown reason, it was given the number plates from Series 2 no. E343 which had also been acquired by Driefontein.

Numbers E563 and E590 were transferred to MetroRail, later part of the Passenger Rail Agency of South Africa, for use as shunting locomotives at the MetroRail Depot in Salt River, Cape Town. They still survive, staged out of service at Salt River.

== Liveries ==
The locomotives were delivered in a bottle green and yellow whiskers livery with red cowcatchers. Beginning c. 1960, a Gulf Red and yellow whiskers livery gradually replaced the green and yellow.

With both liveries, the locomotives all had red cowcatchers except in the Cape Western region, where units based at the Bellville Depot could often be identified by their yellow cowcatchers.

Some selected electric and diesel-electric locomotives were painted blue for use with the Blue Train, but without altering the layout of the paint scheme. During the late 1970s numbers E562 to E569 were painted blue with yellow whiskers for use on the Blue Train between Cape Town and Beaufort West in the Cape Western region. In the early 1990s no. E564 was renumbered E263 to represent a Series 1 locomotive and repainted in SAR green and yellow whiskers for use on tourist excursion trains.

MetroRail's shunting locomotive no. E590 was later painted in MetroRail's grey and yellow suburban livery.

== Preservation ==
One of the 5E Series 3's is currently preserved in the meantime.

- Class 5E E564 incorrectly numbered as Series 1 E263 in preservation this unit is preserved at Bellville Loco Depot.

== Works numbers ==
The EE and VF works numbers of the Class 5E, Series 3 and their known disposal are shown in the table.

Class 5E, Series 3
Loco no.	EE works no.	VF works no.	Sold to
E536	2544	E209	
E537	2545	E210	
E538	2546	E211	
E539	2547	E212	
E540	2548	E213	
E541	2549	E214	
E542	2550	E215	
E543	2551	E216	
E544	2552	E217	
E545	2553	E218	
E546	2554	E219	
E547	2555	E220	
E548	2556	E221	
E549	2557	E222	
E550	2558	E223	
E551	2559	E224	
E552	2560	E225	
E553	2561	E226	
E554	2562	E227	
E555	2563	E228	
E556	2564	E229	
E557	2565	E230	
E558	2566	E231	
E559	2567	E232	
E560	2568	E233	
E561	2569	E234	
E562	2570	E235	
E563	2571	E236	Metro
E564	2572	E237	Preserved (incorrectly numbered E263)
E565	2573	E238	
E566	2574	E239	
E567	2575	E240	
E568	2576	E241	
E569	2577	E242	
E570	2578	E243	
E571	2579	E244	
E572	2580	E245	
E573	2581	E246	
E574	2582	E247	
E575	2583	E248	
E576	2584	E249	Dries
E577	2585	E250	
E578	2586	E251	
E579	2587	E252	
E580	2588	E253	
E581	2589	E254	
E582	2590	E255	
E583	2591	E256	
E584	2592	E257	
E585	2593	E258	
E586	2594	E259	
E587	2595	E260	
E588	2596	E261	
E589	2597	E262	
E590	2598	E263	Metro

== Illustration ==
The main picture shows no. E590 in MetroRail livery, while the rest of the pictures serve to illustrate some of the other liveries in which Series 3 locomotives served.

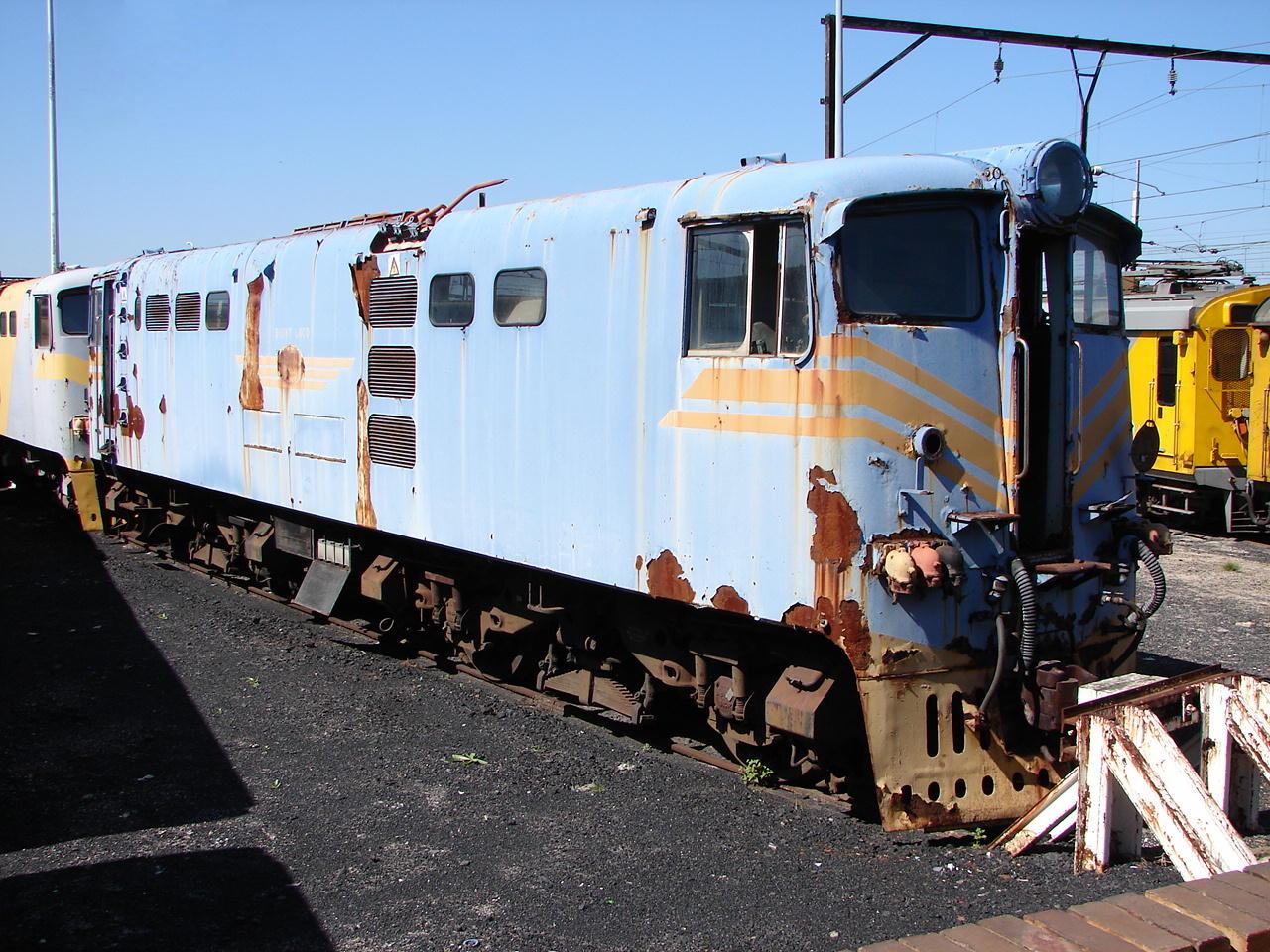
No. E563 in SAR Blue Train livery, Metro Depot, Salt River, 10 September 2007

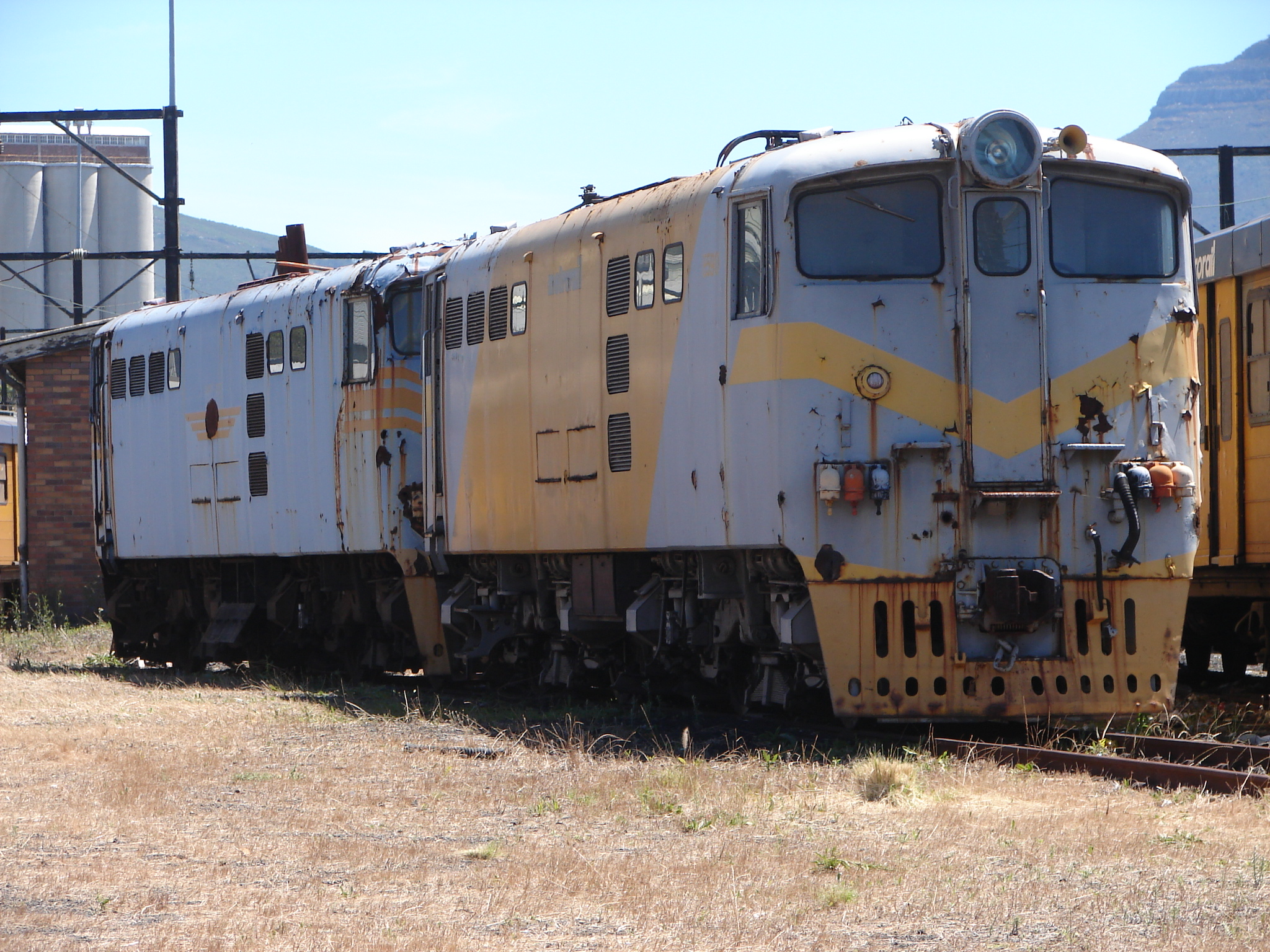
No. E590 in MetroRail livery, Salt River MetroRail Depot, 6 November 2014

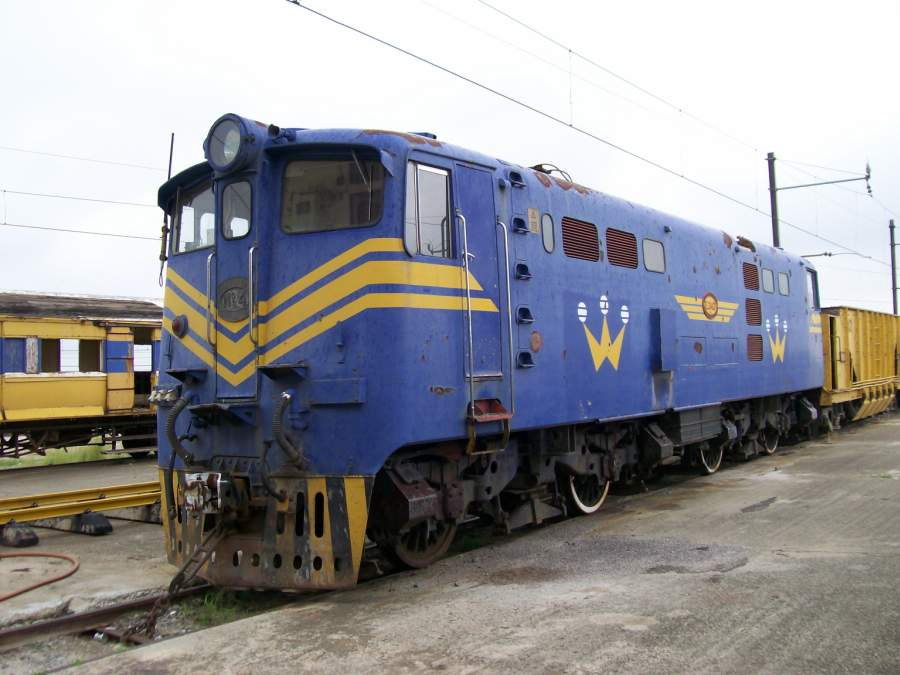
Driefontein gold mine's no. 4, ex SAR no. E576, Carletonville, 21 January 2009
