= Unlawful Organizations Act, 1960 =

Parliament of South Africa
- Long title: Act to empower the Governor-General, with a view to the safety of the public or the maintenance of public order, by proclamation in the Gazette to declare the Pan Africanist Congress and the African National Congress and certain other organizations to be unlawful organizations, to amend the Riotous Assemblies Act, 1956, and to provide for other incidental matters.
- Citation: Act No. 34 of 1960
- Enacted by: Parliament of South Africa
- Royal assent: 7 April 1960
- Commenced: 7 April 1960
- Repealed: 2 July 1982
- Administered by: Minister of Justice

Repealed by
- Internal Security Act, 1982

Related legislation
- Suppression of Communism Act, 1950
- Status: Repealed

The Unlawful Organizations Act No 34 of 1960 (commenced 7 April 1960) allowed the apartheid government of South Africa to declare unlawful any organizations deemed to threaten public order or the safety of the public. This legislation was enacted within a few weeks of 1960's Sharpeville Massacre. The Pan Africanist Congress (PAC) and African National Congress (ANC) were immediately declared unlawful. Nelson Mandela recorded in his autobiography, "We were now, all of us, outlaws". The Indemnity Act that followed legislatively indemnified supporters of the apartheid regime from any wrongdoing connected to the massacre.

== Content of the Act ==
The following is a brief description of the sections of the Unlawful Organizations Act:

Section 1

Defined that the Pan Africanist Congress and the ANC could be declared an unlawful organisation by the Governor-general, without giving them notice, via a proclamation in the Government Gazette. Defined that any other organisation deemed unlawful organisation by the Governor-general could be banned. Defined that the banning was for twelve months and could extended after that time-period for another twelve months. Defined that the Governor-general could unban an organisation via the Government Gazette.

Section 2

Defines the use of certain sections of Suppression of Communism Act, 1950 to apply to organisations proclaimed as unlawful.

Section 3

Defined that any organisation that was proclaimed as being banned, that proclamation would be reported to parliament within fourteen days or with fourteen days of parliaments recommencement.

Section 4

Defined that section 15 of the Riotous Assemblies Act, 1956, substituted the word "liable" with "“to the penalties prescribed in section two of the Criminal Law Amendment Act, 1953 (Act No. 8 of 1953)” and that is applied from 28 March 1960.

Section 5

Defined that the Act applied in South-West Africa.

Section 6

Defined the name of the Act.

== Amended ==
Section 2 of this act was amended in section 20 of the General Law Amendment Act No. 76 of 1962.

== Repeal ==
The Unlawful Organizations Act was repealed by section 73 of the Internal Security Act, 1982. However, the Internal Security Act contained similar provisions allowing the government to ban organizations. The bans on the ANC, the PAC and other anti-apartheid groups were lifted in 1990 at the start of the negotiations to end apartheid. The Internal Security Act's provisions for banning organizations were finally repealed by the Security Matters Rationalisation Act in 1996.
