= South African Class 31-000 =

SOuth African locomotive model

South African Classes 1-DE & 31-000
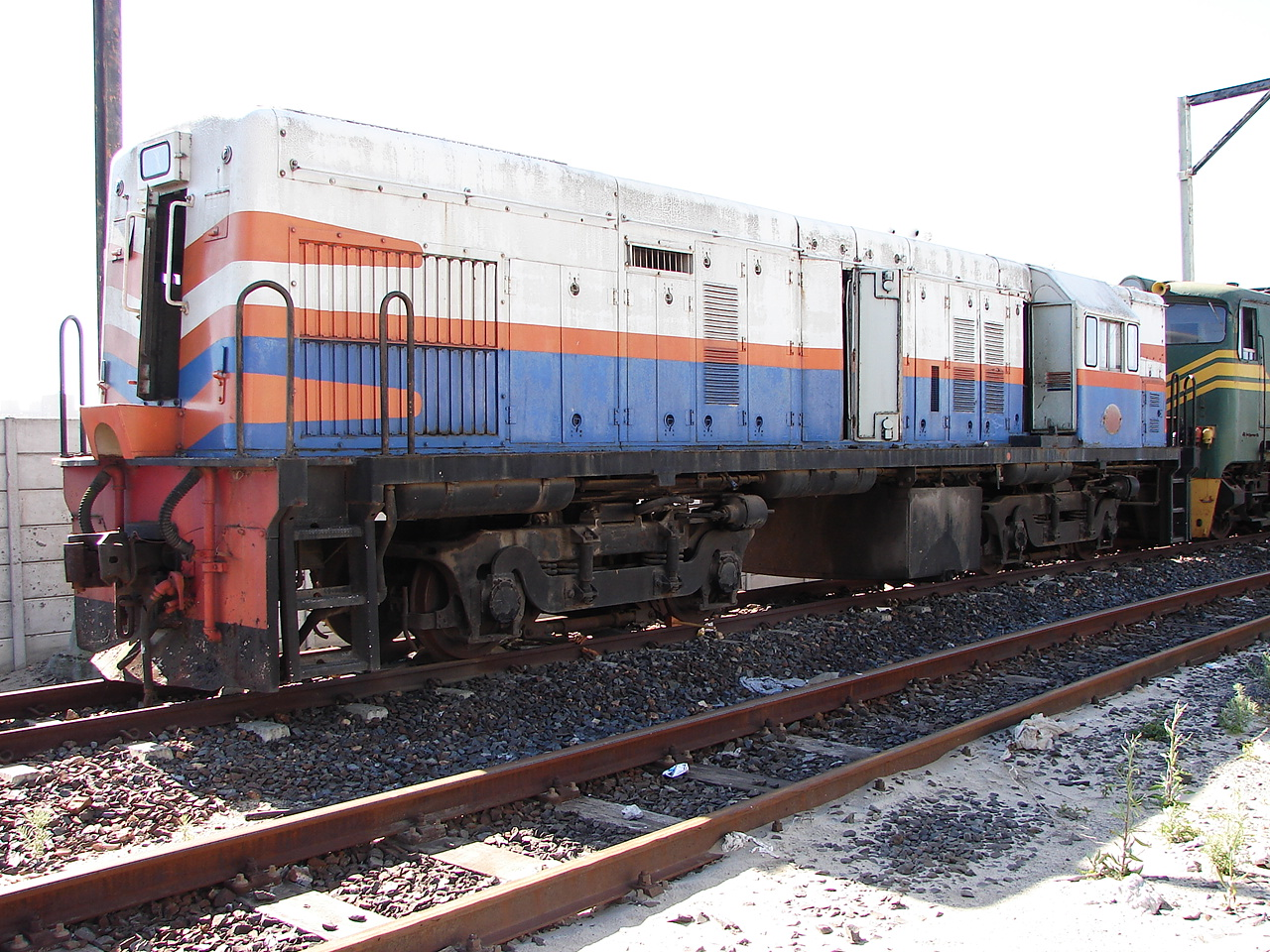
- No. 31-028 (D727) at Bellville Depot, 31 October 2010
Type and origin
- Power type: Diesel-electric
- Designer: General Electric
- Builder: General Electric
- Serial number: 33507-33551
- Model: GE U12B
- Build date: 1958
- Total produced: 45
Specifications
- Configuration
  - AAR: B-B
  - UIC: Bo'Bo'
  - Commonwealth: Bo-Bo
- Gauge: 3 ft 6 in (1,067 mm) Cape gauge
- Wheel diameter: 915 mm (36.0 in)
- Wheelbase: 10,118 mm (33 ft 2.3 in)
  - Bogie: 2,438 mm (8 ft 0 in)
- Pivot centres: 7,680 mm (25 ft 2.4 in)
- Length
  - Over couplers: 15,150 mm (49 ft 8.5 in)
- Width: 2,780 mm (9 ft 1.4 in)
- Height: 3,916 mm (12 ft 10.2 in)
- Axle load: 18,900 kg (41,700 lb)
- Adhesive weight: 75,600 kg (166,700 lb)
- Loco weight: 75,600 kg (166,700 lb) max
- Fuel type: Diesel
- Fuel capacity: 3,000 litres (660 imp gal)
- Prime mover: Cooper-Bessemer FVBL-8
- RPM range: 400-1,000
  - RPM low idle: 400
  - RPM idle: 535
  - Maximum RPM: 1,000
- Engine type: 4 stroke V8 diesel
- Aspiration: C-B ET13 turbocharger
- Generator: DC 10 pole GE 5GT-581C3
- Traction motors: Four GE 5GE-761A4 DC 4 pole
  - Rating 1 hour: 600A
  - Continuous: 590A @ 16 km/h (9.9 mph)
- Cylinders: V8
- Gear ratio: 94:17
- MU working: 3 maximum
- Loco brake: 6-SLAV-1 with vigilance control
- Train brakes: Westinghouse 6CDX4UC compressor/exhauster
- Air tank cap.: 700 litres (150 imp gal)
- Compressor: 0.039 m^{3}/s (1.4 cu ft/s)
- Exhauster: 0.155 m^{3}/s (5.5 cu ft/s)
- Couplers: AAR knuckle (SASKOP SS)
Performance figures
- Maximum speed: 90 km/h (56 mph)
- Power output
  - Starting: 985 kW (1,321 hp)
  - Continuous: 895 kW (1,200 hp)
- Tractive effort
  - Starting: 181 kN (41,000 lbf) @ 25% adhesion
  - Continuous: 145 kN (33,000 lbf) @ 18 km/h (11 mph)
- Factor of adh.
  - Starting: 25%
  - Continuous: 20% @ 18 km/h (11 mph)
- Brakeforce: 65% ratio @ 345 kPa (50.0 psi)
Career
- Operators: South African Railways; Spoornet; Sheltam
- Class: Class 31-000
- Number in class: 45
- Numbers: 31-001 to 31-045 (D700-D744)
- Delivered: June to July 1958
- First run: 1958

The South African Railways Class 31-000 of 1958 is a diesel-electric locomotive series.

In June and July 1958, the South African Railways placed forty-five Class 1-DE General Electric type U12B diesel-electric locomotives in service. They were later reclassified to Class 31-000 and renumbered.

== Manufacturer ==
The South African Class 31-000 type GE U12B diesel-electric locomotive was designed for the South African Railways (SAR) and built by General Electric in 1958. They were the first diesel-electric road locomotives to enter SAR service in quantity.

== Reclassification and renumbering ==
Upon delivery, they were designated Class 1-DE and numbered in the range from D700 to D744 in the non-steam locomotive number range which had hitherto been used almost exclusively for electric locomotives, the exceptions being the pre-war experimental Class DS and Class DS1 diesel-electric locomotives. After the SAR adopted a new classification and numbering system for diesel-powered locomotives upon the arrival of the Class 32-000 in 1959, they were reclassified to Class 31-000 and renumbered in the range from 31-001 to 31-045.

== Orientation ==
The Class 31-000 was a high short hood locomotive. While the short hood end was usually considered as the front end, the cab was equipped with dual station controls to make it fully bidirectional.

== Service ==
They were placed in service at Germiston. One of their first duties was to take over the shunt duties at Milner Park from where complaints had been received from the tennis players at the club about the cinders being deposited on the all-weather courts. When originally ordered, it had been the intention to use them on shunting and block-load transfers on the Reef and as part of the program to eliminate steam traction from the new Johannesburg station, but their success in this service prompted a change in utilisation policy. In 1959 they were placed in mainline service working out of Johannesburg to Kroonstad and Bloemfontein in the Free State and to Volksrust on the mainline to Natal. They were very successful on mainline work and showed their ability to handle anything from goods workings to fast passenger trains like the Trans-Natal. They usually worked in pairs and longer lash-ups of up to four units were rarely seen.

The Class 31-000 had a huge impact on SAR motive power. In terms of speed and acceleration, they were superb and it didn't take long for the diesels to become a common sight on mainline working. Their unqualified success played a large part in the eventual demise of SAR steam traction.

By 1969 they were also used in goods working on the line from Krugersdorp via Magaliesburg and Swartruggens to Zeerust. By the 1980s they were finally relegated to the shunting and pickup service that they were originally intended for when new, working on the Reef and at some other major centres.

== Withdrawal ==
Of the original forty-five locomotives, forty survived into the Spoornet era in the 1990s. Now retired from Spoornet service, some still see service in private hands. Three of them, numbers 31-001 (D700), 31-005 (D704) and 31-038 (D737), were acquired by Sheltam for use at Rand Uranium near Randfontein and at Welkom. The first two were converted to low short hood locomotives and were still in service in 2014, while the third was used for spare parts.

Another private rail operator, RRL Grindrod, owns no. 31-009 (D708) as its no. RB-201, which was still employed at Welkom in 2014.

== Preservation ==
As of 2015, no. D706 (31-007) has been staged at Bloemfontein Locomotive Depot where a Locomotive Museum is being created to restore it and some other historically significant units, while no. D727 (31-028) is preserved at Bellville Loco Depot.

== Liveries ==
The locomotives were delivered in a livery that displayed the colours of the South African flag, white on the upper half and blue on the lower half, separated by an orange stripe on the sides and orange whiskers on the ends. They had black running boards, red buffer beams and black cowcatchers. From 1960 this livery gradually began to be replaced by Gulf Red with yellow stripes.

== Works numbers ==
The Class 31-000 builder's works numbers, renumbering and known disposition are listed in the table.

Class 31-000, GE type U12B
Image	1-DE no.	GE works no.	31-000 no.	Post-SAR owner	Post-SAR no.	Sheltam new no.
	D700	33507	31-001	Sheltam	22	1202
	D701	33508	31-002			
	D702	33509	31-003			
	D703	33510	31-004			
	D704	33511	31-005	Sheltam	21	1201
	D705	33512	31-006			
	D706	33513	31-007	Staged		
	D707	33514	31-008			
	D708	33515	31-009	RRL	RB-201	
	D709	33516	31-010			
	D710	33517	31-011			
	D711	33518	31-012			
	D712	33519	31-013			
	D713	33520	31-014			
	D714	33521	31-015			
	D715	33522	31-016			
	D716	33523	31-017			
	D717	33524	31-018			
	D718	33525	31-019			
	D719	33526	31-020			
	D720	33527	31-021			
	D721	33528	31-022			
	D722	33529	31-023			
	D723	33530	31-024			
	D724	33531	31-025			
	D725	33532	31-026			
	D726	33533	31-027			
	D727	33534	31-028	Staged		
	D728	33535	31-029			
	D729	33536	31-030			
	D730	33537	31-031			
	D731	33538	31-032			
	D732	33539	31-033			
	D733	33540	31-034			
	D734	33541	31-035			
	D735	33542	31-036			
	D736	33543	31-037			
	D737	33544	31-038	Sheltam	23	2103
	D738	33545	31-039			
	D739	33546	31-040			
	D740	33547	31-041			
	D741	33548	31-042			
	D742	33549	31-043			
	D743	33550	31-044			
	D744	33551	31-045			

== Illustration ==
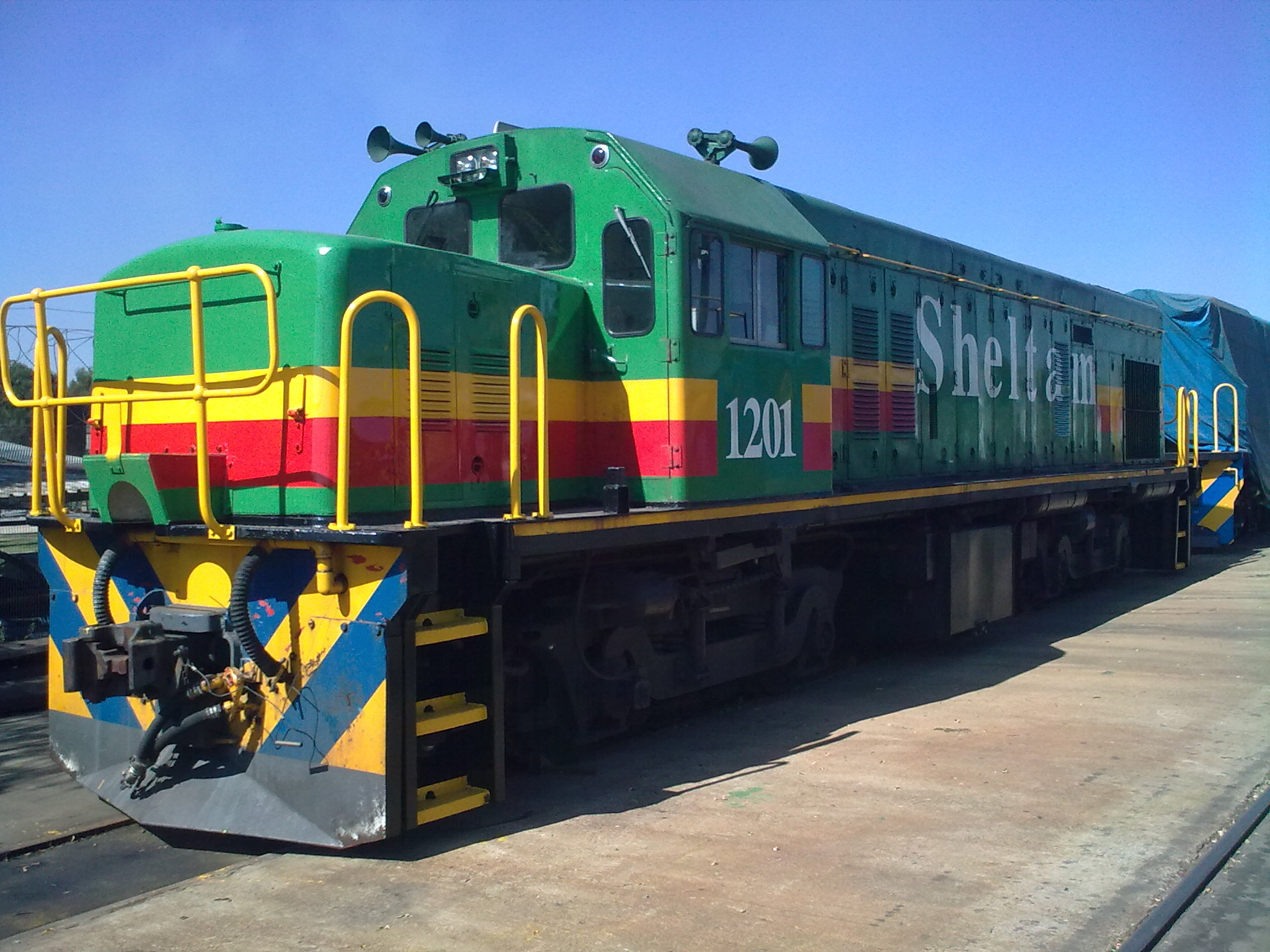
Sheltam no. 1201, ex SAR no. 31-005 (D704), 19 May 2010

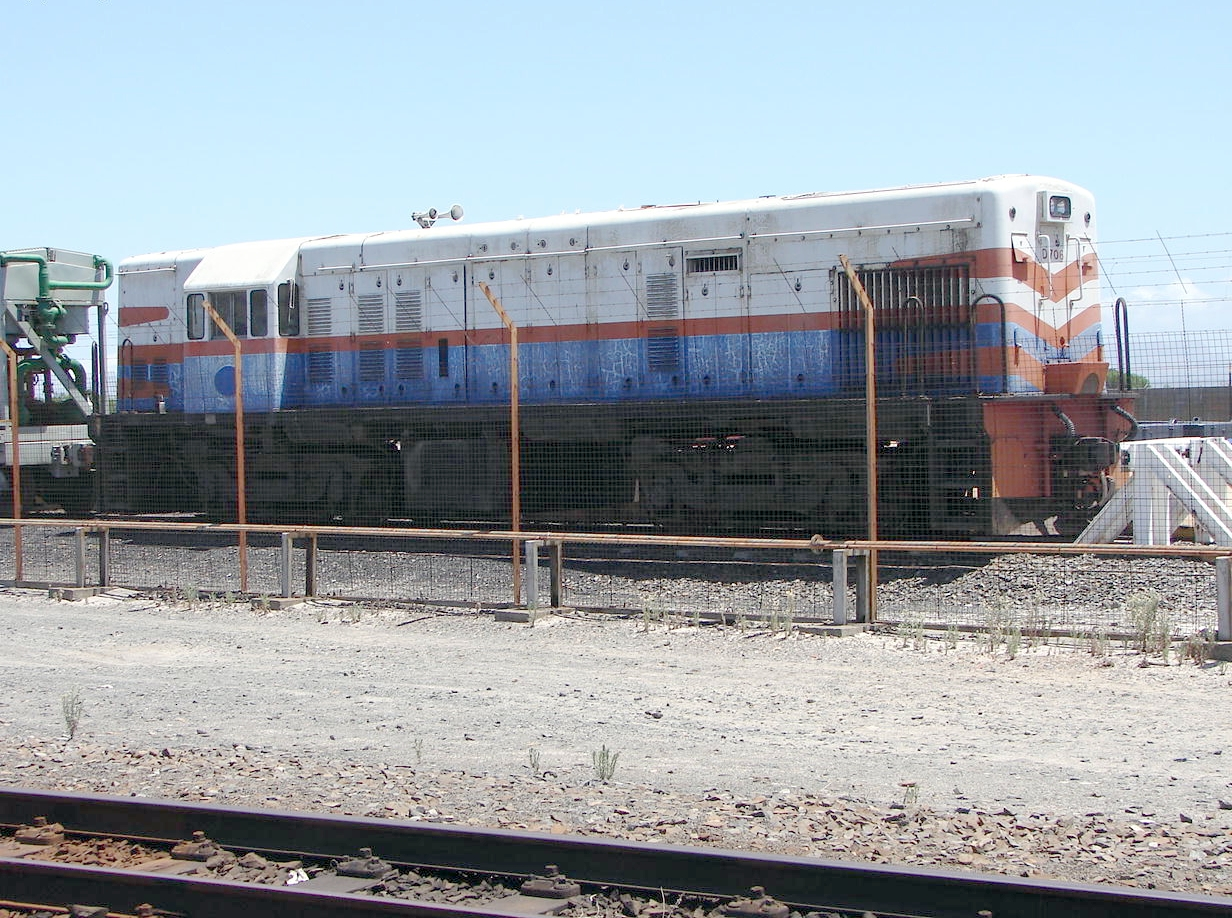
No. 31-007 (D706) at Bellville Loco Depot, 10 January 2009
