= South African Class 5E, Series 2 =

Class of 45 South African Bo′Bo′ electric locomotives

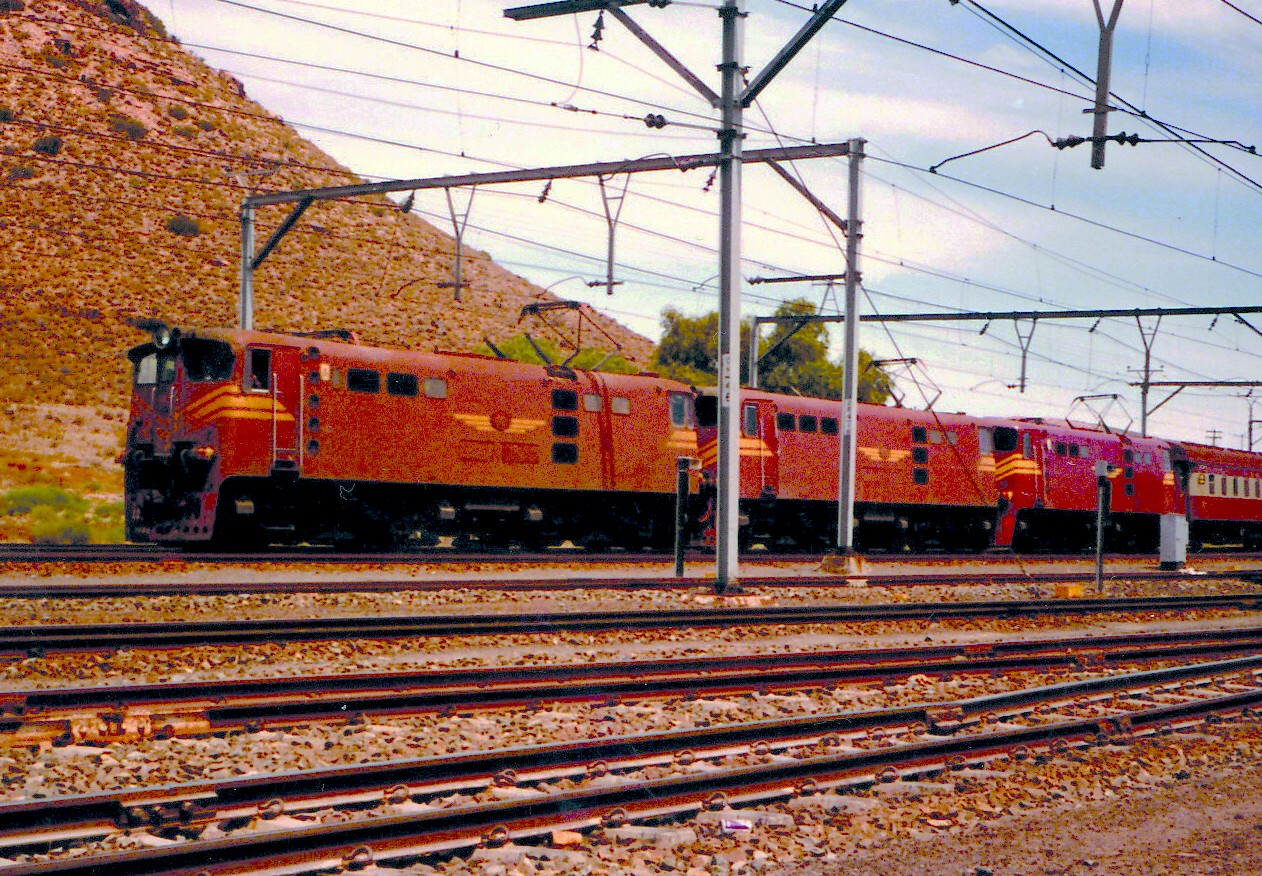
- No. E326 leading at Touws River, September 1984
Type and origin
- Power type: Electric
- Designer: English Electric
- Builder: Vulcan Foundry
- Serial number: EE 2421-2465, VF E149-E193
- Model: EE 5E
- Build date: 1956–1957
- Total produced: 45
Specifications
- Configuration
  - AAR: B-B
  - UIC: Bo'Bo'
  - Commonwealth: Bo-Bo
- Gauge: 3 ft 6 in (1,067 mm) Cape gauge
- Wheel diameter: 1,219 mm (48.0 in)
- Wheelbase: 11,279 mm (37 ft 1/16 in)
  - Bogie: 3,430 mm (11 ft 3 1/16 in)
- Pivot centres: 7,849 mm (25 ft 9 in)
- Panto shoes: 6,972 mm (22 ft 10 1/2 in)
- Length
  - Over couplers: 15,494 mm (50 ft 10 in)
  - Over body: 14,631 mm (48 ft 0 in)
- Width: 2,896 mm (9 ft 6 in)
- Height
  - Pantograph: 4,089 mm (13 ft 5 in)
  - Body height: 3,937 mm (12 ft 11 in)
- Axle load: 21,591 kg (47,600 lb)
- Adhesive weight: 86,364 kg (190,400 lb)
- Loco weight: 86,364 kg (190,400 lb)
- Electric system/s: 3 kV DC catenary
- Current pickup(s): Pantographs
- Traction motors: Four EE 529
  - Rating 1 hour: 377 kW (506 hp)
  - Continuous: 325 kW (436 hp)
- Gear ratio: 18:67
- Loco brake: Air & Regenerative
- Train brakes: Vacuum
- Couplers: AAR knuckle
Performance figures
- Maximum speed: 97 km/h (60 mph)
- Power output
  - 1 hour: 1,508 kW (2,022 hp)
  - Continuous: 1,300 kW (1,700 hp)
- Tractive effort
  - Starting: 200 kN (45,000 lbf)
  - 1 hour: 128 kN (29,000 lbf)
  - Continuous: 104 kN (23,000 lbf)
Career
- Operators: South African Railways; Spoornet; Impala Platinum; Driefontein
- Class: Class 5E
- Number in class: 45
- Numbers: E319-E363
- Nicknames: Balstamper
- Delivered: 1957–1958
- First run: 1957

The South African Railways Class 5E, Series 2 of 1957 was an electric locomotive.

In 1957 and 1958, the South African Railways placed forty-five Class 5E, Series 2 electric locomotives with a Bo-Bo wheel arrangement in mainline service.

== Manufacturer ==
The 3 kV DC Class 5E, Series 2 electric locomotive was built for the South African Railways (SAR) by Vulcan Foundry (VF) on a sub-contract from English Electric (EE), who had designed the locomotive and supplied the electrical equipment. Forty-five series 2 locomotives were delivered and placed in service in 1957 and 1958, numbered in the range from E319 to E363.

They were delivered in a bottle green livery with red cowcatchers. Yellow lines and whiskers were added later to improve their visibility. Beginning in 1960, a Gulf Red and yellow whiskers livery replaced the green and yellow. Since repainting was only done during major overhauls, some of these units were still working in their original as-delivered plain green livery without yellow whiskers as late as 1963.

== Orientation ==
These dual cab locomotives had a roof access ladder on one side only, just to the right of the cab access door. The roof access ladder end was marked as the no. 2 end. A corridor along the centre of the locomotive connected the cabs, which were identical except that Cab 2 was where the handbrake was located.

== Service ==
According to crews, the Class 5E gave a rough ride, which soon earned it the nickname balstamper. The successor Class 5E1 with its new design bogies gave a smoother ride.

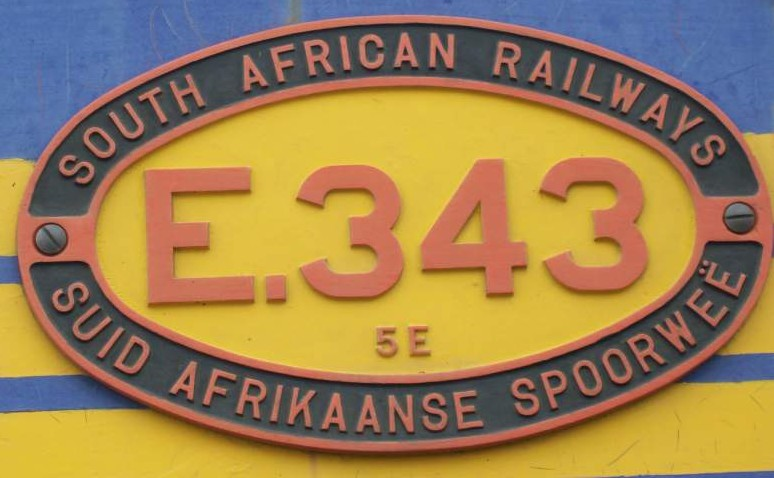
Builder's plate

The Class 5E entered service on the Natal mainline between Durban and Johannesburg and eventually served almost country-wide as electrification was completed on more mainlines. In 1960, sixty units of the Class 5E family were allocated to the Witbank section upon completion of its electrification. In December 1961 twelve of them were replaced by Class 32-000 diesel-electric locomotives and transferred to the newly electrified Touws River-Beaufort West section. More followed to replace the Class 25 condensers that were being transferred from that section to Beaconsfield in Kimberley at the time.

After withdrawal from service, three Class 5E, Series 2 locomotives were sold into industrial service.

- No. E320 was sold to the Impala platinum mine in Rustenburg.
- No. E343 and E356 were sold to the Driefontein gold mine near Carletonville.

== Works numbers ==
The EE and VF works numbers of the Class 5E, Series 2 and their known disposal are listed in the table.

Class 5E, Series 2
Loco no.	EE works no.	VF works no.	Sold to
E319	2421	E149	
E320	2422	E150	Impala
E321	2423	E151	
E322	2424	E152	
E323	2425	E153	
E324	2426	E154	
E325	2427	E155	
E326	2428	E156	
E327	2429	E157	
E328	2430	E158	
E329	2431	E159	
E330	2432	E160	
E331	2433	E161	
E332	2434	E162	
E333	2435	E163	
E334	2436	E164	
E335	2437	E165	
E336	2438	E166	
E337	2439	E167	
E338	2440	E168	
E339	2441	E169	
E340	2442	E170	
E341	2443	E171	
E342	2444	E172	
E343	2445	E173	Dries
E344	2446	E174	
E345	2447	E175	
E346	2448	E176	
E347	2449	E177	
E348	2450	E178	
E349	2451	E179	
E350	2452	E180	
E351	2453	E181	
E352	2454	E182	
E353	2455	E183	
E354	2456	E184	
E355	2457	E185	
E356	2458	E186	Dries
E357	2459	E187	
E358	2460	E188	
E359	2461	E189	
E360	2462	E190	
E361	2463	E191	
E362	2464	E192	
E363	2465	E193	

== Illustration ==
The main picture shows Series 2 no. E326 and E319 and Series 1 no. E297, departing Touws River heading northeast towards Beaufort West in September 1984. The following pictures show the SAR Gulf Red and the Driefontein gold mine liveries. An overhead view of the locomotive is shown in a picture taken at an accident scene near Olifantsfontein in 1975.

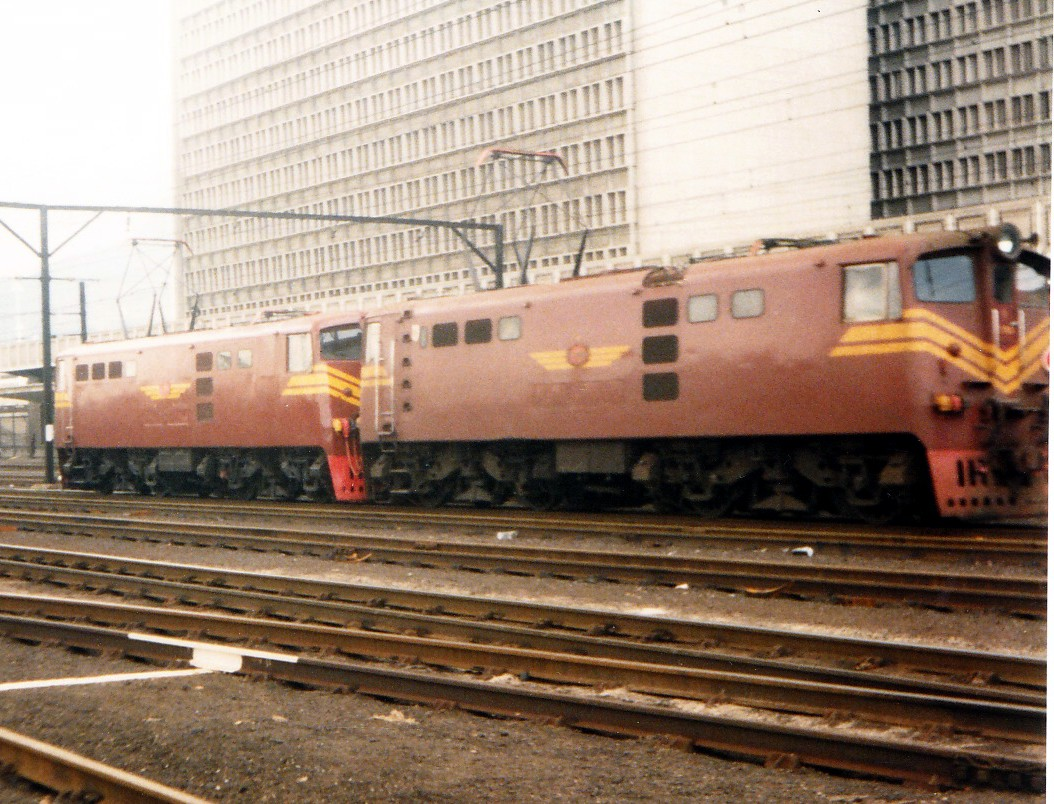
No. E345 with Series 1 no. E295 in the Table Bay Docks, c. 1984

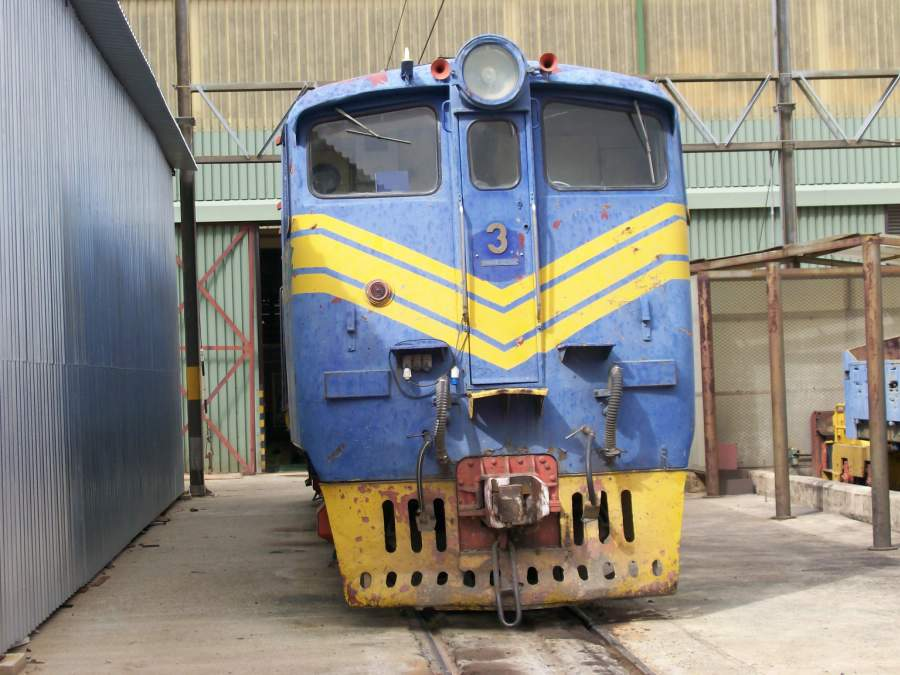
Driefontein Gold Mine no. 3, ex SAR no. E356, Carletonville, 21 January 2009

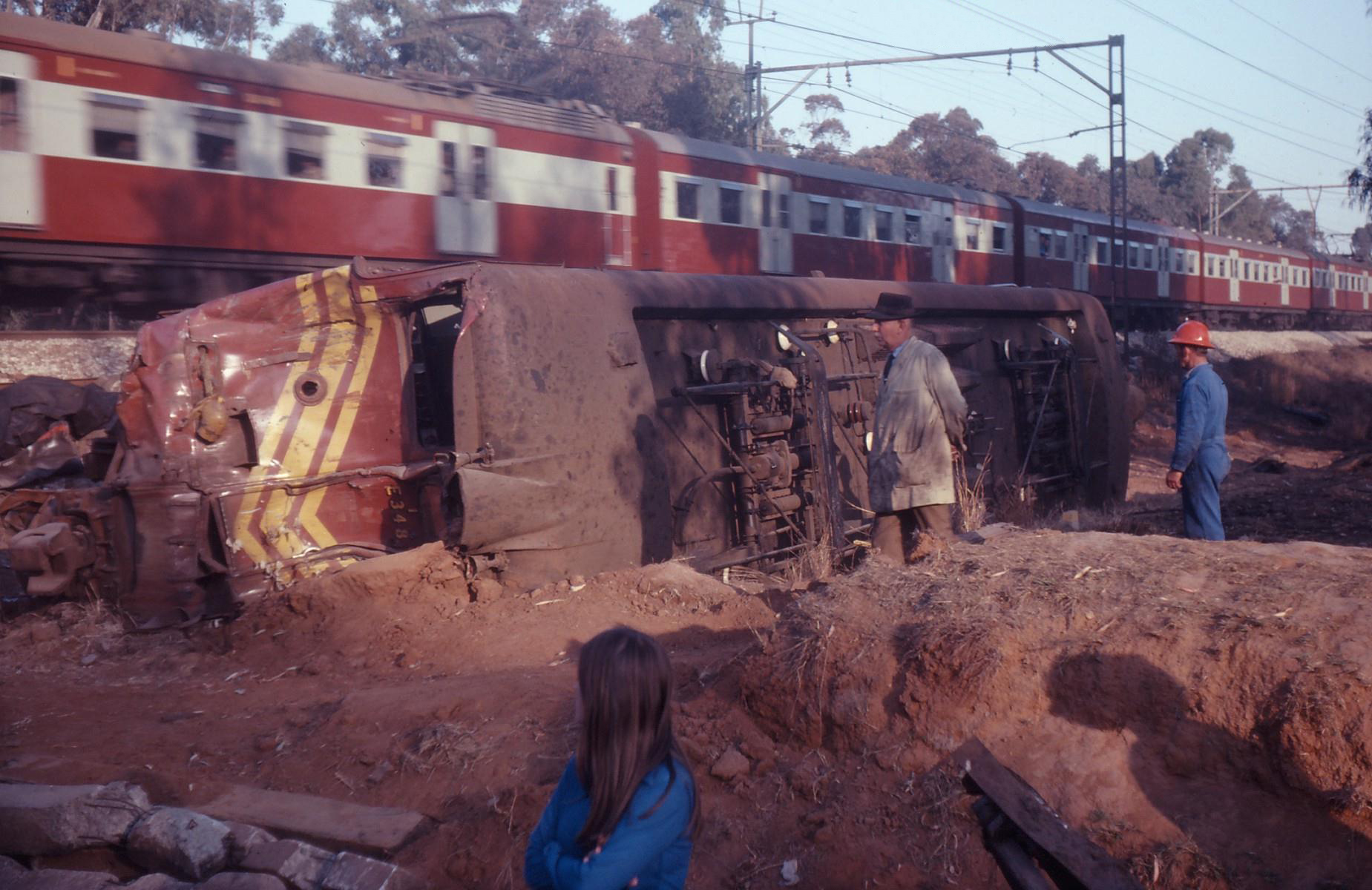
No. E348 wrecked near Olifantsfontein, Transvaal, c. July 1975
