= General Law Amendment Act, 1962 =

Act of South African parliament

Parliament of South Africa
- Long title: To amend the Suppression of Communism Act, 1950, the Public Safety Act, 1953, the Criminal Procedure Act, 1955, the Riotous Assemblies Act, 1956, and the Unlawful Organizations Act, 1960, to define and prohibit sabotage and to provide for other incidental matters.
- Citation: Act No. 76 of 1962
- Enacted by: Parliament of South Africa
- Assented to: 22 June 1962
- Commenced: 27 June 1962
- Administered by: Minister of Justice

Amended by
- Lower Courts Amendment Act 91 of 1977; Criminal Procedure Act 51 of 1977; Abolition of Juries Act 34 of 1969; General Law Amendment Act 62 of 1966

The General Law Amendment Act No. 76 of 1962, also known as the Sabotage Act, was an Act of the South African Parliament passed by the apartheid government.

It widened the definition of sabotage to include strikes, trade union activity, and writing slogans on walls. The maximum penalty for sabotage was hanging and the minimum five years' imprisonment. It reversed the normal burden of proof so that the accused were assumed to be guilty and had to prove their innocence. Publications opposing the government were liable to a fine of R20,000.

The Act extended the powers of the Minister of Justice, a post held in 1962 by B. J. Vorster, to ban people and organisations. Anyone who had been charged under the Suppression of Communism Act, 1950 could be banned from holding office in named institutions. Such people became known as "statutory Communists" - even if they had never actually been members of the South African Communist Party. They could be put under house arrest without trial, made to report daily to the police and be prohibited from attending social gatherings.
