= 1942 in South Africa =

- Decades: 1920s; 1930s; 1940s; 1950s; 1960s
- See also: List of years in South Africa

The following lists events that happened during 1942 in South Africa.

== Incumbents ==
- Monarch: King George VI.
- Governor-General and High Commissioner for Southern Africa: Sir Patrick Duncan
- Prime Minister: Jan Christiaan Smuts.
- Chief Justice: Nicolaas Jacobus de Wet.

== Events ==
- January – War Measure No. 9 was issued.
- 5 May – 6 November – South African 7th Motorised Brigade and South African Air Force join the allied forces in Operation Ironclad to capture Madagascar.
- 29 November – Blue Star Line cargo liner MV Dunedin Star runs aground on the Skeleton Coast of South West Africa.

== Births ==
- 12 April – Jacob Zuma, African National Congress president and 3rd President of South Africa.
- 22 May – Pallo Jordan, African National Congress politician and fake PhD.
- 24 May – Ali Bacher, cricketer and cricket administrator.
- 18 June – Thabo Mbeki, 2nd President of South Africa.
- 25 June – Joe Mafela, actor (d. 2017).
- 28 June – Chris Hani, leader of the South African Communist Party and chief of staff of Umkhonto we Sizwe. (d. 1993).
- 8 August – Douglas Gibson, politician and diplomat (d. 2025).
- 30 August – John Kani, actor and playwright.

== Deaths ==
- 25 April – John Royston, soldier and farmer. (b. 1860)
- 16 June – Jack Frost, Second World War fighter pilot, is reported missing in action. (b. 1918)
