= 1950 in South Africa =

- Decades: 1930s; 1940s; 1950s; 1960s; 1970s
- See also: List of years in South Africa

This is a list of events that occurred in 1950 in South Africa.

== Incumbents ==
- Monarch: King George VI.
- Governor-General and High Commissioner for Southern Africa: Gideon Brand van Zyl.
- Prime Minister: Daniel François Malan.
- Chief Justice: Ernest Frederick Watermeyer then Albert van der Sandt Centlivres.

== Events ==
March

- 18 – The University of the Free State is established.

April

- 27 – The Group Areas Act is passed, formally segregating the races.

May

- 1 – 18 blacks are killed by police and more than 30 are injured on the Witwatersrand in a massive stay-away from work, called for by the African National Congress.
- 1 – Springbok Radio, the SABC's first commercial service, is launched.

June

- 26 – The Suppression of Communism Act is passed.

August

- 5 – 2 Squadron SAAF departs for the Korean War.
- 6 – The municipality of East London decides not to approve prospecting for oil off the city's seafront.

September

- 26 – Sasol (Suid-Afrikaanse Steenkool, Olie en Gaskorporasie Bpk.) is registered as a company.

October

- 23 – Ernest George Jansen is appointed the 9th Governor-General of the Union of South Africa.

November

- 2 – South African Airways inaugurates daily services between Johannesburg and Bulawayo and between Johannesburg and Cape Town.

December

- 13 – South Africa refuses to place South-West Africa under UN trusteeship.
- 21 – The gold town of Allanridge in the Free State Province is established.

Unknown date

- Oribi Gorge Nature Reserve is proclaimed a protected state forest.
- Hendrik Verwoerd becomes Minister of Native Affairs.
- The government passes the Immorality Amendment Act, the Group Areas Act, the Suppression of Communism Act, and the Population Registration Act which officially divides South Africans into 'White', 'Coloured', 'Asian' or 'Native' population groups.
- The United States and United Kingdom sign a purchasing agreement with South Africa to supply uranium for their nuclear weapons programmes.
- The Parliament of South Africa passes the Privy Council Appeals Act, 1950 (Act No. 16) to terminate appeals from the Appellate Division of the Supreme Court of South Africa to the Judicial Committee of the Privy Council in London.

== Births ==
- 29 January – Jody Scheckter, 1979 Formula One World Drivers' Champion.
- 1 June – Johann Rupert, billionaire businessman, son of billionaire Rembrandt Group founder Anton Rupert.
- 18 August – Nandi Nyembe, actress.
- 19 October – Yvonne Mokgoro, jurist (d. 2024).

== Deaths ==
- 25 April – John Ernest Adamson, English educationalist and Director of Education of the Colony of Transvaal (b. 1867 in the United Kingdom)
- 11 September – Jan Smuts, soldier and international statesman. (b. 1870)

== Railways ==
=== Railway lines opened ===
- 2 October – Transvaal: Vandyksdrif to Broodsnyersplaas, 11 miles 73 chains (19.2 kilometres).

== Sports ==
=== Boxing ===
- 31 May – Vic Toweel defeats World Bantamweight Champion Manuel Ortiz on points over 15 rounds at Wembley Stadium and becomes the first South African world boxing champion.

=== British Empire Games ===
The British Empire Games (now the Commonwealth Games), after a 12-year gap, takes place in Auckland, New Zealand from 4 to 11 February. Of the 12 participating countries which include Southern Rhodesia, South Africa finishes 5th on the medals list, winning 20 medals, 8 Gold, 4 Silver and 8 Bronze. The medal winners are:

Athletics

- Neville Price – Gold, long jump, distance 7.31 m
- Syd Luyt – Silver, marathon, time 2.37.03
- Tom Lavery – Bronze, 120 yards hurdles, time 14.6 s
- Daphne Robb; Bronze, 220 yards, time 24.7 s

Boxing

- Johnny van Rensburg – Gold, bantamweight
- Theunis van Schalkwyk – Gold, middleweight
- Marcus Temple – Bronze, flyweight

Lawn bowls

- Alfred Blumberg, H.Currer, Harry Atkinson and Norman Walker – Gold, fours
- W. Gibb and H.J. van Zyl – Silver, pairs

Rowing

- Ian Stephen – Bronze, single sculls

Swimming

- Graham Johnston – Silver, 440 yards freestyle
- Graham Johnston – Gold, 1650 yards freestyle
- Jackie Wild – Gold, 110 yards backstroke
- Joan Harrison – Bronze, 110 yards freestyle
- Joan Harrison – Gold, 440 yards freestyle

Weightlifting

- Barrie Engelbrecht – Bronze, featherweight
- Issy Bloomberg – Silver, light-heavyweight

Wrestling

- Patrick Morton – Gold, light-heavyweight
- Martin Jooste – Bronze, welterweight
- Carel Reitz – Bronze, middleweight

=== Comrades Marathon ===
- Wally Hayward, at age 42 and after a twenty-year gap, wins the Comrades Marathon from Durban to Pietermaritzburg in a time of 6h 46m 25s. Twenty runners of the 29 who start finish in the allotted time.

=== Football ===
June–July

The Australia national association football team tours South Africa and plays four games against the South Africa national football team.

- 24 June – South Africa wins 3–2 at Kingsmead, Durban.
- 1 July – South Africa wins 2–1 at Ellis Park, Johannesburg.
- 8 July – Australia wins 2–1 at St George's Park, Port Elizabeth.
- 23 July – Australia wins 2–0 at Hartley Vale, Cape Town.
