= 1945 in South Africa =

- Decades: 1920s; 1930s; 1940s; 1950s; 1960s
- See also: List of years in South Africa

The following lists events that happened during 1945 in South Africa.

== Incumbents ==
- Monarch: King George VI.
- Governor-General and High Commissioner for Southern Africa: Nicolaas Jacobus de Wet.
- Prime Minister: Jan Christiaan Smuts.
- Chief Justice: Ernest Frederick Watermeyer.

== Events ==
- 22 May – The South African Bureau of Standards (SABS) is established.
- 26 June – Prime Minister Jan Smuts represents South Africa in San Francisco at the drafting of the United Nations Charter.

== Births ==
- 3 February – Marius Weyers, actor
- 8 June – Nicky Oppenheimer, mining magnate
- 27 June – Omar Badsha, photographer, trade unionist and political activist.
- 21 July – Barry Richards, cricketer
- 28 September – Pieter-Dirk Uys, performer, author, satirist, and social activist.
- 5 October – Riaan Cruywagen, news reader and voice artist
- 16 October – Kaizer Motaung, footballer, founder & chairman of Kaizer Chiefs F.C.
- 22 October – Lillian Dube, actress & TV host
- 17 December – Belinda Bozzoli, academic and politician (d.2020)

== Railways ==
=== Railway lines opened ===
- 4 June – Transvaal: Village Main (Booysens) to Faraday, 1 mile 11 chains (1.8 kilometres).
