= 1943 in South Africa =

- Decades: 1920s; 1930s; 1940s; 1950s; 1960s
- See also: List of years in South Africa

The following lists events that happened during 1943 in South Africa.

== Incumbents ==
- Monarch: King George VI.
- Governor-General: Sir Patrick Duncan (until 17 July), Nicolaas Jacobus de Wet (acting starting 17 July).
- Prime Minister: Jan Christiaan Smuts.
- Chief Justice: Nicolaas Jacobus de Wet then Ernest Frederick Watermeyer.

== Events ==
- 27 January – Prime Minister of South Africa Jan Smuts asks parliament for approval to send troops into Europe.
- 13 May – German Afrika Korps and Italian troops in North Africa surrender to Allied forces.
- 18 July – Nicolaas Jacobus de Wet is appointed Officer Administering the Government, i.e. acting Governor-General of the Union of South Africa.

Unknown date

- Reclamation work begins on the Foreshore in Cape Town.
- 500 Polish orphans arrive in Oudtshoorn from the Soviet Union.

== Births ==
- 5 March – Mmakgabo Helen Sebidi, artist
- 30 May – Ken Andrew, politician
- 1 June – Lorrie Wilmot, cricketer (d. 2004)
- 29 October – Ina Cronjé, politician (d. 2023)

== Deaths ==
- 6 July – Alexander Coultate Rabagliati, fighter pilot, is reported missing in action.
- 17 July – Sir Patrick Duncan, 6th Governor-General of the Union of South Africa. (b. 1870)

== Railways ==
=== Railway lines opened ===
- 29 January – Transvaal: New Canada to Phomolong, 2 miles 75 chains (4.7 kilometres).
- 7 June – Transvaal: Hercules to Koedoespoort, 7 miles 17 chains (11.6 kilometres).

== Sports ==
- 1942–43 South African cricket season
