= 1949 in South Africa =

- Decades: 1920s; 1930s; 1940s; 1950s; 1960s
- See also: List of years in South Africa

The following lists events that happened during 1949 in South Africa.

== Incumbents ==
- Monarch: King George VI.
- Governor-General and High Commissioner for Southern Africa: Gideon Brand van Zyl.
- Prime Minister: Daniel François Malan.
- Chief Justice: Ernest Frederick Watermeyer.

== Events ==
January

- 13,14 – Durban riots against Indians

June

- 29 – South Africa introduces its apartheid policy.

July

- 1 – The Prohibition of Mixed Marriages Act, 1949, Act No. 55 of 1949, is passed.

October

- 30 – Ben Schoeman announces in Johannesburg that the NP would carry the apartheid policy through "notwithstanding what serious economic problems it might cause".

November

- 1 – Seretse Khama and his British wife Ruth Williams Khama are declared forbidden in South Africa.

December

- 16 – The Voortrekker Monument is officially inaugurated in Pretoria.

Unknown date

- The University of Pretoria establishes the Graduate School of Management (GSM), the first MBA programme to be launched outside of North America.
- The South African Post Office begins to force Europeans and non-Europeans to stand in separate queues in post offices and serve them at different counters.

== Births ==
- 27 January – Nkosazana Dlamini-Zuma, politician.
- 29 January – Eugene de Kock, South African Police colonel and assassin.
- 26 March – Rudi Koertzen, cricket umpire (d. 2022)
- 8 April – Fanie de Jager, operatic tenor.
- 12 April – Pravin Gordhan, national minister (d. 2024)
- 23 May – Estian Calitz, academic.
- 2 June – Michael Lapsley, Anglican priest and activist.
- 14 June
  - Niel Barnard, intelligence chief (d. 2025)
  - Antony Sher, actor (d. 2021)
- 17 July – William C. Faure, film director. (d. 1994)
- 19 July – Kgalema Motlhanthe, politician, former President of South Africa.
- 23 July – Clive Rice, cricketer. (d. 2015)
- 21 October – Morne du Plessis, Springboks captain & rugby administrator.
- 24 November – Neall Ellis, helicopter pilot and mercenary.
- 28 November – Nosimo Balindlela, politician.

== Deaths ==
- 4 May – Hendrik Adolph Mulder, poet and Afrikaans literary critic.

== Railways ==
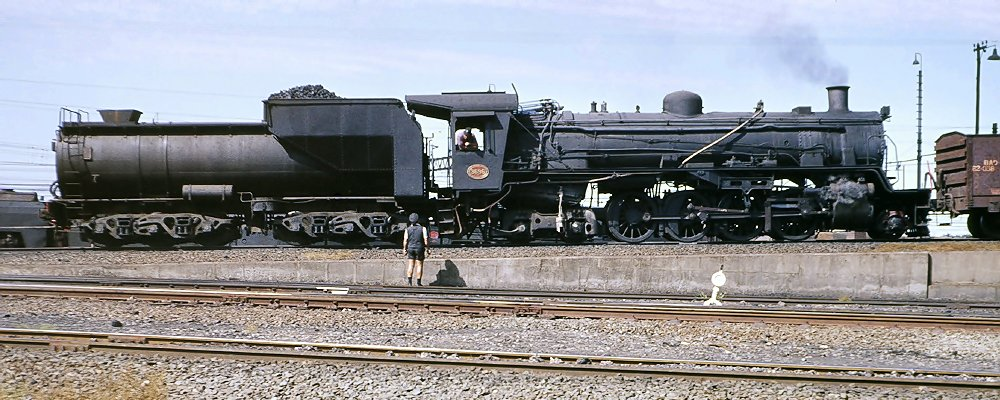
Class 24

=== Locomotives ===
- The South African Railways places the first of one hundred Class 24 2-8-4 Berkshire type branchline steam locomotives in service, most of them on the South West Africa System.

=== Sport ===
7.1 Golf

- Bobby Locke tied with Harry Bradshaw (Ireland) both scored 283 (−5).Bobby Locke then won the 36 holes play-off by 12 shots. British Open championship. Royal St. Georges Golf Club. Sandwich. 6–9 July 1949.

7.2 Tennis

- Eric Sturgess & Sheila Summers became the South Africa's first Wimbledon champions when they beat John Bromwich (Australia) & Louis Brough (USA), 8–7, 9–11, 7–5, to win the mixed doubles final.
- Eric Sturgess was awarded the Helms Trophy as the best athlete of the African continent.
