= 1947 in South Africa =

- Decades: 1920s; 1930s; 1940s; 1950s; 1960s
- See also: List of years in South Africa

The following lists events that happened during 1947 in South Africa.

== Incumbents ==
- Monarch: King George VI.
- Governor-General and High Commissioner for Southern Africa: Gideon Brand van Zyl.
- Prime Minister: Jan Christiaan Smuts.
- Chief Justice: Ernest Frederick Watermeyer.

== Events ==
February

- 17 – King George VI in his capacity as King-Emperor of South Africa within the British Commonwealth visits the country with his family, for a royal tour, the first British monarch to do so in South African history..

March

- 9 – The Three Doctors' Pact (also known as the Dadoo-Naicker-Xuma Pact) is signed by Dr A.B. Xuma (African National Congress), Dr Monty Naicker (Natal Indian Congress) and Dr Yusuf Dadoo (Transvaal Indian Congress).

April

- 18 – Mrs. Ples is discovered near Sterkfontein.

May

- 4 – The Natal Indian Organisation is formed.

December

- 29 – Marion Island is annexed by South Africa.

== Births ==
- 23 March – Ray Phiri, musician (d. 2017)
- 14 May – Hans Strydom, actor and writer
- 2 June – King Ingwenyama Mayitjha III of the Ndzundza-Mabhoko Southern Ndebele people. (d. 2005)
- 2 July – George Weideman, poet and writer. (d. 2008)
- 16 July – Roelf Meyer, politician.
- 5 August – Angus Buchan, televangelist, pastor & farmer.
- 30 August – Tshenuwani Farisani, politician and Lutheran minister (d. 2025)
- 15 September – Sandra Prinsloo, actress
- 28 October – Busi Mhlongo, musician. (d. 2010)

== Railways ==
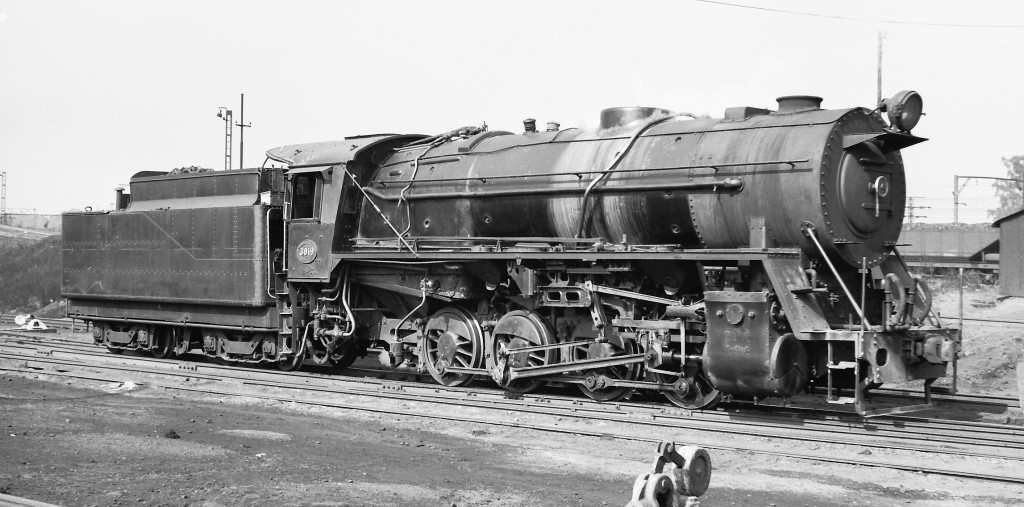
Class S1

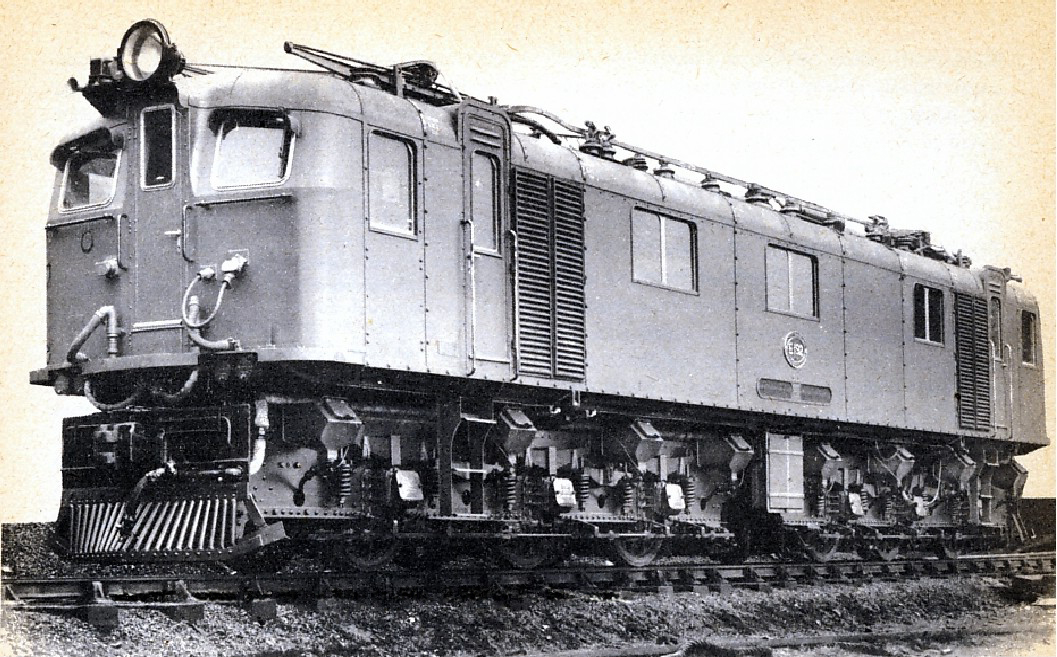
Class 3E

=== Locomotives ===
Two new Cape gauge locomotive types enter service on the South African Railways (SAR):

- Twelve Class S1 0-8-0 shunting steam locomotives, designed and built in the Salt River workshops in Cape Town.
- The first of twenty-eight Class 3E electric locomotives.

== Sports ==
=== Cricket ===
May–August

The South Africa national cricket team tours England and plays five Test matches against the England national cricket team.

Test matches

- 1st Test at Trent Bridge – match drawn
- 2nd Test at Lord's – England won by 10 wickets
- 3rd Test at Old Trafford – England won by 7 wickets
- 4th Test at Headingley – England won by 10 wickets
- 5th Test at The Oval – match drawn

=== Football ===
May–July

The South Africa national football team tours Australia and New Zealand and plays five games against the Australia national association football team and four against the New Zealand men's national football team.Team-H.Smethurst (capt.), L.G.Anley, A.G.Falconer, D.A.Wilson, H.D.McCreadie, R.H.F.Nicholson, D.D.Forbes, E.G.Dowell, S.van Rensburg, C.Kurland, R.Ferriman, H.E.Naish, J.H.Classens, H.J.Pretorius, J.H.M.Pickerill, C.L.Brink, B.Clack, S.O'Linn.J.H.Barbour (mgr).M.Taylor (ast.mgr).

- Australia
  - 10 May – South Africa wins 2–1 at the Sydney Cricket Grounds, Australia.
  - 24 May – South Africa wins 4–2 at the Brisbane Cricket Grounds, Australia.
  - 31 May – South Africa and Australia draw 3–3 at the Sydney Show Grounds, Australia.
  - 7 June – Australia wins 5–1 at the Newcastle Sports Grounds, Australia.
  - 14 June – South Africa wins 2–1 at the Sydney Cricket Grounds, Australia.
  New Zealand
  - 28 June – South Africa wins 6–5 at the Lancaster Park, Christchurch, New Zealand.
  - 5 July – South Africa wins 6–0 at the Carisbrook Stadium, Dunedin, New Zealand.
  - 12 July – South Africa wins 8–3 at the Athletic Park, Wellington, New Zealand.
  - 19 July – South Africa wins 4–1 at the Eden Park, Auckland, New Zealand.
