= 1948 in South Africa =

- Decades: 1920s; 1930s; 1940s; 1950s; 1960s
- See also: List of years in South Africa

The following lists events that happened during 1948 in South Africa.

== Incumbents ==
- Monarch: King George VI.
- Governor-General and High Commissioner for Southern Africa: Gideon Brand van Zyl.
- Prime Minister: Jan Christiaan Smuts (until 4 June), Daniel François Malan (starting 4 June).
- Chief Justice: Ernest Frederick Watermeyer.

== Events ==
January

- 4 – Prince Edward Island is annexed.

March

- 13 – Dr. K. Goonam leads a batch of twelve passive resisters across the Natal-Transvaal border.

May

- 26 – The National Party wins the General Elections in coalition with the Afrikaner Party (AP).
- 28 – The National Party forms a new South African government as incumbent prime minister Jan Smuts loses his seat.

June

- 4 – Daniel François Malan is elected the 4th Prime Minister of South Africa.
- 12 – The first Rembrandt cigarettes are manufactured.

September

- 8 – A group of 83 German children, orphaned by the war, arrives in Table Bay.
- 10 – The German orphans reach Pretoria to settle in South Africa.

October

- 15 – Foreign Minister Eric Louw informs Commonwealth leaders that South Africa is not prepared to allow interference in its domestic affairs.

== Births ==
- 27 January – Irvin Khoza, football administrator, chairman of Orlando Pirates F.C., president of the Premier Soccer League
- 2 February – Mluleki George, politician.
- 10 February – Paul Slabolepszy, actor and playwright.
- 24 June – Dave Orchard, cricketer.
- 9 July – Jeanne Zaidel-Rudolph, composer, pianist and teacher.
- 18 July – Graham Spanier, 16th President of Pennsylvania State University
- 27 July – Goodwill Zwelithini kaBhekuzulu, King of the Zulu.
- 27 July – Gavin Watson, businessman (d. 2019).
- 30 July – John Briscoe, South African-American epidemiologist, engineer, and academic (d. 2014)
- 5 September – Pumza Dyantyi, politician and anti-apartheid activist (d. 2020)
- 17 October – S'bu Ndebele, politician, government minister
- 25 October – Lauritz Dippenaar, self made millionaire businessman, investor and banker who was the Chairman of FirstRand financial Group.
- 10 December – Thamsanga Mnyele, artist and activist. (d. 1985)
- 13 December
  - Lillian Board, South African-born English Olympic athlete. (d. 1970)
  - William Flynn, actor and comedian, (d. 2007)

== Deaths ==
- 2 February – Bevil Rudd, athlete. (b. 1894)
- 25 February – Alexander du Toit, geologist. (b. 1878)
- 3 December – Jan Hofmeyr, Prime Minister of South Africa. (b. 1894)

== Railways ==
=== Railway lines opened ===
- 7 June – Free State: Whites to Odendaalsrus, 24 miles 27 chains (39.2 kilometres).

== Sports ==
- South Africa at the 1948 Summer Olympics
- English cricket team in South Africa in 1948–49
