= 1946 in South Africa =

- Decades: 1920s; 1930s; 1940s; 1950s; 1960s
- See also: List of years in South Africa

The following lists events that happened during 1946 in South Africa.

== Incumbents ==
- Monarch: King George VI.
- Governor-General: Gideon Brand van Zyl (starting 1 January).
- Prime Minister: Jan Christiaan Smuts.
- Chief Justice: Ernest Frederick Watermeyer.

== Events ==
January

- 1 – Gideon Brand van Zyl is appointed the 7th Governor-General of the Union of South Africa.

March

- 12 – The South African Indian Congress delegation is received by the Viceroy, Lord Wavell, in Delhi, India, and submits a petition drafted in consultation with Mohandas Gandhi.
- 12 – The Indian Representative Act is repealed.
- 12 – India terminates the trade agreement with South Africa.
- 15 – The Asiatic Land Tenure Act, the "Ghetto Act", is amended to state that Indians may only live where Indians had resided in non-proclaimed areas.
- 31 – 6,000 Indians march in Durban in protest to the Asiatic Land Tenure Act.

April

- 16 – The Eureka Diamond, the first diamond discovered in South Africa, is sold in London for £5,700.

June

- 11 – India recalls its High Commissioner from South Africa.
- 22 – During a prayer meeting in New Delhi, India, Mahatma Gandhi calls for South Africa to stop hooliganism by whites.
- 23 – A group of white men attack and assault a group of Indian Passive Resisters.

July

- 8 – Indian protests against government legislation lead to the arrest of hundreds of Indians.

== Births ==
- 8 January – Whitey Basson, businessman and billionaire, former CEO of Shoprite
- 18 January – Jakes Gerwel, academic and politician. (d. 2012)
- 19 July – Lucas Malan, Afrikaans poet, author and academic
- 15 September – Mike Procter, cricketer (d. 2024)
- 6 October – Tony Greig, cricketer (d. 2012)
- 5 December – Sarel van der Merwe, former rally and racing driver
- 18 December – Steve Biko, anti-apartheid activist. (d. 1977)

== Deaths ==
- 24 January – Morris Alexander, politician (b. 1877)
- 13 April – William Henry Bell, musician, composer and first director of the South African College of Music. (b. 1873)

== Railways ==
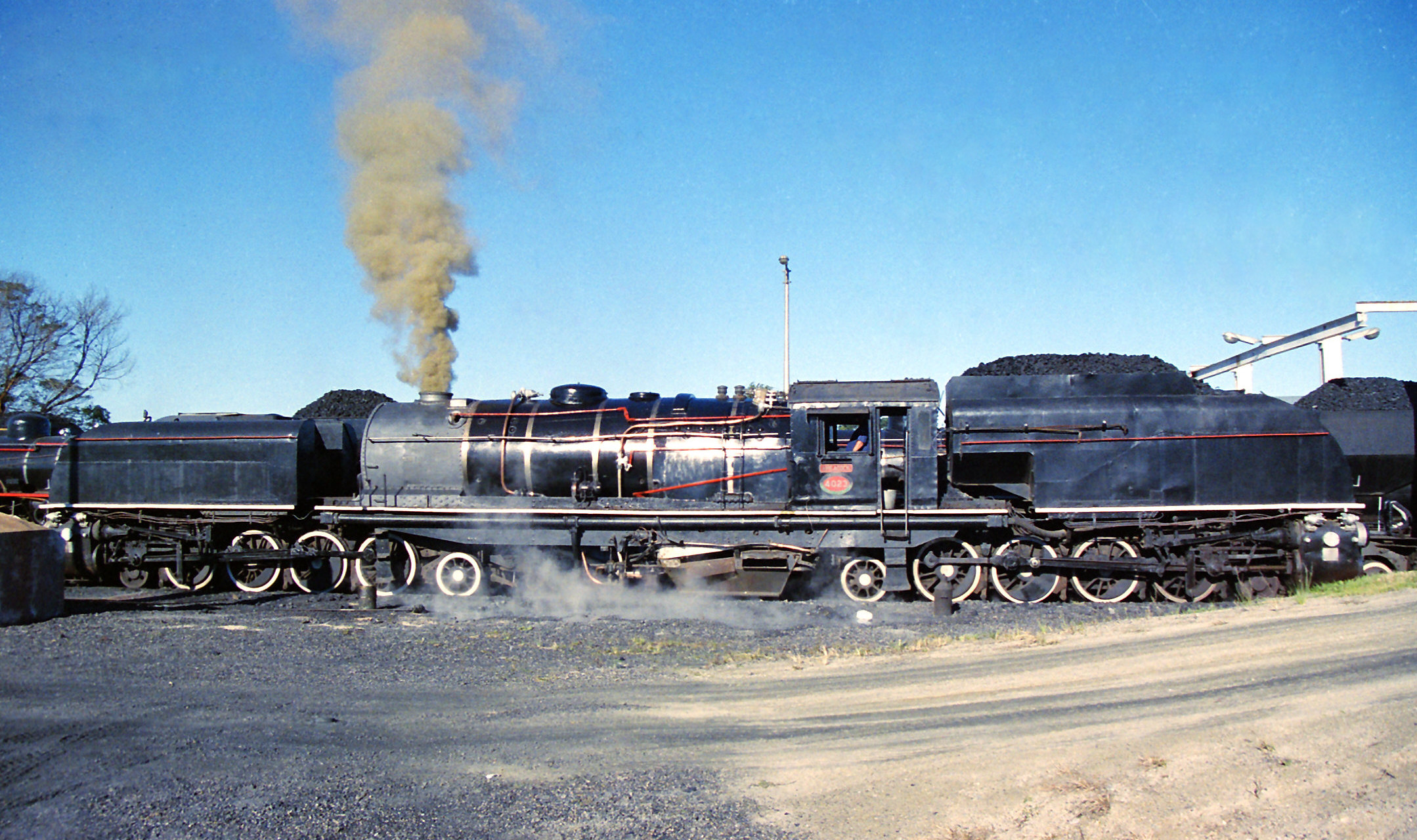
Class GEA

=== Railway lines opened ===
- 1 June – Transvaal: Ogies to Vandyksdrif, 21 miles 30 chains (34.4 kilometres).

=== Locomotives ===
- The South African Railways places the first of fifty Class GEA 4-8-2+2-8-4 Garratt locomotives in service.
