= 1944 in South Africa =

- Decades: 1920s; 1930s; 1940s; 1950s; 1960s
- See also: List of years in South Africa

The following lists events that happened during 1944 in South Africa.

== Incumbents ==
- Monarch: King George VI.
- Governor-General and High Commissioner for Southern Africa: Nicolaas Jacobus de Wet.
- Prime Minister: Jan Christiaan Smuts.
- Chief Justice: Ernest Frederick Watermeyer.

== Events ==
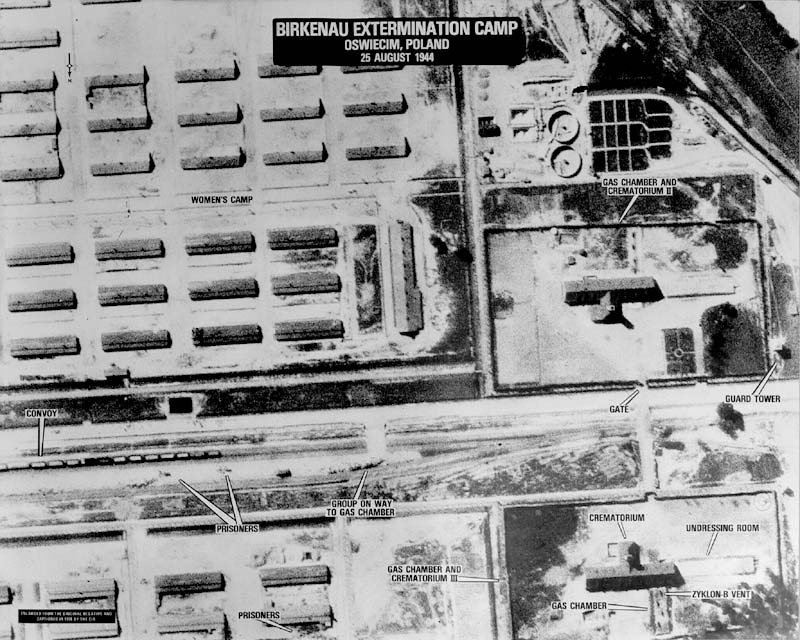
Photo of Auschwitz-Birkenau taken by 60 Sqn SAAF (Sortie no. 60PR/694 under U.S. Air Force command)

- 4 April – An Allied surveillance aircraft of 60 Squadron SAAF photographs part of Auschwitz concentration camp.

== Births ==
- 12 January – Eileen KaNkosi-Shandu, leader of the Inkatha Women Brigade.
- 27 February – Graeme Pollock, former cricketer & cricket administrator
- 3 March – Jerrold Kessel, South-African-born Israeli journalist and author. (d. 2011)
- 9 March – Lee Irvine, cricketer
- 23 June – Clive Barker (soccer), 1996 Africa Cup of Nations winning coach

== Deaths ==
- 19 September – Johannes Jacobus le Roux, Second World War fighter pilot, dies in an aircraft accident in France.

== Railways ==
- The Namaqualand Railway line from Port Nolloth to O'okiep is closed.
