= 1941 in South Africa =

- Decades: 1920s; 1930s; 1940s; 1950s; 1960s
- See also: List of years in South Africa

The following lists events that happened during 1941 in South Africa.

== Incumbents ==
- Monarch: King George VI.
- Governor-General and High Commissioner for Southern Africa: Sir Patrick Duncan
- Prime Minister: Jan Christiaan Smuts.
- Chief Justice: James Stratford then Nicolaas Jacobus de Wet.

== Events ==
May

- 28 – Jan Smuts, Prime Minister of South Africa, is appointed as a Field Marshal of the British Army.
- The 13-year-old George Bizos, with his father, help 7 New Zealand soldiers escape Nazi occupied Greece to Crete.

December

- 8 – The Union of South Africa declares war on Finland, Romania, Hungary and Japan.
- 31 – The Union of South Africa declares war on Bulgaria.

== Births ==
- 30 January – Henry Cele, actor (d. 2008)
- 31 January – Eugène Terre'Blanche, Afrikaner right-wing founder of the Afrikaner Weerstandsbeweging. (d. 2010)
- 2 April – Njongonkulu Ndungane, Anglican bishop & a former prisoner on Robben Island
- 30 June – Peter Pollock, cricketer, brother of cricket administrator Graeme Pollock, father of cricketer Shaun Pollock
- 28 August – Joseph Shabalala, musician & founder of Ladysmith Black Mambazo (d. 2020)
- 2 September – David Bale, businessman, father of Christian Bale and husband of Gloria Steinem. (d. 2003)
- 6 September – Monica Mason, ballet dancer and administrator
- 10 September – Christo Wiese, businessman and former billionaire, chairman of Pepkor
- 25 September – Rick Turner, activist and academic. (d. 1978)

== Deaths ==
- 20 April – Pat Pattle DFC and Bar, fighter pilot. (b. 1914)
- 11 June – Andries Abraham Stockenström le Fleur, Griqua leader and visionary.
- 17 September – Newell Orton, fighter pilot.
