= R v Peverett =

South African legal case

- Court: Appellate Division
- Full case name: Rex Respondent v Peverett Appellant
- Decided: 26 March 1940
- Citation: 1940 AD 213

Case history
- Appealed from: Durban and Coast Local Division

Court membership
- Judges sitting: De Wet CJ, Watermeyer JA, Tindall JA, Centlivres JA, and Feetham JA

Case opinions
- Criminal law, Attempted murder, suicide, Intention
- Decision by: Watermeyer JA

R v Peverett is an important case in South African criminal law, heard on March 7, 1940. The appellant's attorneys were Renaud & Mooney, Durban, and Kannemeyer & Jeffreys, Bloemfontein.

== Facts ==
The accused and one Edna Saunders, at the latter's suggestion, decided to commit suicide by introducing into a closed motor car poisonous fumes from the exhaust pipe of the car. The accused made the necessary arrangements. He and Saunders then sat in the car, and the accused started the engine. They both lost consciousness but were later removed from the car and eventually recovered. The accused was convicted of attempted murder. The case came to the Appellate Division as an appeal upon a question of law reserved by Carlisle J, presiding with assessors at the Criminal Sessions of the Durban and Coast Local Division.

== Arguments ==
TB Turner, for the appellant, argued that neither suicide nor attempt to commit suicide is a crime in South Africa. If accused was merely an accessory to attempted suicide, he committed no crime. There was no intent to kill; therefore accused did not attempt murder.

LC Barrett, for the Crown, contended that a person cannot in law consent to his life being taken by the other party to a suicide pact. If the other kills him in the execution of such pact, such killing is unlawful. The question whether suicide is or is not a crime was irrelevant, he contended; alternatively, he argued that suicide was not a crime in South African law.

== Judgment ==
The appeal was dismissed. The court held that the fact that Saunders was free to breathe the poisonous gas or not as she pleased did not free the accused from criminal responsibility for his acts. The accused had contemplated and expected that, as a consequence of his acts, Saunders would die; he therefore intended to kill her, however little he may have desired her death.

Watermeyer JA observed that Van der Linden's statement in his notes to Voet seems to differ from his statement in the Institutes. As regards a person who attempted to commit suicide, it was doubtful whether he thereby committed a crime in South African law.

The evidence showed that the accused had the intention to kill. He actually set about encompassing the death of Saunders; his acts went beyond mere preparation. In English law, attempted suicide was a misdemeanour according to Rex v Doody, but according to Rex v Mann, it was a felony. A change of mind after his acts had amounted to an attempt could not avail him.

== See also ==
- Crime
- Law of South Africa
- South African criminal law
