= Wattville =

- Location within Gauteng Location within South Africa
- Coordinates: 26.222°S 28.303°E
- Country: South Africa
- Province: Gauteng
- Municipality: Ekurhuleni

Area
  - Total: 2.17 km^{2} (0.84 sq mi)

Population (2011)
  - Total: 25,667
  - Density: 11,800/km^{2} (30,600/sq mi)

Racial makeup (2011)
  - Black African: 99.0%
  - Coloured: 0.3%
  - Indian/Asian: 0.1%
  - White: 0.1%
  - Other: 0.5%

First languages (2011)
  - Zulu: 47.8%
  - Sotho: 13.0%
  - Northern Sotho: 10.4%
  - Xhosa: 7.3%
  - Other: 21.6%
- Time zone: UTC+2 (SAST)
- Postal code (street): 1501
- PO box: 1516

Wattville is a township south of Benoni in Ekurhuleni Metropolitan municipality, Gauteng, South Africa. It was established in 1941, and by 1948, 400 houses were built on 34 hectares. After 1948, building stopped as it was threatened with destruction. This was because it was considered too close to a white town. However, building continued in 1951 and by 1955 about 2,000 new houses had been erected. The former ANC president Oliver Tambo lived here during the 1950s with his wife Adelaide. Mrs Tambo continued to serve the community and the local Anglican Church congregation, donating food parcels every year to the local senior citizens until her death in 2008. She was buried next to her late husband in Wattville. A housing area was established in honour of the iconic couple, named Tamboville, with more than 800 families and still growing due to the influx of people into the township.

In 2001, the Department of Social Development approved the establishment of a Development Centre in Wattville. The community of Wattville, who have been consulted from the initiation about the Development Centre concept, saw it fit to name the Centre "Adelaide Tambo Development Centre. "It was to honour Dr. Adelaide Tambo's direct socio-economic involvement in Wattville.
