= 1951 in South Africa =

- Decades: 1930s; 1940s; 1950s; 1960s; 1970s
- See also: List of years in South Africa

The following lists events that happened during 1951 in South Africa.

== Incumbents ==
- Monarch: King George VI.
- Governor-General: Ernest George Jansen (starting 1 January).
- Prime Minister: Daniel François Malan.
- Chief Justice: Albert van der Sandt Centlivres.

== Events ==
March

- 30 – The Group Areas Act, passed in 1950, becomes law.

May

- 14 – Cabinet votes for the removal of Coloured people from the voters roll.
- 24 – The first part of the Afrikaans Dictionary Woordeboek van die Afrikaanse Taal (WAT) is published, a project which was begun in 1926 by Prof. J.J. Smith of Stellenbosch University.

July

- 29 – Blacks, Coloureds and Indians meet for the first time to discuss a plan of action against race discrimination laws.

August

- 31 – The first Volkswagen Beetle rolls off the plant in Uitenhage.

Unknown date

- Max Theiler, virologist, is awarded the Nobel Prize in Physiology or Medicine for developing a vaccine for yellow fever, the first South African to receive a Nobel Prize.

== Births ==
- 3 January – Frank Chikane, civil servant, writer and cleric
- 17 February – Patricia De Lille, current Minister of Public Works and Infrastructure (South Africa) and leader of the political party Good
- 9 March – Helen Zille, federal council chairperson of the Democratic Alliance (South Africa)
- 26 July – Pieter Mulder, politician and the former leader of the Freedom Front Plus
- 1 December – Nozipho Schroeder, lawn bowler

== Deaths ==
- 6 April – Robert Broom, the Scottish paleontologist who discovered Mrs Ples. (b. 1866)
- 23 May – Sefako Makgatho, the 2nd African National Congress president. (b. 1861)
- 14 October – Herman Charles Bosman, writer and journalist. (b. 1905)
- 5 November – Reggie Walker, athlete (b. 1889)
- 28 November – Clements Kadalie, trade unionist. (b. 1896)

== Railways ==
=== Railway lines opened ===
- 13 June – Transvaal: Grootvlei to Redan, 39 miles 1 chain (62.8 kilometres).
- 21 December – Transvaal: Springs to Welgedag, 5 miles 19 chains (8.4 kilometres).

== Sports ==
=== Canoeing ===
- 22 December – The first 200 kilometre Dusi Marathon, with four pairs of canoeists taking part, starts on the Umsindusi River which joins the Umgeni River in the Valley of a Thousand Hills. Since only Ian Player stays the course and finishes, it is declared that there is no winner.

=== Rugby ===
- 8 December – The Springboks beat Ireland 17–5 in Ireland.
