= Wemmer =

- Wemmer's location in Gauteng
- Coordinates: 26°12′55″S 28°02′45″E
- Country: South Africa
- Province: Gauteng
- City: Johannesburg
- Established: 1919

Area
  - Total: 0.26 km^{2} (0.10 sq mi)

Wemmer is a suburb of Johannesburg, South Africa, around 800 m south-southeast of City Hall.

The covers around 0.26 km^{2} north and south of the M2 highway (the Francois Oberholzer Freeway). It borders Selby to the west and southwest, Marshalltown and Salisbury Claims to the north, Village Main to the east, and New Centre to the southeast.

Wemmer was founded in 1919 on the lands of the new exhausted Wemmer gold mine, which was on Turffontein Farm. The mine, in turn, was named after Sam Wemmer (1846–1933), who made R40,000/yr from it but still died a pauper; nearby Wemmer Pan was named after him as well.

== Sources ==
- Raper, Peter Edmund (2004). New Dictionary of South African Place Names. Johannesburg/Cape Town: Jonathan Ball Publishers.
- Stals, Prof. Dr. E.L.P (ed.) (1978). Afrikaners in die Goudstad, vol. 1: 1886 - 1924. Cape Town/Pretoria: HAUM.
