= New Centre (disambiguation) =

New Centre or New Center may refer to:

- New Centre, a centre-right political party in France.
- New Centre (Andorra), a former political party in Andorra.
- New Center, Detroit, a neighborhood in Detroit, Michigan, United States.
- New Centre, Gauteng, a suburb of Johannesburg, South Africa.
- New Centre (Latvia), a centre-left political party in Latvia.

== See also ==
- New Centre-Right, political party in Italy
