= Sea Point (House of Assembly of South Africa constituency) =

South African constituency

- Seepunt
- Former constituency for the South African House of Assembly
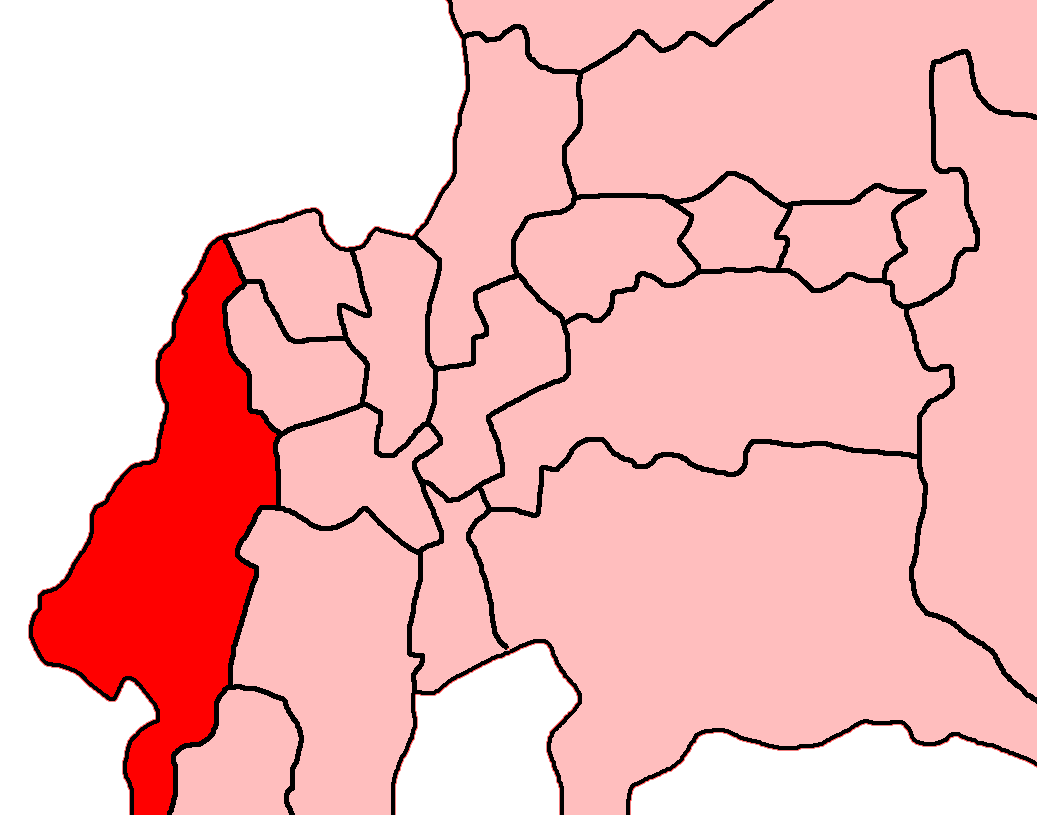
- Location of Sea Point within Cape Town (1981)
- Province: Cape of Good Hope
- Electorate: 17,521 (1989)

Former constituency
- Created: 1929
- Abolished: 1994
- Number of members: 1
- Last MHA: Colin Eglin (DP)
- Created from: Cape Town Harbour
- Replaced by: Western Cape

Sea Point (Afrikaans: Seepunt) was a constituency in the Cape Province of South Africa, which existed from 1929 to 1994. It covered parts of the Cape Town seashore, centred on its namesake suburb of Sea Point. Throughout its existence it elected one member to the House of Assembly and one to the Cape Provincial Council.

== Franchise notes ==
When the Union of South Africa was formed in 1910, the electoral qualifications in use in each pre-existing colony were kept in place. The Cape Colony had implemented a "colour-blind" franchise known as the Cape Qualified Franchise, which included all adult literate men owning more than £75 worth of property (controversially raised from £25 in 1892), and this initially remained in effect after the colony became the Cape Province. As of 1908, 22,784 out of 152,221 electors in the Cape Colony were "Native or Coloured". Eligibility to serve in Parliament and the Provincial Council, however, was restricted to whites from 1910 onward.

The first challenge to the Cape Qualified Franchise came with the Women's Enfranchisement Act, 1930 and the Franchise Laws Amendment Act, 1931, which extended the vote to women and removed property qualifications for the white population only – non-white voters remained subject to the earlier restrictions. In 1936, the Representation of Natives Act removed all black voters from the common electoral roll and introduced three "Native Representative Members", white MPs elected by the black voters of the province and meant to represent their interests in particular. A similar provision was made for Coloured voters with the Separate Representation of Voters Act, 1951, and although this law was challenged by the courts, it went into effect in time for the 1958 general election, which was thus held with all-white voter rolls for the first time in South African history. The all-white franchise would continue until the end of apartheid and the introduction of universal suffrage in 1994.

== History ==
When first created, Sea Point was a geographically compact seat consisting largely of Sea Point itself, but it expanded southward over the course of its existence, so that as of the final boundary review in 1980, it extended as far south as Hout Bay. Throughout these changes, the electorate remained largely English-speaking, affluent and liberal, resembling those of the neighbouring Southern Suburbs region.

Its first MP was Gideon Brand van Zyl, who had previously represented Cape Town Harbour. Van Zyl represented the seat until 1942, when he resigned to take up the post of Administrator of the Cape Province. His successors, C. B. M. Abbott and J. A. L. Basson, both represented the United Party, which was dominant in Sea Point as in much of Cape Town. Basson faced increasingly stiff opposition, however, from Progressive Party candidate (and party leader) Colin Eglin, who finally succeeded in winning the seat in 1974, upon Basson's resignation. Eglin would hold the seat until its abolition in 1994, and remained a member of the multiracial, proportionally-elected National Assembly until 2004.

== Members ==
Election	Member	Party
1929	Gideon Brand van Zyl	South African
1933	Gideon Brand van Zyl	South African
1934	Gideon Brand van Zyl	United
1938	Gideon Brand van Zyl	United
1943 by	C. B. M. Abbott	United
1943	C. B. M. Abbott	United
1948	C. B. M. Abbott	United
1953	C. B. M. Abbott	United
1958	J. A. L. Basson	United
1961	J. A. L. Basson	United
1966	J. A. L. Basson	United
1970	J. A. L. Basson	United
1974	Colin Eglin	Progressive
1977	Colin Eglin	PFP
1981	Colin Eglin	PFP
1987	Colin Eglin	PFP
1989	Colin Eglin	Democratic
1994	constituency abolished	

== Detailed results ==
=== Elections in the 1920s ===
General election 1929: Sea Point
Party	Candidate	Votes	%	±%
South African	Gideon Brand van Zyl	Unopposed		
South African win (new seat)				

=== Elections in the 1930s ===
General election 1933: Sea Point
Party	Candidate	Votes	%	±%
South African	Gideon Brand van Zyl	2,885	49.9	N/A
Independent	W. F. Fish	2,852	49.3	New
Rejected ballots		45	0.8	N/A
Majority		33	0.6	N/A
Turnout		5,782	69.4	N/A
South African hold		Swing	N/A	

General election 1938: Sea Point
Party	Candidate	Votes	%	±%
United	Gideon Brand van Zyl	4,800	78.2	+28.3
Dominion	G. Parker	1,320	21.5	New
Rejected ballots		19	0.3	N/A
Majority		3,480	56.7	N/A
Turnout		6,139	73.4	N/A
United hold		Swing	N/A	

=== Elections in the 1940s ===
Sea Point by-election, 11 January 1943
Party	Candidate	Votes	%	±%
United	C. B. M. Abbott	Unopposed		
United hold				

General election 1943: Sea Point
Party	Candidate	Votes	%	±%
United	C. B. M. Abbott	Unopposed		
United hold				
