= Cape Town Harbour (House of Assembly of South Africa constituency) =

- Kaapstad-Hawe
- Former constituency for the South African House of Assembly
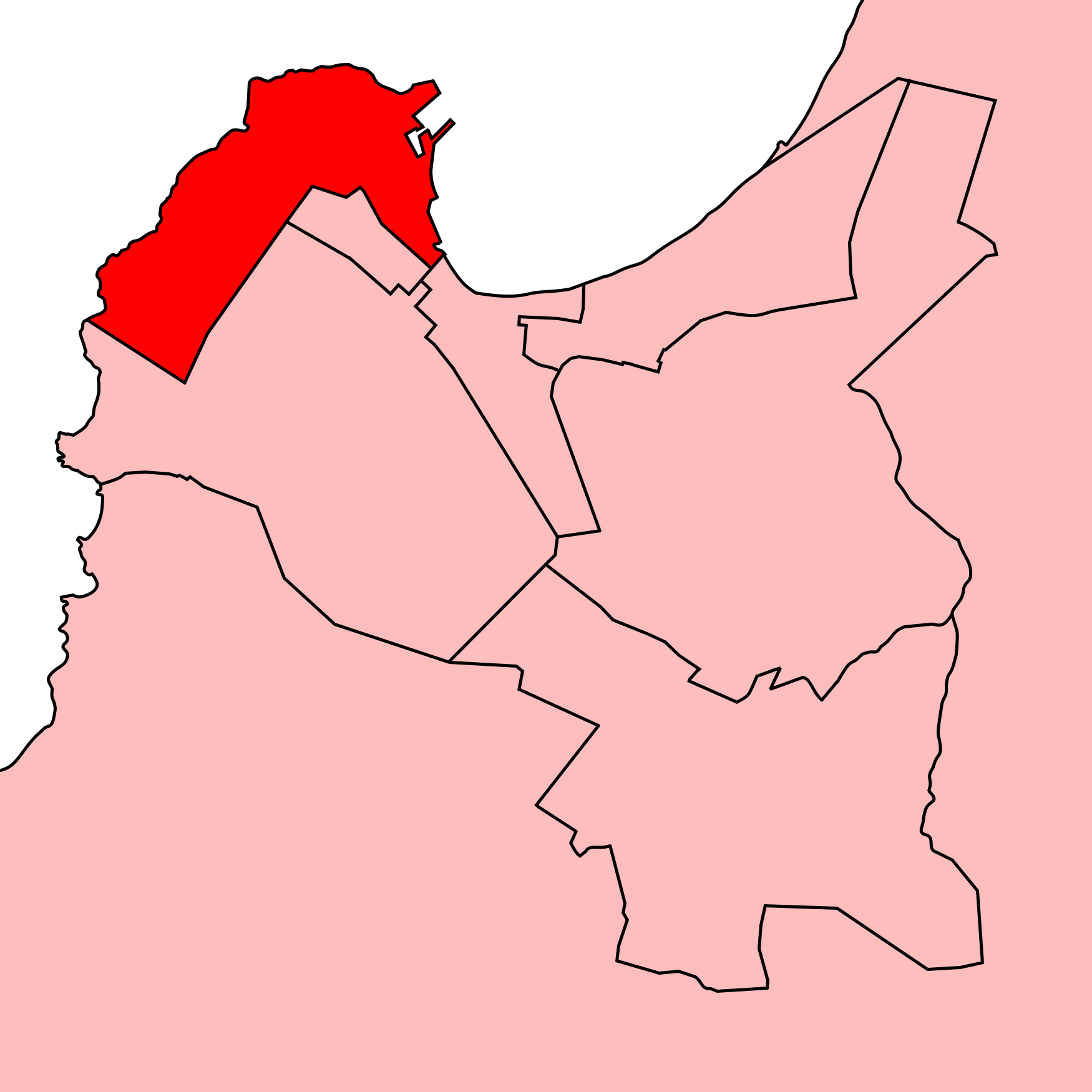
- Location of Cape Town Harbour within Cape Town (1910)
- Province: Cape of Good Hope
- Electorate: 4,753 (1924)

Former constituency
- Created: 1910
- Abolished: 1929
- Number of members: 1
- Last MHA: Gideon Brand van Zyl (SAP)
- Replaced by: Sea Point

Cape Town Harbour (Afrikaans: Kaapstad-Hawe) was a constituency in the Cape Province of South Africa, which existed from 1910 to 1929. It covered an area along the coast of Cape Town, including parts of the CBD as well as the Sea Point area. Throughout its existence it elected one member to the House of Assembly and one to the Cape Provincial Council.

== Franchise notes ==
When the Union of South Africa was formed in 1910, the electoral qualifications in use in each pre-existing colony were kept in place. The Cape Colony had implemented a "colour-blind" franchise known as the Cape Qualified Franchise, which included all adult literate men owning more than £75 worth of property (controversially raised from £25 in 1892), and this initially remained in effect after the colony became the Cape Province. As of 1908, 22,784 out of 152,221 electors in the Cape Colony were "Native or Coloured". Eligibility to serve in Parliament and the Provincial Council, however, was restricted to whites from 1910 onward.

The first challenge to the Cape Qualified Franchise came with the Women's Enfranchisement Act, 1930 and the Franchise Laws Amendment Act, 1931, which extended the vote to women and removed property qualifications for the white population only – non-white voters remained subject to the earlier restrictions. In 1936, the Representation of Natives Act removed all black voters from the common electoral roll and introduced three "Native Representative Members", white MPs elected by the black voters of the province and meant to represent their interests in particular. A similar provision was made for Coloured voters with the Separate Representation of Voters Act, 1951, and although this law was challenged by the courts, it went into effect in time for the 1958 general election, which was thus held with all-white voter rolls for the first time in South African history. The all-white franchise would continue until the end of apartheid and the introduction of universal suffrage in 1994.

== History ==
Cape Town Harbour was one of the four constituencies created out of the multi-member Cape Town seat for the Cape Parliament. At the time, it covered the CBD north of Strand Street and west of Adderley Street, as well as the seaside suburbs of Sea Point and Green Point. With a few minor changes (the seat gained Clifton and lost parts of the CBD), these boundaries would essentially remain until the seat's abolition in 1929.

Like the rest of Cape Town, it was a largely English-speaking seat and loyal to the pro-British side of South African politics. In the first general election, it was won handily by Unionist Party leader Leander Starr Jameson – however, Jameson was also elected unopposed in Albany, and chose to represent that seat, causing a by-election in Cape Town Harbour that was won by party colleague Henry Juta. Juta was replaced at the 1915 general election by Lawrence Woodhead, and in a 1918 by-election by Gideon Brand van Zyl, who would represent the seat until its abolition, joining the South African Party in 1921 when the Unionists merged with them. On the abolition of the seat, van Zyl stood for and won the new seat of Sea Point, which he represented until his appointment as Administrator of the Cape Province in 1942.

== Members ==
Election	Member	Party
1910	Leander Starr Jameson	Unionist
1910 by	Henry Juta	Unionist
1915	Lawrence Woodhead	Unionist
1918 by	Gideon Brand van Zyl	Unionist
1920	Gideon Brand van Zyl	Unionist
1921	Gideon Brand van Zyl	South African
1924	Gideon Brand van Zyl	South African
1929	constituency abolished	

== Detailed results ==
=== Elections in the 1910s ===
General election 1910: Cape Town Harbour
Party	Candidate	Votes	%	±%
Unionist	Leander Starr Jameson	1,414	70.1	New
South African	J. W. Herbert	602	29.9	New
Majority		812	40.2	N/A
Unionist win (new seat)				

Cape Town Harbour by-election, 2 November 1910
Party	Candidate	Votes	%	±%
Unionist	Henry Juta	Unopposed		
Unionist hold				

General election 1915: Cape Town Harbour
Party	Candidate	Votes	%	±%
Unionist	Lawrence Woodhead	2,092	74.2	+4.1
Labour	A. F. Betty	726	25.8	New
Majority		812	48.4	N/A
Turnout		2,818	59.3	N/A
Unionist hold		Swing	N/A	

Cape Town Harbour by-election, 20 December 1918
Party	Candidate	Votes	%	±%
Unionist	Gideon Brand van Zyl	1,071	56.7	−17.5
Labour	A. F. Betty	607	32.1	+6.3
South African	G. Pearce	212	11.2	New
Majority		464	24.6	N/A
Turnout		1,890	41.2	−18.1
Unionist hold		Swing	-11.9	

=== Elections in the 1920s ===
General election 1920: Cape Town Harbour
Party	Candidate	Votes	%	±%
Unionist	Gideon Brand van Zyl	1,234	53.3	−20.9
Labour	A. F. Betty	1,080	46.7	+20.9
Majority		154	7.6	−41.8
Turnout		2,314	53.7	−6.6
Unionist hold		Swing	-20.9	

General election 1921: Cape Town Harbour
Party	Candidate	Votes	%	±%
South African	Gideon Brand van Zyl	1,754	70.9	+17.6
Labour	A. F. Betty	719	29.1	−17.6
Majority		1,035	41.8	+35.2
Turnout		2,473	55.4	+1.7
South African hold		Swing	+17.6	

General election 1924: Cape Town Harbour
Party	Candidate	Votes	%	±%
South African	Gideon Brand van Zyl	2,112	63.2	−7.7
Labour	C. S. Playfair	1,167	34.9	+5.8
Rejected ballots		62	1.9	N/A
Majority		945	28.3	−13.5
Turnout		3,341	70.2	+14.8
South African hold		Swing	-6.8	
