= Fordsburg (House of Assembly of South Africa constituency) =

- Former constituency for the South African House of Assembly
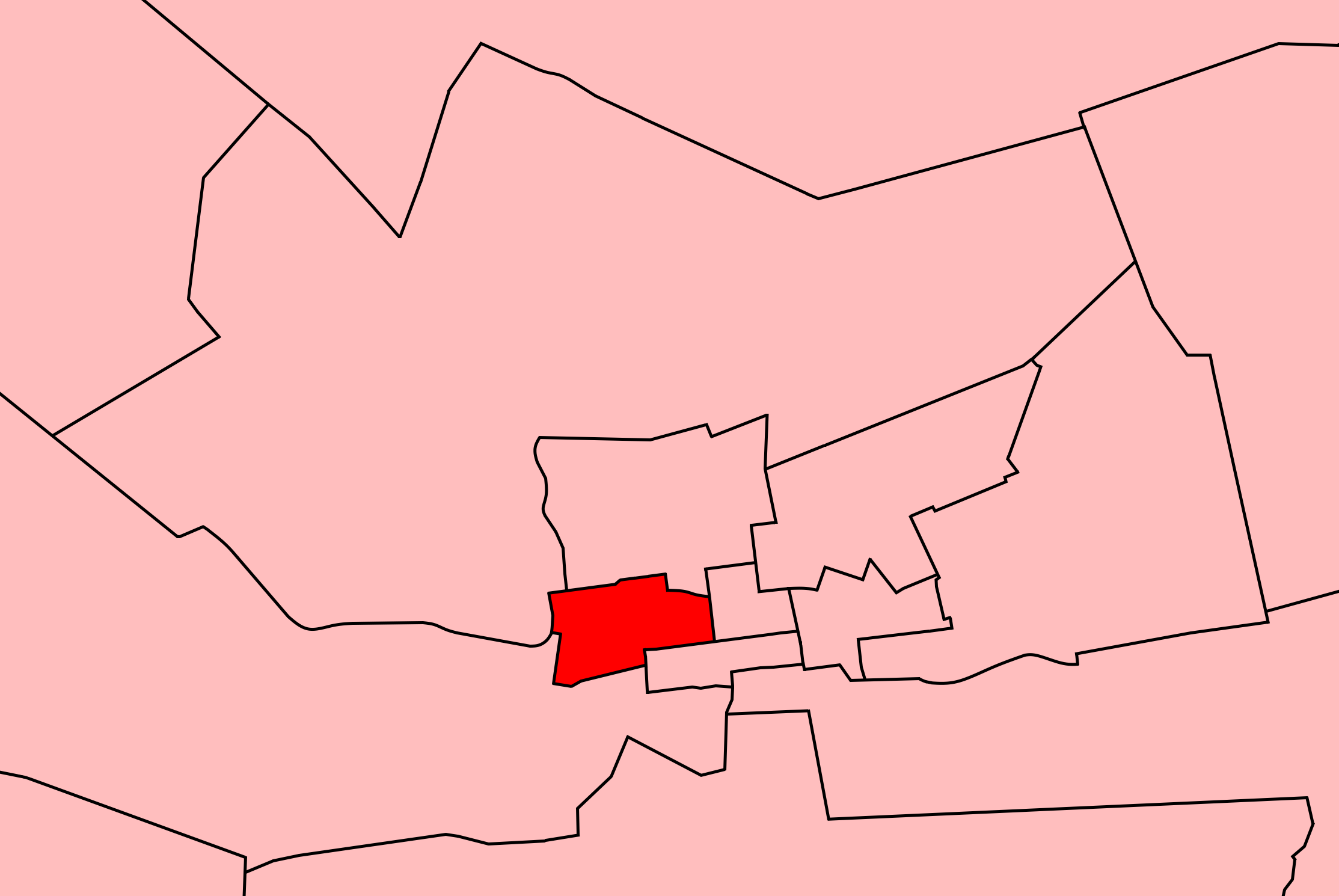
- Location of Fordsburg within Johannesburg (1910)
- Province: Transvaal
- Electorate: 9,313 (1943)

Former constituency
- Created: 1910
- Abolished: 1948
- Number of members: 1
- Last MHA: D. C. Burnside (Lab)

Fordsburg was a constituency in the Transvaal Province of South Africa, which existed from 1910 to 1948. It covered parts of the inner western suburbs of Johannesburg, centred on the suburb of Fordsburg. Throughout its existence it elected one member to the House of Assembly and one to the Transvaal Provincial Council.

== Franchise notes ==
When the Union of South Africa was formed in 1910, the electoral qualifications in use in each pre-existing colony were kept in place. In the Transvaal Colony, and its predecessor the South African Republic, the vote was restricted to white men, and as such, elections in the Transvaal Province were held on a whites-only franchise from the beginning. The franchise was also restricted by property and education qualifications until the 1933 general election, following the passage of the Women's Enfranchisement Act, 1930 and the Franchise Laws Amendment Act, 1931. From then on, the franchise was given to all white citizens aged 21 or over. Non-whites remained disenfranchised until the end of apartheid and the introduction of universal suffrage in 1994.

== History ==
Fordsburg was a largely working-class seat, and was closely fought between the Labour Party and various non-socialist candidates. Its first MP was a young Patrick Duncan, later a cabinet minister under Jan Smuts and Governor-General for much of the Second World War. Its long-serving Nationalist MP, Jacobus Stephanus François Pretorius, followed J. B. M. Hertzog into the United Party in 1934, and was succeeded by party colleague Barend Jacobus Schoeman (later a cabinet minister for the National Party) in 1938. In 1943, it was given to Labour as part of an electoral pact between them and the UP, and former Umbilo Socialist Party MP Duncan Campbell Burnside held the seat until its abolition in 1948.

== Members ==
Election	Member	Party
1910	Patrick Duncan	Unionist
1915	Patrick Duncan	Unionist
1920	Morris Kentridge	Labour
1921	Jacobus Stephanus François Pretorius	National
1924	Jacobus Stephanus François Pretorius	National
1929	Jacobus Stephanus François Pretorius	National
1933	Jacobus Stephanus François Pretorius	National
1934	Jacobus Stephanus François Pretorius	United
1938	Barend Jacobus Schoeman	United
1940	Barend Jacobus Schoeman	HNP
1943	Duncan Campbell Burnside	Labour
1948	Constituency abolished	

== Detailed results ==
=== Elections in the 1910s ===
General election 1910: Fordsburg
Party	Candidate	Votes	%	±%
Unionist	Patrick Duncan	590	35.5	New
Het Volk	Frederick Edward Traugott Krause	544	32.7	New
Labour	William Henry Andrews	520	31.3	New
Socialist	Archibald Crawford	8	0.5	New
Majority		46	2.8	N/A
Unionist win (new seat)				

General election 1915: Fordsburg
Party	Candidate	Votes	%	±%
Unionist	Patrick Duncan	724	45.9	+10.4
Labour	D. Dingwell	465	29.4	−1.9
National	J. S. F. Pretorius	390	24.7	New
Majority		259	16.5	N/A
Turnout		1,579	71.4	N/A
Unionist hold		Swing	N/A	

=== Elections in the 1920s ===
General election 1920: Fordsburg
Party	Candidate	Votes	%	±%
Labour	Morris Kentridge	804	45.2	+15.8
National	Jacobus Stephanus François Pretorius	592	33.3	+8.6
Unionist	Patrick Duncan	365	20.5	−25.4
Independent	Harry Martin Barendregt	19	1.1	New
Majority		212	11.9	N/A
Turnout		1,780	53.2	−18.2
Labour gain from Unionist		Swing	+20.6	

General election 1921: Fordsburg
Party	Candidate	Votes	%	±%
National	Jacobus Stephanus François Pretorius	729	37.9	+4.6
Labour	Morris Kentridge	647	33.6	−11.6
South African	Hugh Hunter McLean	549	28.5	New
Majority		82	4.3	N/A
Turnout		1,925	55.9	+2.7
National gain from Labour		Swing	+8.1	

General election 1924: Fordsburg
Party	Candidate	Votes	%	±%
National	J. S. F. Pretorius	1,412	61.5	+23.6
South African	Harry Graumann	845	36.8	+8.3
Rejected ballots		39	1.7	N/A
Majority		567	24.7	N/A
Turnout		2,296	77.3	+21.4
National hold		Swing	+7.7	

General election 1929: Fordsburg
Party	Candidate	Votes	%	±%
National	J. S. F. Pretorius	1,257	59.4	−2.1
South African	H. L. Lindsay	821	38.8	+2.0
Rejected ballots		38	1.8	+0.1
Majority		436	20.6	−4.1
Turnout		2,116	73.9	−3.4
National hold		Swing	-2.1	

=== Elections in the 1930s ===
General election 1933: Fordsburg
Party	Candidate	Votes	%	±%
National	J. S. F. Pretorius	1,379	35.6	−24.3
Roos	G. C. V. Odendaal	1,266	32.7	New
Independent	C. A. Lagesen	1,185	30.6	New
Rejected ballots		41	1.1	-0.7
Majority		113	2.9	N/A
Turnout		3,871	61.9	−12.0
National hold		Swing	N/A	

General election 1938: Fordsburg
Party	Candidate	Votes	%	±%
United	Barend Jacobus Schoeman	2,582	51.1	+15.5
Labour	Thomas Chalmers Robertson	1,455	28.8	New
Purified National	M. van der Ahee	972	19.2	New
Rejected ballots		43	0.9	-0.2
Majority		113	2.9	N/A
Turnout		5,052	68.6	+6.7
United hold		Swing	N/A	
