= Maraisburg (House of Assembly of South Africa constituency) =

South African constituency, 1915–1920

- Former constituency for the South African House of Assembly
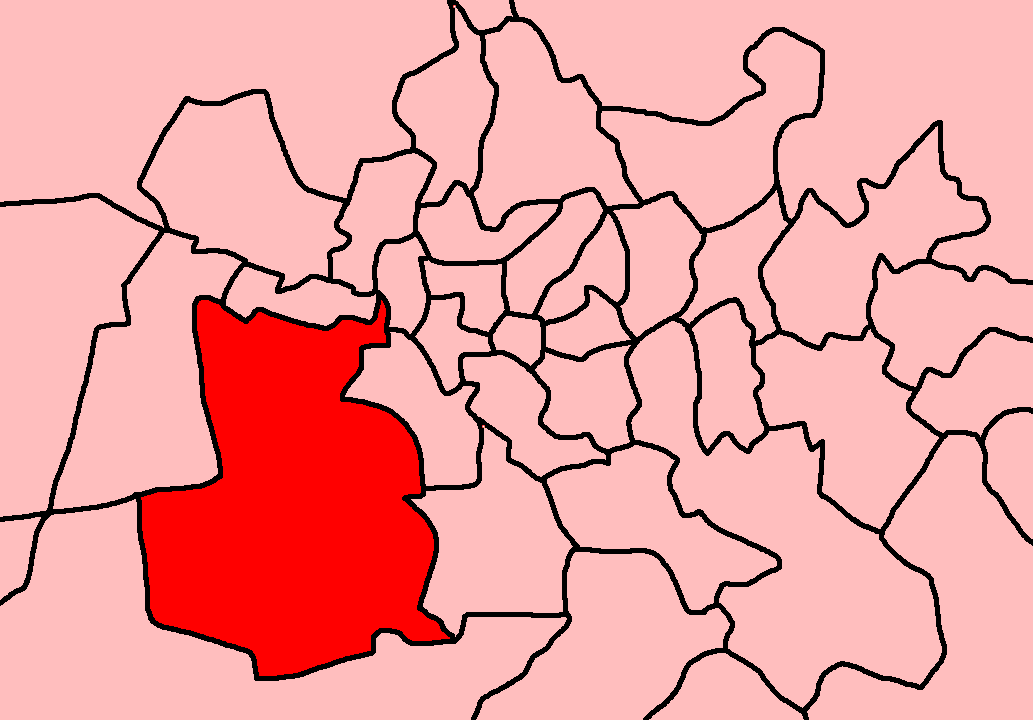
- Location of Maraisburg within the Witwatersrand (1981)
- Province: Transvaal
- Electorate: 20,405 (1989)

Former constituency
- Created: 1915; 1948
- Abolished: 1920; 1994
- Number of members: 1
- Last MHA: P. H. de la Rey (CP)
- Replaced by: Gauteng (1994)

Maraisburg was a constituency in the Transvaal Province of South Africa, which existed from 1915 to 1920 and again from 1948 to 1994. It covered a part of the West Rand centred on the Maraisburg section of Roodepoort. Throughout its existence it elected one member to the House of Assembly and one to the Transvaal Provincial Council.

== Franchise notes ==
When the Union of South Africa was formed in 1910, the electoral qualifications in use in each pre-existing colony were kept in place. In the Transvaal Colony, and its predecessor the South African Republic, the vote was restricted to white men, and as such, elections in the Transvaal Province were held on a whites-only franchise from the beginning. The franchise was also restricted by property and education qualifications until the 1933 general election, following the passage of the Women's Enfranchisement Act, 1930 and the Franchise Laws Amendment Act, 1931. From then on, the franchise was given to all white citizens aged 21 or over. Non-whites remained disenfranchised until the end of apartheid and the introduction of universal suffrage in 1994.

== History ==
The Maraisburg constituency was one of a handful of new seats created on the Witwatersrand for the 1915 general election and abolished just five years later. At its first election, it was won relatively comfortably by the governing South African Party's candidate, Willem van Hulsteyn, who had previously stood in Yeoville in 1910. It was abolished in 1920, at which point van Hulsteyn left parliament.

Maraisburg returned to the electoral map in 1948, just in time to help vote the Herenigde Nasionale Party into government. It was a safe seat for the governing party for most of its second iteration, and its longest-serving MP, Ben Schoeman, served as Minister of Transport from 1954 until his retirement in 1974. He was followed by a rapid succession of MPs, and in 1989, the seat fell to the Conservative Party. In its final boundaries, Maraisburg included much of Soweto, making it one of the largest constituencies in South Africa by total population, but its all-white electorate was not exceptionally large.

== Members ==
| Election | Member | Party |
|---|---|---|
| 1915 | Willem van Hulsteyn | South African |
| 1920 | Constituency abolished | |

| Election | Member | Party |
|---|---|---|
| 1948 | Ben Schoeman | HNP |
| 1953 | Ben Schoeman | National |
| 1958 | Ben Schoeman | National |
| 1961 | Ben Schoeman | National |
| 1966 | Ben Schoeman | National |
| 1970 | Ben Schoeman | National |
| 1974 | A. C. van Wyk | National |
| 1977 | A. C. van Wyk | National |
| 1981 | P. H. Pretorius | National |
| 1987 | J. J. Vilonel | National |
| 1989 | P. H. de la Rey | Conservative |
| 1994 | constituency abolished | |

== Detailed results ==
=== Elections in the 1910s ===
General election 1915: Maraisburg
| Party | Candidate | Votes | % | ±% |
|---|---|---|---|---|
| South African | Willem van Hulsteyn | 862 | 44.4 | New |
| National | J. Francken | 562 | 29.0 | New |
| Labour | N. Toomey | 516 | 26.6 | New |
| Majority | | 300 | 15.4 | N/A |
| Turnout | | 1,940 | 71.6 | N/A |
| South African win (new seat) | | | | |
