= Salisbury Claims =

- Location within Gauteng Location within South Africa
- Coordinates: 26.210°S 28.045°E
- Country: South Africa
- Province: Gauteng
- Municipality: City of Johannesburg
- Established: 1921
- Time zone: UTC+2 (SAST)
- Postal code (street): 2001

Salisbury Claims is a suburb of Johannesburg, South Africa. It is located in Region F of the City of Johannesburg Metropolitan Municipality.

== History ==
This small suburb lies just south of the Johannesburg CBD with Marshalltown to the north and Wemmer to the south. It was proclaimed a suburb on 26 October 1921. Prior to the discovery of gold on the Witwatersrand in 1886, the suburb lay on land on one of the original farms that make up Johannesburg, called Turffontein. Lying close to the Main Reef gold deposits, parts of the farm were proclaimed as a gold claim with the mine eventually called Salisbury Gold Mining Company. The area is now a mix of commercial and light industrial usage.
