= Whites, Free State =

Whites
- Location within Free State (South African province) Location within South Africa
- Coordinates: 28°S 27°E
- Country: South Africa
- Province: Free State
- District: Lejweleputswa
- Municipality: Matjhabeng

Area
  - Total: 3.46 km^{2} (1.34 sq mi)

Population (2011)
  - Total: 366
  - Density: 106/km^{2} (274/sq mi)

Racial makeup (2011)
  - Black African: 95.9%
  - Coloured: 3.0%
  - Indian/Asian: 0.3%
  - White: 0.8%

First languages (2011)
  - Sotho: 84.4%
  - Afrikaans: 4.6%
  - Sign language: 4.4%
  - Xhosa: 4.1%
  - Other: 2.5%
- Time zone: UTC+2 (SAST)

Whites is a settlement in Lejweleputswa District Municipality in the Free State province of South Africa.

Located near Hennenman, the settlement was the site of a cement factory of the Whites South Africa Cement Company dating back to 1913. The company is now owned by Lafarge as part of its South African division.
