= War Measures Act, 1942 =

1942 Act of the Parliament of South Africa

The War Measures Act, 1942 was an act of the Parliament of South Africa which empowered the Minister of Labour to intervene in any dispute designated as harmful to the war effort and impose a ban on strikes or lockouts. Strikes by Africans were punishable by a R1000 fine or three years imprisonment.
