= Albert van der Sandt Centlivres =

Chief Justice of South Africa (1887–1966)

The Honourable Albert van der Sandt Centlivres
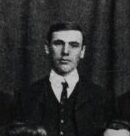
- Student Representative Council, South African College, 1906

10th Chief Justice of South Africa
- In office 1950–1957
- Appointed by: Gideon Brand van Zyl
- Preceded by: Ernest Frederick Watermeyer
- Succeeded by: Henry Allan Fagan

Judge of Appeal of the Supreme Court of South Africa
- In office 1939–1950
- Appointed by: Sir Patrick Duncan

Judge of the Cape Provincial Division
- In office 1935–1939
- Appointed by: The Earl of Clarendon

Personal details
- Born: 13 January 1887 Cape Town, Cape Colony
- Died: 19 September 1966 (aged 79) Cape Town, Cape Province, South Africa
- Education: South African College; New College, Oxford
- Occupation: Judge
- Profession: Lawyer

Albert van der Sandt Centlivres (13 January 1887 – 19 September 1966), was the Chief Justice of South Africa from 1950 to 1957.

== Biography ==
Centlivres was born in Newlands, Cape Town, the son of Frederick James Centlivres and Albertina de Villiers. He was educated at the South African College School, South African College (now the University of Cape Town), where he took honours in Classics, and New College, Oxford, where he was a Rhodes Scholar and read Law, graduating BA and BCL. He was called to the bar by the Middle Temple in 1910 and admitted as an advocate of the Cape provincial division in 1911. During the First World War, he served in South-West Africa as a private. He became a King's Counsel in 1927.

In 1935 he was appointed a judge of the Cape Provincial Division, and in 1939 he became a Judge of Appeal in the Appellate Division, South Africa's highest court. He was best known for his judgments during the Coloured vote constitutional crisis, in which he rebuffed the government's attempts at disenfranchising non-white voters in the Cape Province.

The painting Portrait of Albert van de Sandt Centlivres by Neville Lewis was burned by demonstrators during the Rhodes Must Fall upheaval at the University of Cape Town in February 2016.

== Centlivres Building ==
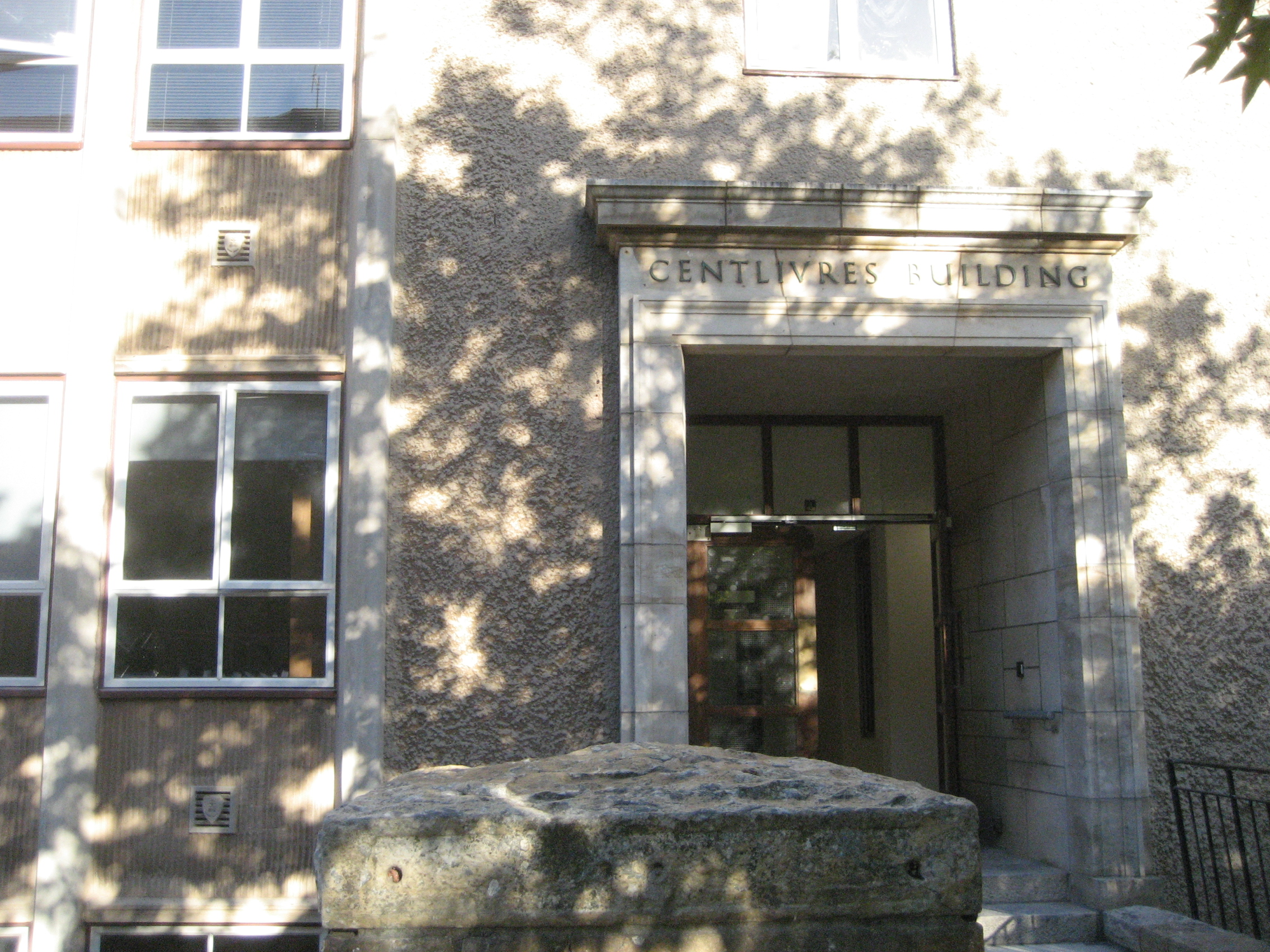
Centlivres Building, Cape Town University

Centlivres was Chancellor of the University of Cape Town from 1950 until his death in 1966. The Centlivres Building on the university's upper campus is named after him. The building houses faculty for the departments of sociology and architecture.

Legal offices
| Preceded by Ernest Frederick Watermeyer | Chief Justice of South Africa; 1950–1957 | Succeeded by Henry Allan Fagan |
Academic offices
| Preceded by Jan Smuts | Chancellor of the University of Cape Town; 1950–1966 | Succeeded by Harry Oppenheimer |
