= New Centre, Gauteng =

New Centre
- Location within Gauteng Location within South Africa
- Coordinates: 26.215°S 28.047°E
- Country: South Africa
- Province: Gauteng
- Municipality: City of Johannesburg
- Main Place: Johannesburg

Area
  - Total: 0.49 km^{2} (0.19 sq mi)

Population (2011)
  - Total: 338
  - Density: 690/km^{2} (1,800/sq mi)

Racial makeup (2011)
  - Black African: 98.2%
  - Coloured: 0.9%
  - Indian/Asian: 0.3%
  - Other: 0.6%

First languages (2011)
  - Zulu: 38.5%
  - Xhosa: 16.0%
  - Southern Ndebele: 6.8%
  - English: 5.0%
  - Other: 33.7%
- Time zone: UTC+2 (SAST)
- Postal code (street): 2001

New Centre is a suburb of Johannesburg, South Africa. It is located in Region F of the City of Johannesburg Metropolitan Municipality.
