= Village Main, Gauteng =

Village Main
- Location within Gauteng Location within South Africa
- Coordinates: 26.218°S 28.045°E
- Country: South Africa
- Province: Gauteng
- Municipality: City of Johannesburg
- Main Place: Johannesburg
- Established: 1924

Area
  - Total: 2.43 km^{2} (0.94 sq mi)

Population (2011)
  - Total: 53
  - Density: 22/km^{2} (56/sq mi)

Racial makeup (2011)
  - Black African: 96.2%
  - Coloured: 1.9%
  - White: 1.9%

First languages (2011)
  - Sotho: 26.4%
  - Zulu: 22.6%
  - Northern Sotho: 15.1%
  - English: 9.4%
  - Other: 26.4%
- Time zone: UTC+2 (SAST)
- Postal code (street): 2001

Village Main is a suburb of Johannesburg, South Africa. The suburb lies less than a kilometre south of the Johannesburg CBD. Once mining land, now consists of light industry and one of the city's main freeways, the M2 runs through the suburb. It is located in Region F of the City of Johannesburg Metropolitan Municipality.

== History ==
Prior to the discovery of gold on the Witwatersrand in 1886, the suburb lay on land on one of the original farms that make up Johannesburg, called Turffontein. Lying close to the Main Reef gold deposits the suburb was on mining land of the Village Main Reef Mining Gold Company. Was surveyed as a suburb in 1923 and proclaimed on 10 June 1924.
