= Nicolaas Jacobus de Wet =

South African politician, lawyer, and judge

The Right Honourable Nicolaas Jacobus de Wet QC
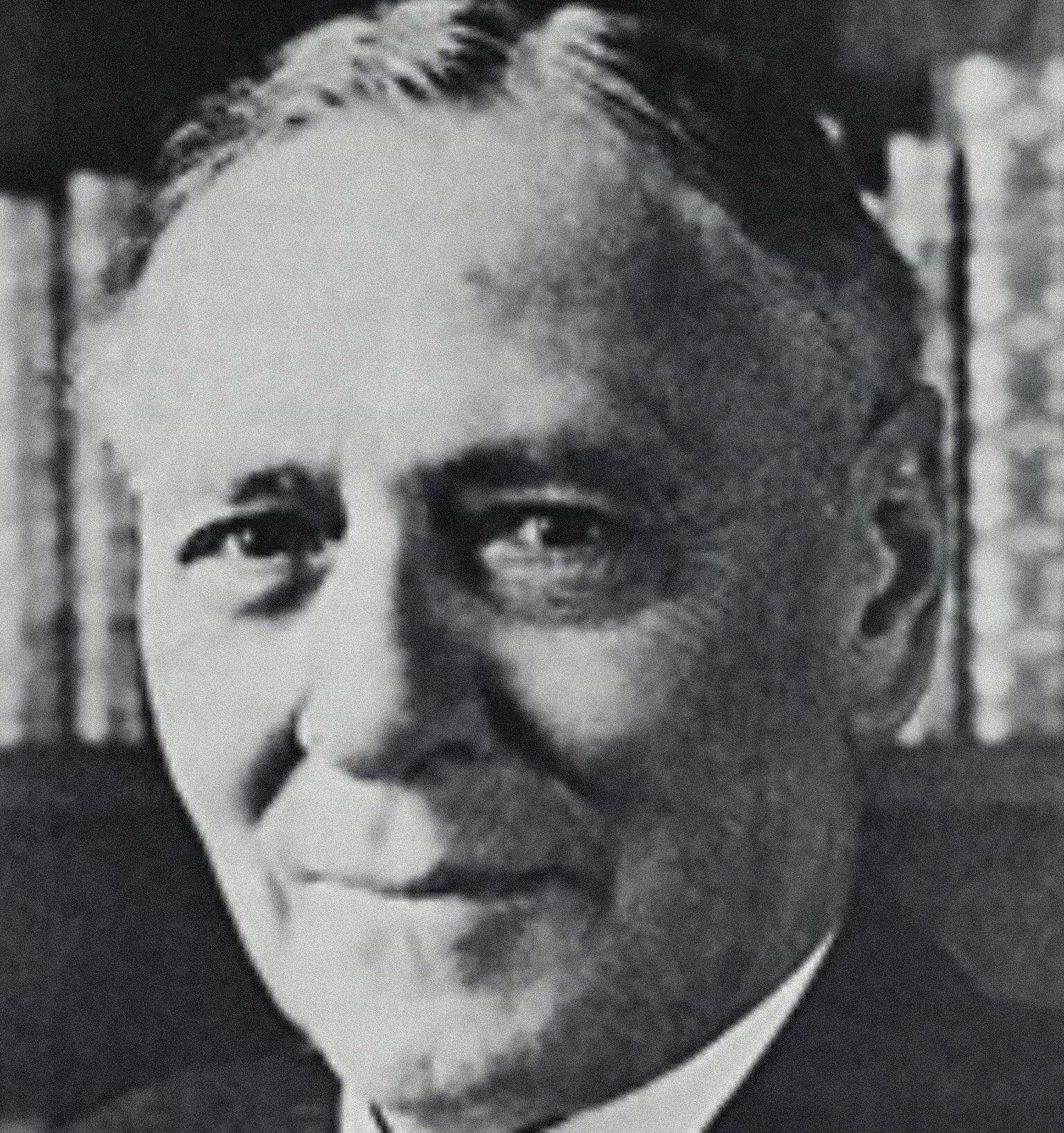
- De Wet c. 1945

Officer Administering the Government of South Africa (acting Governor-General of South Africa)
- In office 17 July 1943 – 1 January 1946
- Monarch: George VI
- Prime Minister: Jan Smuts
- Preceded by: Sir Patrick Duncan
- Succeeded by: Gideon Brand van Zyl

8th Chief Justice of South Africa
- In office 1939–1943
- Appointed by: Jan Smuts
- Preceded by: James Stratford
- Succeeded by: E. F. Watermeyer

Nicolaas Jacobus de Wet, PC, QC (11 September 1873 – 16 March 1960) was a South African politician, lawyer, and judge who was Chief Justice of South Africa and acting Governor-General from 1943 to 1945.

== Early life ==
De Wet was born and went to school in Aliwal North, and attended Victoria College in Stellenbosch. He then went to Downing College at the University of Cambridge, from which he earned his LLB (First Class, with the Chancellor's Medal) in 1895. He was admitted as an advocate (the South African equivalent of a barrister) in 1896. During the Anglo-Boer War he was military secretary to General Louis Botha, commandant-general of the Transvaal forces, and acted as an interpreter at the peace conference that ended the war in 1902.

== Political career ==
After the war, de Wet joined Botha in politics, and was a member of the Transvaal legislative assembly from 1907 to 1910. He was a legal adviser to the Transvaal delegation to the 1908-1909 National Convention that drew up the Constitution for the Union of South Africa. In 1913, he was appointed a King's Counsel. He was also a founder member of the Suid-Afrikaanse Akademie vir Wetenskap en Kuns ("South African Academy for Science and Art") in 1909.

De Wet was a member of the Union Parliament between 1913 and 1929, serving as a member of the House of Assembly from 1913 to 1920 and a Senator from 1920 to 1929. He served in the South African Party government as Minister of Justice from 1913 to 1924. As such, he had to deal with the legal aspects of an armed Afrikaner uprising against the government in 1914, and the 1922 Rand Revolt.

== Judicial career ==
De Wet was appointed a judge of the Supreme Court in 1932, a judge of the Appeal Court in 1937, and Chief Justice in 1939. As Chief Justice, he was required ex officio to act as Officer Administering the Government under a dormant commission, in the absence of the Governor-General, which he did for two and a half years, from the death of Sir Patrick Duncan in 1943 and the appointment of Gideon Brand van Zyl in 1945.

He was appointed a member of the Privy Council of the United Kingdom in 1939.

== Family life ==
De Wet was married twice. His first wife was Ella Scheepers, who is reputed to have composed the popular Afrikaans song Sarie Marais during the Anglo-Boer War. His second wife was Jakomina du Toit. He died in 1960. His son by his first marriage, Dr. Quartus de Wet, was also a judge, and presided over the 1963 Rivonia Treason Trial of Nelson Mandela and other anti-apartheid activists.

Political offices
Preceded by Sir Patrick Duncan	Governor-General of South Africa; 1943–1946	Succeeded by Gideon Brand van Zyl
Legal offices
Preceded by James Stratford	Chief Justice of South Africa; 1939–1943	Succeeded by E. F. Watermeyer
