= Patrick Duncan (South African politician) =

South African politician

The Right Honourable Sir Patrick Duncan GCMG, KStJ, PC KC
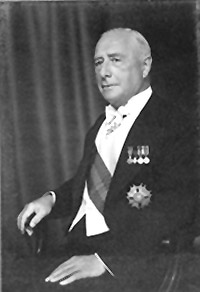

6th Governor-General of South Africa
- In office 5 April 1937 – 17 July 1943
- Monarch: George VI
- Prime Minister: J. B. M. Hertzog; Jan Smuts
- Preceded by: The Earl of Clarendon
- Succeeded by: Nicolaas Jacobus de Wet (acting); Gideon Brand van Zyl

Minister for the Interior, Education and Public Health
- In office February 1921 – 30 June 1924
- Prime Minister: Jan Smuts
- Preceded by: Thomas Watt; F. S. Malan (Education)
- Succeeded by: Daniel François Malan

Member of Parliament for Yeoville
- In office 14 January 1921 – 23 November 1936
- Preceded by: A. E. A. Williamson
- Succeeded by: Maldwyn Edmund

Member of Parliament for Fordsburg
- In office 1 October 1910 – 31 December 1920
- Preceded by: constituency created
- Succeeded by: Morris Kentridge

Personal details
- Born: 21 December 1870 Fortrie, Banffshire, Scotland
- Died: 17 July 1943 (aged 72) Pretoria, Transvaal, South Africa
- Party: Unionist Party; South African Party; United Party
- Spouse(s): Alice Dold, Lady Duncan
- Education: University of Edinburgh; Balliol College, Oxford

Sir Patrick Duncan, GCMG, KStJ, PC, KC (21 December 1870 – 17 July 1943) was the sixth Governor-General of the Union of South Africa, holding office from 1937 until his death in 1943.

== Early life ==
Born in Scotland in 1870, he took degrees in classics at the University of Edinburgh and at Balliol College, Oxford, and studied law in the Inner Temple, before joining the British civil service in 1894 as a Clerk of the Upper Division in the Secretaries' Office for Inland Revenue.

== Colonial service ==
In 1901, during the Anglo-Boer War (1899–1902), he was recruited by Viscount Milner, to join a team of young administrators – known as "Milner's Kindergarten" – to govern and anglicise the British-occupied Transvaal. He was Colonial Secretary of the Transvaal from 1903 until the colony was granted self-government in 1907, playing an important part in the repatriation of ex-prisoners of war, and in the social and financial reconstruction of the former Boer state.

Duncan practised as an attorney from 1907 to 1910, and was a legal adviser to the Transvaal delegation to the 1908-1909 National Convention that drew up the South Africa Act that established the Union of South Africa.

== Political career ==
He was a member of the Union Parliament from 1910 to 1936, first as a member of the Unionist Party, then of the South African Party and its successor the United Party. He was Minister of Education, the Interior, and Public Health in the SAP administration from 1921 to 1924, and Minister of Mines in the UP administration from 1933 to 1936.

== Governor-General of South Africa ==
Duncan was appointed Governor-General in 1937, the first South African citizen appointee to hold the post. King George VI, whom he represented as head of state, knighted him and appointed him to the Imperial Privy Council of the United Kingdom.

Although widely respected and above party politics, he made himself controversial in 1939 by refusing to call a general election on the question of whether or not the Union should enter World War II. The prime minister, J.B.M. Hertzog, a former Boer general, wanted to stay neutral, but Parliament, including most members of his own party, supported his deputy, Jan Smuts. Like Hertzog, Smuts had also famously commanded Boer forces, but nonetheless favored entering the war on the side of the Allies. Sir Patrick's refusal to call a new election rendered Hertzog a lame duck; after losing a vote of no-confidence he resigned from office. Sir Patrick swiftly commissioned Smuts to form a new government.

With Smuts as Prime Minister, South Africa entered the war as a loyal ally of Great Britain. South Africa's entry into World War II triggered both short and long term political re-alignments that eventually led to Smuts being forced out of politics after the war and South Africa withdrawing from the British Commonwealth on 31 May 1961. However, Sir Patrick would never witness these events transpire, dying in office in 1943. His ashes were interred in a monument at the new Duncan Dock in Cape Town harbour, which was named after him. The informal township of Duncan Village in East London, and the suburb of Duncanville near Vereeniging, were also named after him.

== Family ==
Sir Patrick married Alice Dold in 1916. They had three sons and a daughter. One son, Andrew (1920–1942), was killed on active service in Libya. Another son, Patrick (1918–1967), was a well-known anti-apartheid activist.

== Honours ==
Viceregal styles of Sir Patrick Duncan
- Reference style: His Excellency
- Spoken style: Your Excellency

Knight Grand Cross of the Order of St Michael and St George (GCMG)	1937
Companion of the Order of St Michael and St George (CMG)	KB 1904
Knight of the Venerable Order of St John of Jerusalem (KStJ)	KB 1937
King George V Coronation Medal	1911
King George V Silver Jubilee Medal	1935
King George VI Coronation Medal	1937

== Sources ==
- Dictionary of South African Biography Volume I
- Standard Encyclopedia of Southern Africa Volume 4
- Lavin, Deborah, ed. (2010). Friendship and union. The South African letters of Patrick Duncan and Maud Selborne, 1907-1943. Cape Town: Van Riebeeck Society. ISBN 978-0981426419.

Government offices
Preceded by Walter Edward Davidson	Colonial Secretary of the Transvaal; 1903–1907	Succeeded by Jan Smuts
House of Assembly of South Africa
New constituency	Member of Parliament for Fordsburg; 1910–1920	Succeeded by Morris Kentridge
Preceded by Dr William Davies	Member of Parliament for Yeoville; 1921–1936	Succeeded by Henry Gluckman
Political offices
Preceded by Thomas Watt	Minister for the Interior; 1921–1924	Succeeded by Daniel François Malan
Preceded by François Stephanus Malan	Minister of Education; 1921–1924	Succeeded by Daniel François Malan
Preceded by Thomas Watt	Minister for Public Health; 1921–1924	Succeeded by Daniel François Malan
Preceded by Adriaan Paulus Johannes Fourie as Minister of Mines and Industry	Minister of Mines; 1933–1936	Succeeded by Jan Hendrik Hofmeyr
Government offices
Preceded by The Earl of Clarendon	Governor-General of South Africa; 1937–1943	Succeeded by Nicolaas Jacobus de Wet
