= Gideon Brand van Zyl =

Governor-General of South Africa from 1945 to 1950

The Right Honourable Gideon Brand van Zyl
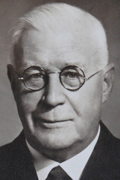

7th Governor-General of South Africa
- In office 1 January 1946 – 1 January 1951
- Monarch: George VI
- Prime Minister: Jan Smuts; D. F. Malan
- Preceded by: Sir Patrick Duncan; Nicolaas Jacobus de Wet (acting)
- Succeeded by: Ernest George Jansen

Personal details
- Born: 3 June 1873 Cape Town, Cape Colony
- Died: 1 November 1956 (aged 83) London, England
- Other political affiliations: Unionist Party (South Africa)

Gideon Brand van Zyl, PC (Afrikaans pronunciation: [ˈbrænt fan ˈzɛil]; 3 June 1873 – 1 November 1956) was Governor-General of the Union of South Africa from 1945 to 1950.

Born in Cape Town, he was the son of a prominent attorney, and he joined the family firm after qualifying at the University of Cape Town. During the Anglo-Boer War (1899–1902), he was a legal adviser to the British War Office.

In World War I (1914–1918), he was Deputy Director of War Recruiting, and served in the Cape Peninsula Garrison Regiment (a home defence unit).

Van Zyl entered politics in 1915, as a member of the Unionist Party. He was a member of the Cape Provincial Council (the provincial legislature) until 1918, and then a member of Parliament until 1942. He was Deputy Speaker from 1934 to 1942 (the Speaker being Dr Ernest George Jansen, who was later also governor-general).

From 1942 to 1945, Van Zyl was Administrator of the Cape Province. He served as Governor-General from 1945 until 1950. He was appointed to the Privy Council of the United Kingdom in 1945. In 1947, he hosted King George VI and the British royal family when they toured South Africa.

Van Zyl married Marie Fraser in 1900. He died in 1956.

Political offices
Preceded by Nicolaas Jacobus de Wet	Governor-General of South Africa; 1946–1950	Succeeded by Ernest George Jansen
World Organization of the Scout Movement
Preceded by	Chief Commissioner, Boy Scouts of South Africa –1951	Succeeded by Herbert Stanley
