= Monarchy of South Africa =

- Coat of arms of South Africa

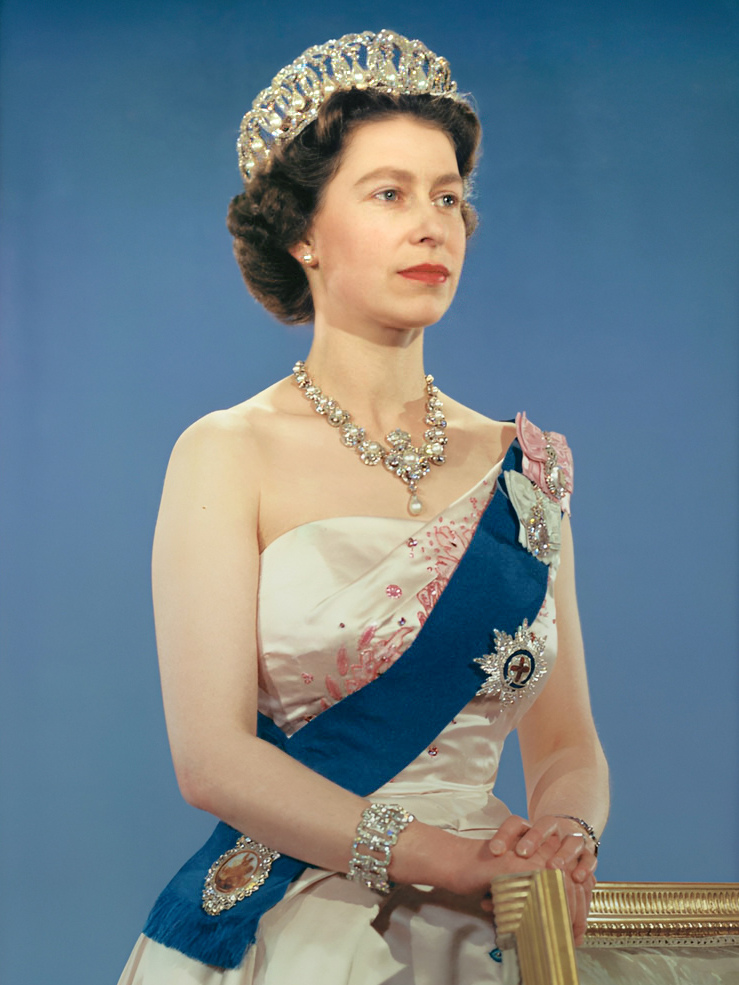
- Last to reign Elizabeth II; 6 February 1952 – 31 May 1961

Details
- Style: His Majesty (1910–1952); Her Majesty (1952–1961)
- First monarch: George V
- Last monarch: Elizabeth II
- Formed: 31 May 1910
- Abolished: 31 May 1961

From 1910 to 1961 the Union of South Africa was a self-governing country that shared a monarch with the United Kingdom and other Dominions of the British Empire. The monarch's constitutional roles were mostly delegated to the governor-general of the Union of South Africa.

The South Africa Act 1909 united four British colonies: Cape of Good Hope, Natal, Orange River Colony and Transvaal, to form the Union of South Africa with the monarch as its head of state. In 1947, King George VI became the first reigning monarch to visit South Africa. His successor, Queen Elizabeth II was granted a distinct South African style and title by the Parliament of South Africa in 1953.

South Africa became a republic and left the Commonwealth on 31 May 1961. On 1 June 1994, South Africa rejoined the Commonwealth as a republic, after the end of apartheid.

== Origin ==
In the aftermath of the Anglo-Boer War (1899–1902), Britain re-annexed the South African Republic and the Orange Free State, two hitherto independent Boer republics. These new territories, renamed the Transvaal Colony and the Orange River Colony respectively, were added to Britain's existing South African territories, the Cape Colony and Colony of Natal. It was British government policy to encourage these four colonies to come together in closer union; after the grant of responsible government to the Transvaal Colony and Orange River Colony in 1907, this aspiration was one that was also increasingly held by the Afrikaner population.

These political forces resulted in the 1908 National Convention, which met on 12 October 1908 and completed its work on 11 May 1909. This convention settled on the terms and constitution of a governmental, legislative, and economic Union. These proposals were transmitted to the British government, which duly prepared a bill to give effect to these wishes. The bill was approved by the four colonial parliaments in June 1909, and was passed by the Parliament of the United Kingdom on 20 September 1909, and the Union of South Africa was established on 31 May 1910.

== Development of shared monarchy ==
The South Africa Act 1909 united four British colonies: Cape of Good Hope, Natal, Orange River Colony and Transvaal, to form the Union of South Africa as a British Dominion with the monarch as its head of state.

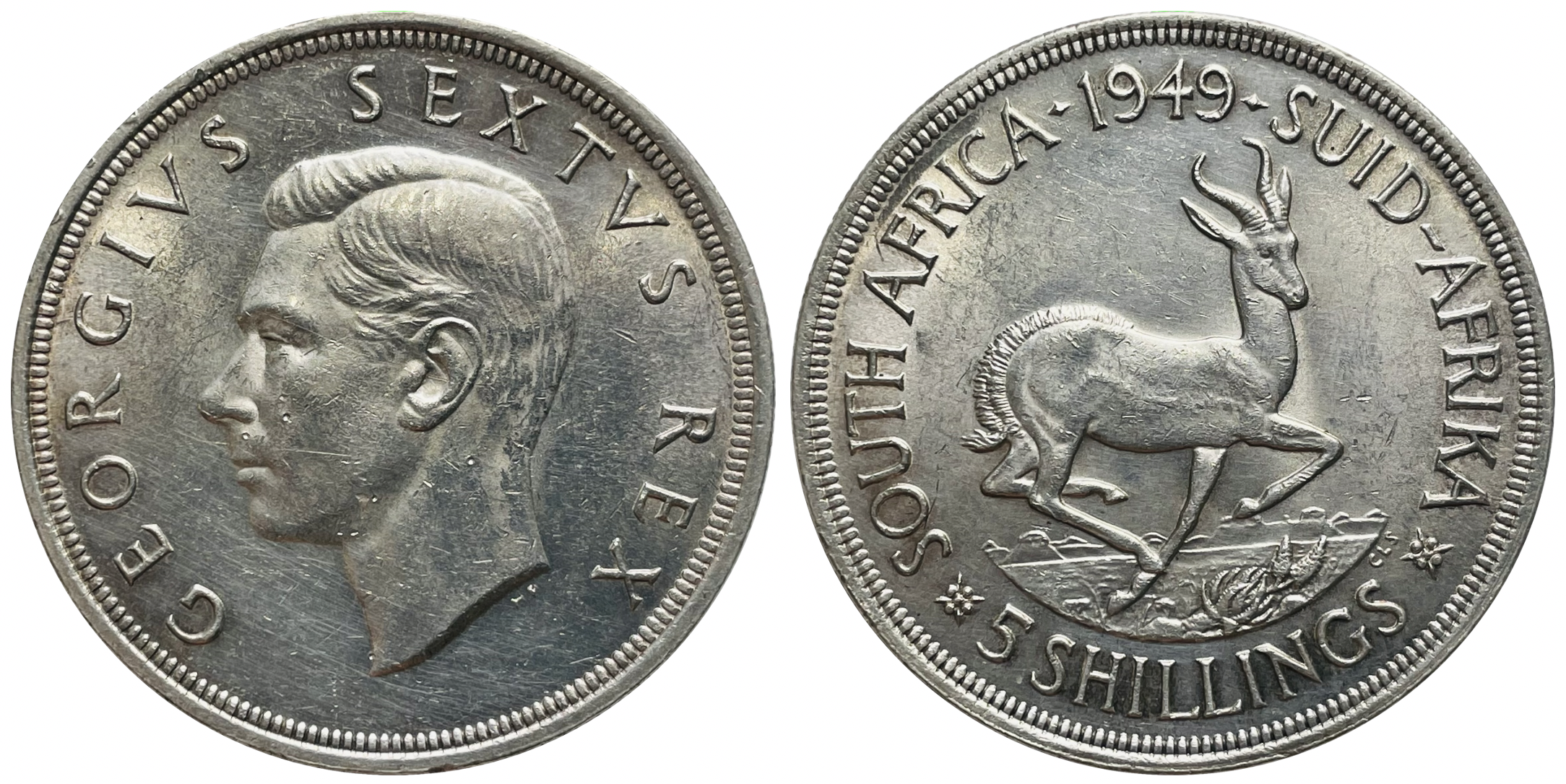
Five-shilling coin featuring King George VI, 1949

The Balfour Declaration of 1926 provided the dominions the right to be considered equal to Britain, rather than subordinate; an agreement that had the result of, in theory, a shared Crown that operated independently in South Africa rather than a unitary British Crown under which all the dominions were secondary. The monarchy thus ceased to be an exclusively British institution, and henceforth became a "domesticated" establishment. The Statute of Westminster 1931 further increased the sovereignty of the self-governing Dominions, and also bound them all to seek each other's approval for changes to monarchical titles and the common line of succession. As the statute removed nearly all of the British parliament's authority to legislate for the Dominions, it had the effect of making the Dominions largely sovereign nations in their own right.

Although the Union of South Africa was not among the Dominions that needed to adopt the Statute of Westminster for it to take effect, the Status of the Union Act, 1934 was passed to confirm South Africa's status as a fully sovereign state. It declared the Union of South Africa to be a "sovereign independent state" and explicitly adopted the Statute of Westminster into South African law.

=== Title ===
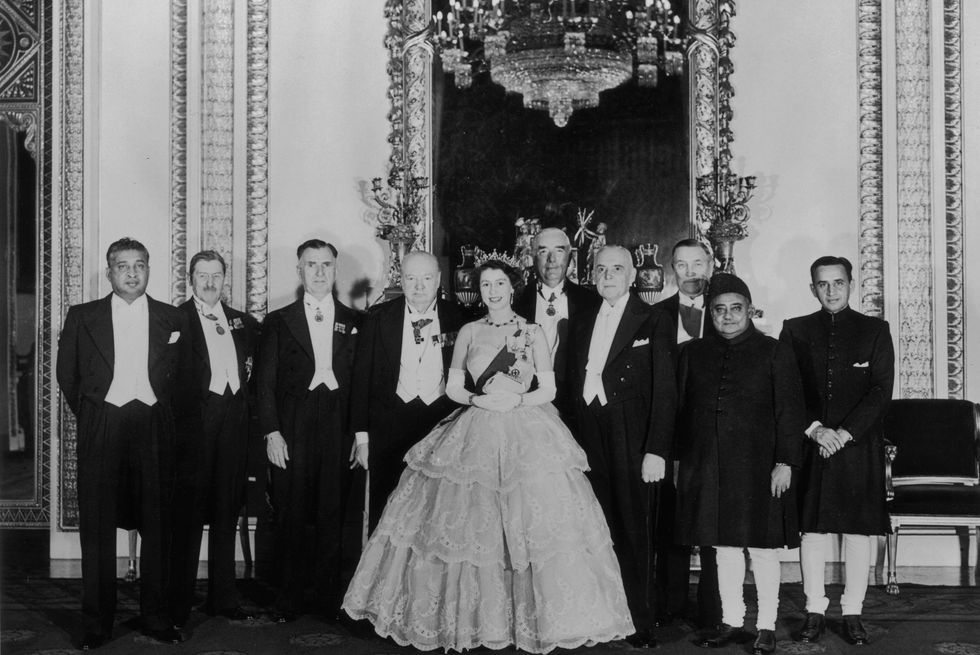
Queen Elizabeth II with the Commonwealth prime ministers during their conference in December 1952

Until the early part of the 20th century, the monarch's title throughout the British Empire was determined exclusively by the Parliament of the United Kingdom. The preamble to the Statute of Westminster 1931 established the convention requiring the consent of all the Dominions' parliaments, as well as that of the United Kingdom, to any alterations to the monarch's style and title. It had been decided among the realms in 1949 that each should have its own monarchical title, but with common elements. At the 1952 Commonwealth Prime Ministers' Economic Conference, Commonwealth prime ministers agreed that each member of the Commonwealth "should use for its own purposes a form of the Royal Style and Titles which suits its own particular circumstances but retains a substantial element which is common to all". It was decided that the monarch's title in all her realms have, as their common element, the description of the Sovereign as "Queen of Her Realms and Territories and Head of the Commonwealth". The parliament of each realm passed its own Royal Style and Titles Act before Elizabeth's coronation in June of the following year.

The Royal Style and Titles Act 1953, passed by the Parliament of South Africa, rendered the Queen's South African style and title in three languages:

- In English: Elizabeth II, Queen of South Africa and of Her other Realms and Territories, Head of the Commonwealth
- In Afrikaans: Elizabeth II, Koningin van Suid-Afrika en van Haar ander Koninkryke en Gebiede, Hoof van die Statebond
- In Latin: Elizabeth II, Africae Australis regnorumque suo rum ceterorum Regina, consortionis populorum Princeps

=== Succession ===
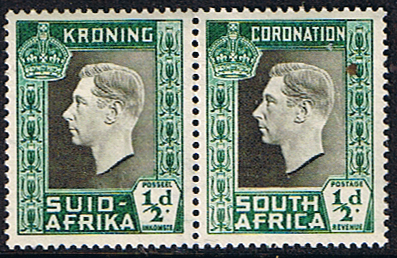
South African stamps commemorating the coronation of George VI, 1937

By convention, succession in South Africa was deferred to the laws of the United Kingdom; whoever was monarch of Britain was automatically the monarch of South Africa. Succession in Britain was by male-preference primogeniture governed by common law, the Act of Settlement 1701, and the Bill of Rights 1689. These legislations limited the succession to the natural (i.e. non-adopted), legitimate descendants of Sophia, Electress of Hanover, and stipulated that the monarch cannot be a Roman Catholic and must be in communion with the Church of England upon ascending the throne. However, the United Kingdom and the British Dominions agreed, via adopting the Statute of Westminster, not to change the rules of succession without the unanimous consent of the other realms, unless explicitly leaving the shared monarchy relationship. For instance, in 1937, the Parliament of South Africa had to pass the His Majesty King Edward the Eighth's Abdication Act, 1937 to ratify the abdication of King Edward VIII and the succession to the throne of King George VI, that occurred in December 1936.

Upon a demise of the Crown (the death or abdication of a sovereign), it was customary for the accession of the new monarch to be publicly proclaimed by the governor-general after the accession. Regardless of any proclamations, the late sovereign's heir immediately and automatically succeeded, without any need for confirmation or further ceremony. An appropriate period of mourning also followed, after which the new monarch was crowned in an ancient ritual in the United Kingdom.

== Constitutional role ==
Like all nations, you have hard problems to solve in the aftermath of war; but statesmanship has not failed you in the past 100 years, and I am confident it will guide you steadily towards a just and contented relationship between all dwellers in your many-people land. By achieving such a relationship you can show to the troubled world how peoples of different race and colour may live and work together for the common good.

— King George VI, 1947

The structure of the government of the Union of South Africa was similar to the government of other dominions. The monarch was represented in the Union by the governor-general of South Africa.

=== Executive ===
All executive authority was vested in the monarch, and was exercised by the governor-general on the monarch's behalf. The governor-general appointed an Executive Council, to advise him on how to execute the executive powers in the government of the Union. All executive councillors held office during the viceroy's pleasure.

Though not explicitly provided for by the South Africa Act, the office of Prime Minister of South Africa was also established as the head of government and, like other government ministers, the prime minister was required to be a member of either house of Parliament. As in other British Dominions, the governor-general appointed the leader of the largest political party in the lower house of Parliament as prime minister.

The governor-general additionally appointed members of the Executive Council as ministers to administer departments of State of the Union.

=== Parliament ===
The legislative power of the Union was vested in the Parliament, which consisted of the monarch, a Senate, and a House of Assembly.

The monarch and the governor-general did not, however, participate in the legislative process; they only took part in the granting of royal assent. The viceroy could return any bill presented to him by the House, with certain amendments he might recommend. The viceroy could also withhold assent, or reserve the bill for the signification of the monarch's pleasure. The monarch also had the power to disallow any act within one year after it was assented by the governor-general. After the granting of royal assent, the Clerk of the House of Assembly was responsible for enrolling two copies of the act, one in English and the other in Dutch, in the records of the office of the Registrar of the Appellate Division of the Supreme Court of South Africa.

Further, the constitution outlined that the governor-general alone was responsible for appointing senators. Every senator and every member of the House of Assembly was required to make an oath or affirmation of allegiance to the monarch before taking office.

I, (name), do swear that I will be faithful and bear true allegiance to His [or Her] Majesty [specify the name of the reigning Sovereign], His [or Her] heirs and successors according to law. So help me God.

— Oath of Allegiance to the Sovereign of South Africa

The governor-general was also responsible for summoning, proroguing, and dissolving parliament.

=== Courts ===
The South Africa Act established a Supreme Court for the Union. The Chief Justice of South Africa, the ordinary judges of appeal, and all other judges of the Supreme Court were appointed by the governor-general.

In case of incapacity of any judge, the governor-general could appoint any other judge of the Supreme Court of South Africa to temporarily discharge the required duties as the case may be.

In the legal profession, the Bar was divided into Queen's Counsel and advocates; following the establishment of a republic in 1961, it was divided into Senior Counsel and advocates.

== Cultural role ==
The Sovereign's Birthday was commemorated on the second Monday in July with a public holiday.

=== The Crown and Honours ===
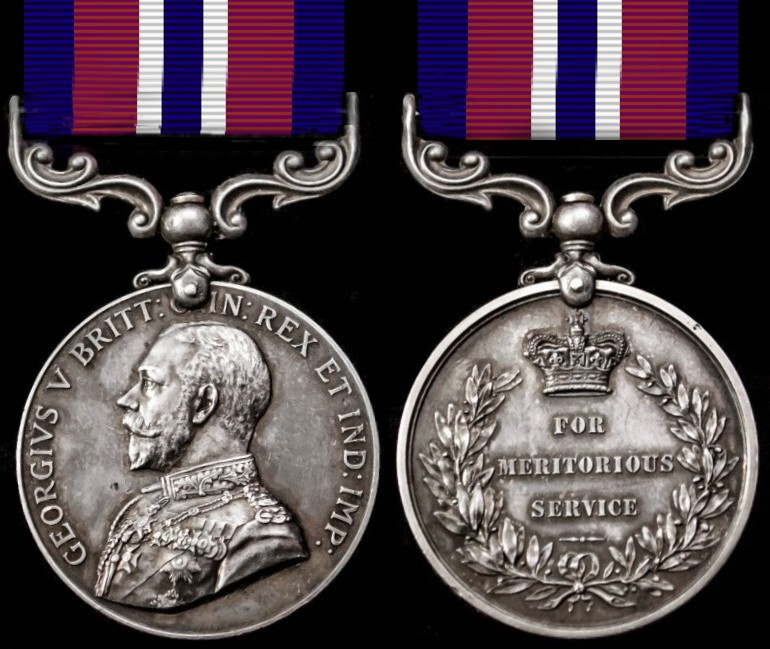
Meritorious Service Medal (South Africa)

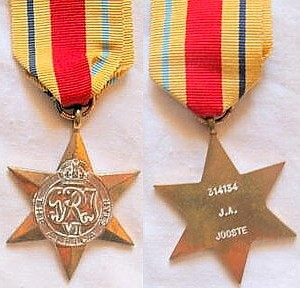
Africa Star

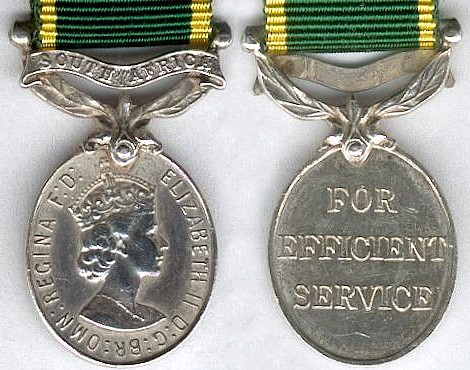
Efficiency Medal (South Africa)

Various medals and decorations of South Africa featuring the monarch's effigy, the Royal Crown or the Royal Cypher

The monarch, as the fount of honour, conferred awards and honours in South Africa in his or her name. Most of them were awarded on the advice of South African ministers.

Depictions of the Royal Crown, the Royal Cypher or the sovereign's likeness, appeared on various medals and decorations.

=== The Crown and the Armed Forces ===
The rank insignia of a Colonel (left), Lieutenant-Colonel (centre), and Major (right) in the Union of South Africa Army (1928–1953) featuring the Tudor Crown

The command-in-chief of the naval and military forces of the Union of South Africa was vested in the monarch, and was exercised by the governor-general as their representative.

References to the Royal Crown appeared on various regimental badges and rank insignia, which illustrated the monarchy as the locus of authority. In 1957, due to growing republican sentiment, the Crown was removed from the badges of the defence force and police' in the case of the former, it was replaced with the Union Lion from the crest of the country's coat of arms. In 1961, the "Royal" title was dropped from the names of some South African Army regiments, such as the Natal Carbineers.

Until 1952, South African Naval vessels bore the ship prefix HMSAS, i.e., His Majesty's South African Ship, and it was thereafter replaced by SAS, i.e., South African Ship.

=== Royal visits ===
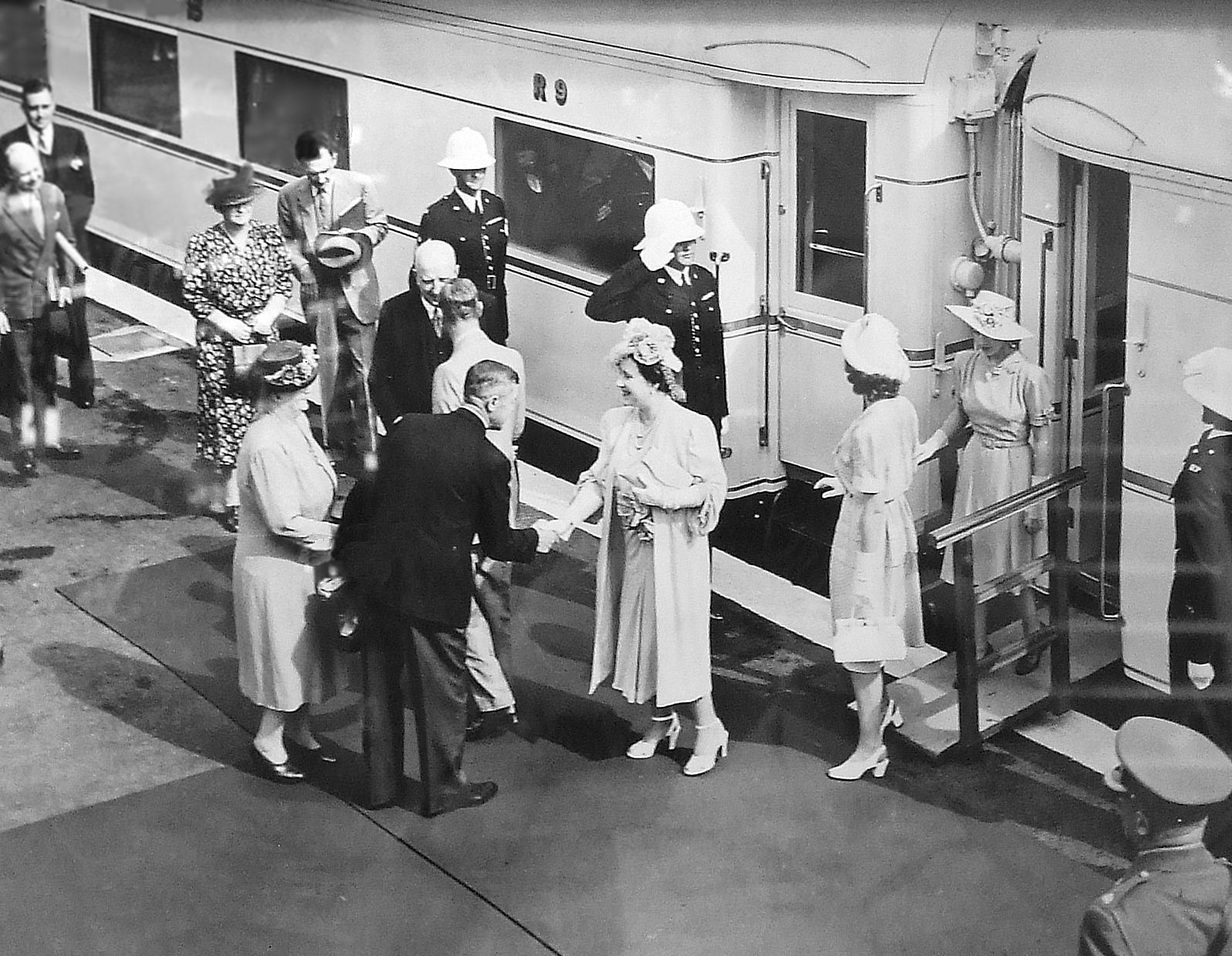
King George VI, Queen Elizabeth, and Princesses Elizabeth and Margaret, at Worcester Station, Cape Province, 1947

In 1860, Prince Alfred, Duke of Saxe-Coburg and Gotha, the second son and fourth child of Queen Victoria, became the first member of the royal family to visit South Africa. Later, in 1901, the then Duke and Duchess of Cornwall (later King George V and Queen Mary) visited South Africa during an extensive tour of the British Empire. Their eldest son, Edward, Prince of Wales (later King Edward VIII), toured the country in 1925.

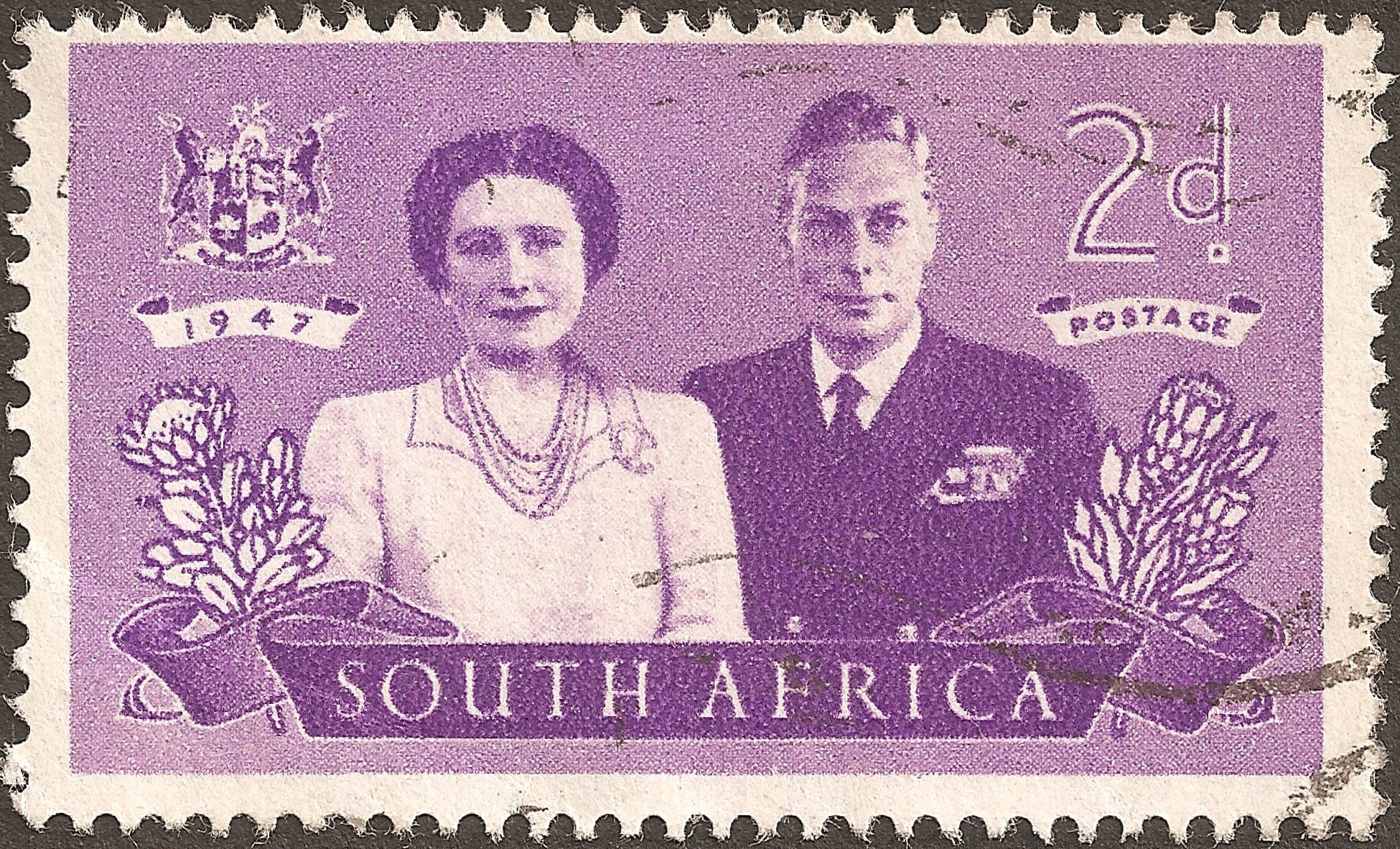
Stamp commemorating the 1947 royal visit

In 1947, King George VI, his wife Queen Elizabeth, and their daughters Princesses Elizabeth and Margaret, visited the country, during a three-month tour of Southern Africa. On 21 February 1947, King George VI, accompanied by Queen Elizabeth, opened a new session of the South African Parliament, the first state opening of a Dominion parliament by a reigning monarch. In his speech, the King spoke in both English and Afrikaans, and thanked South Africa for its support during the Second World War. It was in South Africa that Princess Elizabeth notably celebrated her 21st birthday and delivered the famous broadcast to the Empire on 21 April, in which she said, "I declare before you all that my whole life, whether it be long or short, shall be devoted to your service and the service of our great imperial family to which we all belong".

However, due to the South African Government's apartheid regime soon after the 1947 visit, royal visits to South Africa came to a halt, despite Elizabeth II being Queen of South Africa until 1961. Nearly half a century later, the Queen and her husband Prince Philip, Duke of Edinburgh undertook a state visit to South Africa in 1995, in support of reconciliation with the new South African government, and were hosted by President Nelson Mandela. The Queen returned to South Africa for the 16th Commonwealth Heads of Government Meeting in Durban in 1999.

== Republicanism ==
In 1940, D. F. Malan, along with J. B. M. Hertzog, founded the Herenigde Nasionale Party (or "Reunited National Party") which pledged to fight for "a free independent republic, separated from the British Crown and Empire", and "to remove, step by step, all anomalies which hamper the fullest expression of our national freedom". In 1942, details of a draft republican constitution were published in Afrikaans-language newspapers Die Burger and Die Transvaler, which provided for a State President, elected by white citizens known as Burgers only, who would be "only responsible to God... for his deeds in the fulfilment of his duties". On the matter of continued Commonwealth membership, the view of Afrikaner Broederbond was that "departure from the Commonwealth as soon as possible remains a cardinal aspect of our republican aim".

In 1948, the National Party, now led by D. F. Malan, came to power, although it did not campaign for a republic during the election, instead favouring remaining in the Commonwealth, thereby appealing to Afrikaners who otherwise might have voted for the United Party of Jan Smuts. Malan's successor as prime minister, J. G. Strijdom, also downplayed the republic issue, stating that no steps would be taken towards that end before 1958. Strijdom stated that the matter of whether South Africa would be a republic inside or outside the Commonwealth would be decided "with a view to circumstances then prevailing". Like his precessor, Strijdom declared the party's belief that a republic could only be proclaimed on the basis "of the broad will of the people".

=== Referendum and abolition ===
On becoming prime minister in 1958, Hendrik Verwoerd gave a speech to Parliament in which he declared: "We stand unequivocally and clearly for the establishment of the republic in the correct manner and at the appropriate time". In 1960, Verwoerd announced plans to hold a whites-only referendum on the establishment of a republic, with a bill to that effect being introduced in Parliament on 23 April of that year. The Referendum Act received assent on 3 June 1960. In hopes of winning the support of those opposed to a republic, not only English-speaking whites but Afrikaners still supporting the United Party, Verwoerd proposed that constitutional changes would be minimal, with the Queen simply being replaced as head of state by a State President, the office of which would be a ceremonial post rather than an executive one.

In Natal, the only province with an English-speaking majority of whites, there was strong anti-republican sentiment; in 1955, the small Federal Party issued a pamphlet The Case Against the Republic, while the Anti-Republican League organised public demonstrations. The League, founded by Arthur Selby, the Federal Party's chairman, launched the Natal Covenant in opposition to the plans for a republic, signed by 33,000 Natalians. On the day of the referendum, the Natal Witness, the province's daily English-language newspaper warned its readers that: "Not to vote against the Republic is to help those who would cut us loose from our moorings, and set us adrift in a treacherous and uncharted sea, at the very time that the winds of change are blowing up to hurricane force".

The National Party government subsequently organised the referendum on 5 October 1960. The vote, which was restricted to whites – the first such national election in the Union – was narrowly approved by 52.29% of the voters.

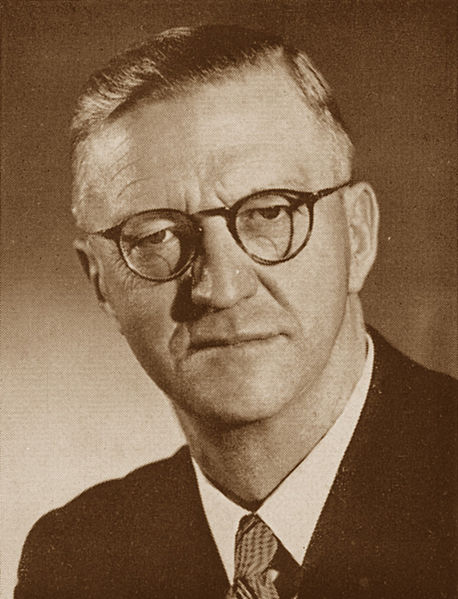
Charles R. Swart, last Governor-General and first State President of South Africa

The Republic of South Africa was declared on 31 May 1961, Queen Elizabeth II ceased to be head of state, and the last Governor General of the Union, Charles R. Swart, took office as the first State President.

=== Commonwealth membership ===
Originally every independent country in the Commonwealth was a Dominion – sharing a monarch with the United Kingdom and the other dominions. The 1949 London Declaration prior to India becoming a republic allowed countries with a different head of state to join or remain in the Commonwealth, but only by unanimous consent of the other members. The governments of Pakistan (in 1956) and, later, Ghana (in 1960) availed themselves of this principle, and the National Party had not ruled out South Africa's continued membership of the Commonwealth were there a vote in favour of a republic.

However, the Commonwealth by 1960 included new Asian and African members, whose rulers saw the apartheid state's membership as an affront to the organisation's new democratic principles. Julius Nyerere, then Chief Minister of Tanganyika, indicated that his country, which was due to gain independence in 1961, would not join the Commonwealth were apartheid South Africa to remain a member. A Commonwealth Prime Ministers' Conference was convened in March 1961, a year ahead of schedule, to address the issue. In response, Verwoerd stirred up a confrontation, causing many members to threaten to withdraw if South Africa's renewal of membership application was accepted. As a result, South Africa's membership application was withdrawn, meaning that upon its becoming a republic on 31 May 1961, the country's Commonwealth membership simply lapsed.

Following the end of apartheid, South Africa rejoined the Commonwealth in 1994, thirty-three years and one day the republic was established.

=== Contemporary views ===
Leading up to the wedding of Prince Harry and Meghan Markle in 2018, a survey by Ipsos found that 35% of South Africans believed that it would be worse for their country to have a constitutional monarchy instead of an elected head of state while 24% believed that having a monarchy would make the country better.

== List of South African monarchs ==
No.	Portrait	Regnal name (Birth–Death)	Reign over South Africa		Full name	Consort
No.	Portrait	Regnal name (Birth–Death)	Start	End	Full name	Consort
1		George V (1865–1936)	31 May 1910	20 January 1936	George Frederick Ernest Albert	Mary of Teck
1		George V (1865–1936)	Governors-general: Herbert Gladstone, 1st Viscount Gladstone, Sydney Buxton, 1st Earl Buxton, Prince Arthur of Connaught, Alexander Cambridge, 1st Earl of Athlone, George Villiers, 6th Earl of Clarendon; Prime ministers: Louis Botha, Jan Christian Smuts, J. B. M. Hertzog			
2		Edward VIII (1894–1972)	20 January 1936	10 December 1936	Edward Albert Christian George Andrew Patrick David	None
2		Edward VIII (1894–1972)	Governors-general: George Villiers, 6th Earl of Clarendon; Prime ministers: J. B. M. Hertzog			
3		George VI (1895–1952)	10 December 1936	6 February 1952	Albert Frederick Arthur George	Elizabeth Bowes-Lyon
3		George VI (1895–1952)	Governors-general: George Villiers, 6th Earl of Clarendon, Sir Patrick Duncan, Gideon Brand van Zyl, Ernest George Jansen; Prime ministers: J. B. M. Hertzog, Jan Christian Smuts, D. F. Malan			
4		Elizabeth II (1926–2022)	6 February 1952	31 May 1961	Elizabeth Alexandra Mary	Philip Mountbatten
4		Elizabeth II (1926–2022)	Governors-general: Ernest George Jansen, Charles Robberts Swart; Prime ministers: D. F. Malan, Johannes Gerhardus Strijdom, Hendrik Verwoerd			

== See also ==
- State President of South Africa
- President of South Africa
