= Ernest Frederick Watermeyer =

The Right Honourable Ernest Frederick Watermeyer PC, QC

9th Chief Justice of South Africa
- In office 1943–1950
- Preceded by: Nicolaas Jacobus de Wet
- Succeeded by: Albert van der Sandt Centlivres

Judge of the Appellate Division
- In office 1937–1942

Judge of the Cape Provincial Division of the Supreme Court of South Africa
- In office 1922–1937

Personal details
- Born: 12 October 1880 Graaff-Reinet, Cape Colony (now Eastern Cape, South Africa)
- Died: 18 January 1958 (aged 77) Hermanus, Cape Province, Union of South Africa
- Children: Jack Watermeyer
- Education: University of Cambridge
- Occupation: Lawyer and judge
- Profession: Barrister

Ernest Frederick Watermeyer (12 October 1880 – 18 January 1958) was the Chief Justice of South Africa from 1943 to 1950.

Watermeyer was born in Graaff-Reinet in 1880. He was educated at Stellenbosch Gymnasium, Bath College and Gonville and Caius College, Cambridge, where he read mathematics, then Law.

He was called to the bar in England by the Inner Temple in 1904, and admitted to the Cape bar in 1905. He became a King's Counsel in 1921. From 1922 to 1937, he was a judge of the Cape Provincial Division of the Supreme Court of South Africa. In 1937, he was promoted to the Supreme Court's Appellate Division.

In 1943, he was appointed Chief Justice of South Africa and was sworn of the Privy Council the same year, the last Chief Justice of South Africa to be made a Privy Counsellor. He served as Officer Administering the Government of the Union of South Africa in 1950, and retired the same year.
