= Governor-General of South Africa =

Representative of the monarch of South Africa

Governor-General of the Union of South Africa
- Goewerneur-generaal van die Unie van Suid-Afrika (Afrikaans); Goeverneur-generaal van de Unie van Zuid-Afrika (Dutch)
- Coat of arms of South Africa

- Flag of the governor-general
- Viceregal
- Style: His Excellency
- Status: Abolished
- Residence: Government House
- Appointer: Monarch of South Africa
- Constituting instrument: South Africa Act 1909
- Formation: 31 May 1910; 116 years ago
- First holder: Herbert Gladstone, 1st Viscount Gladstone
- Final holder: C. R. Swart
- Abolished: May 31, 1961; 65 years ago

The governor-general of the Union of South Africa (Afrikaans: Goewerneur-generaal van Unie van Suid-Afrika; Dutch: Goeverneur-generaal van de Unie van Zuid-Afrika (Note: Contemporary Dutch spelling used in South Africa from 1905 to 1925. Modern Dutch spelling: Gouverneur-generaal van de Unie van Zuid-Afrika)) was the highest state official in the Union of South Africa between 1910 and 1961. The Union of South Africa was founded as a self-governing Dominion of the British Empire in 1910 and the office of governor-general was established as the representative of the monarch of South Africa. Fifty-one years later, the country declared itself a republic and the office of governor-general was abolished.

Some of the first holders of the post were members of the British royal family including Prince Arthur of Connaught between 1920 and 1924, and Alexander Cambridge, 1st Earl of Athlone, who served between 1924 and 1931, before becoming the governor general of Canada. As in other Dominions, this would change, and from 1943 onward only South Africans (in fact, only Afrikaners) held the office.

The office was established by the South Africa Act 1909. Until the Balfour Declaration of 1926 the governor-general was the representative of the British government in South Africa and was appointed by the Colonial Office in London. After the declaration and the Statute of Westminster 1931 the governor-general was appointed by the monarch on the advice of the South African government. Although the governor-general was nominally the country's chief executive, in practice he was bound by convention to act on the advice of the prime minister and the cabinet of South Africa.

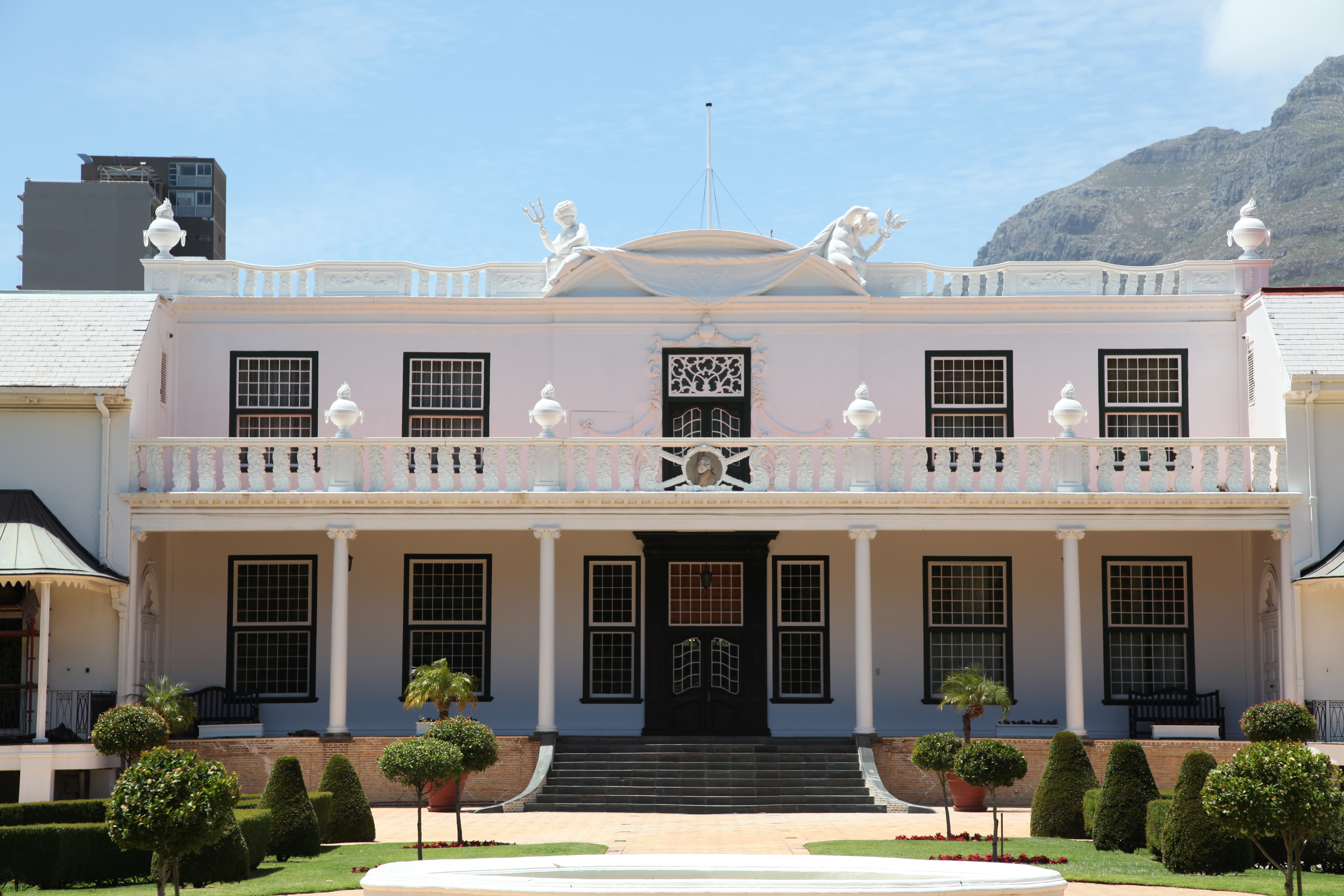
Die Tuynhuys, then-seat of the Governor-General in Cape Town

== List of governors-general ==
The following is a list of people who served as governor-general of South Africa from independence in 1910 to the establishment of a republic in 1961.

No.	Portrait	Name (Birth–Death)	Term of office			Monarch
No.	Portrait	Name (Birth–Death)	Took office	Left office	Time in office	Monarch
1		Herbert Gladstone, 1st Viscount Gladstone (1854–1930)	31 May 1910	8 September 1914	4 years, 100 days	George V (r. 1910–1936)
2		Sydney Buxton, 1st Earl Buxton (1853–1934)	8 September 1914	17 November 1920	6 years, 70 days	George V (r. 1910–1936)
3		Prince Arthur of Connaught (1883–1938)	17 November 1920	21 January 1924	3 years, 65 days	George V (r. 1910–1936)
4		Alexander Cambridge, 1st Earl of Athlone (1874–1957)	21 January 1924	26 January 1931	7 years, 5 days	George V (r. 1910–1936)
5		George Villiers, 6th Earl of Clarendon (1877–1955)	26 January 1931	5 April 1937	6 years, 69 days	George V (r. 1910–1936)
5		George Villiers, 6th Earl of Clarendon (1877–1955)	26 January 1931	5 April 1937	6 years, 69 days	Edward VIII (r. 1936)
5		George Villiers, 6th Earl of Clarendon (1877–1955)	26 January 1931	5 April 1937	6 years, 69 days	George VI (r. 1936–1952)
6		Sir Patrick Duncan (1870–1943)	5 April 1937	17 July 1943	6 years, 103 days	George VI (r. 1936–1952)
7		Gideon Brand van Zyl (1873–1956)	1 January 1946	1 January 1951	5 years	George VI (r. 1936–1952)
8		Ernest George Jansen (1881–1959)	1 January 1951	25 November 1959	8 years, 328 days	George VI (r. 1936–1952)
8		Ernest George Jansen (1881–1959)	1 January 1951	25 November 1959	8 years, 328 days	Elizabeth II (r. 1952–1961)
9		C. R. Swart (1894–1982)	11 December 1959	30 April 1961	1 year, 140 days	Elizabeth II (r. 1952–1961)

== Flag of the governor-general ==
1910–1931

1931–1953

1953–1961

== See also ==
- State President of South Africa
- President of South Africa
- Prime Minister of South Africa
