= 1928 in South Africa =

- Decades: 1900s; 1910s; 1920s; 1930s; 1940s
- See also: List of years in South Africa

The following lists events that happened during 1928 in South Africa.

== Incumbents ==
- Monarch: King George V.
- Governor-General and High Commissioner for Southern Africa: The Earl of Athlone.
- Prime Minister: James Barry Munnik Hertzog.
- Chief Justice: William Henry Solomon.

== Events ==
May

- 31 – South Africa adopts a new national flag, based upon the Van Riebeeck flag or Prinsevlag (originally the Dutch flag), to replace the Red Ensign.

June

- 9 – Ellis Park Stadium officially opens in Johannesburg.

Unknown date

- Eskom's first thermal power station, Salt River No. 1, begins operation.
- The Cecchetti Society of Southern Africa is formed with the aim of promoting the Methods of Enrico Cecchetti and introducing the Principles of the Cecchetti method to young ballet dancers in Southern Africa.

== Births ==
- 2 January – Kate Molale, anti-apartheid activist. (d. 1980)
- 16 January – Dirk Mudge, Namibian politician. (d. 2020)
- 19 March – Clive van Ryneveld, cricketer. (d. 2018)
- 27 May – Johan Heyns, theologian. (d. 1994)
- 10 July – Jack Nel, cricketer. (d. 2018)
- 27 August – Mangosuthu Buthelezi, leader of the Inkatha Freedom Party.
- 1 October – Laurence Harvey, Lithuanian-born South African actor. (d. 1973)
- 25 October – Edward Daniels, anti-apartheid activist (d. 2017)
- 14 November – George Bizos, human rights lawyer. (d. 2020)
- 6 December – Clarence Makwetu, anti-apartheid activist. (d. 2016)

== Deaths ==
- 5 June – Liege Hulett, politician and sugar magnate. (b. 1838)

== Railways ==
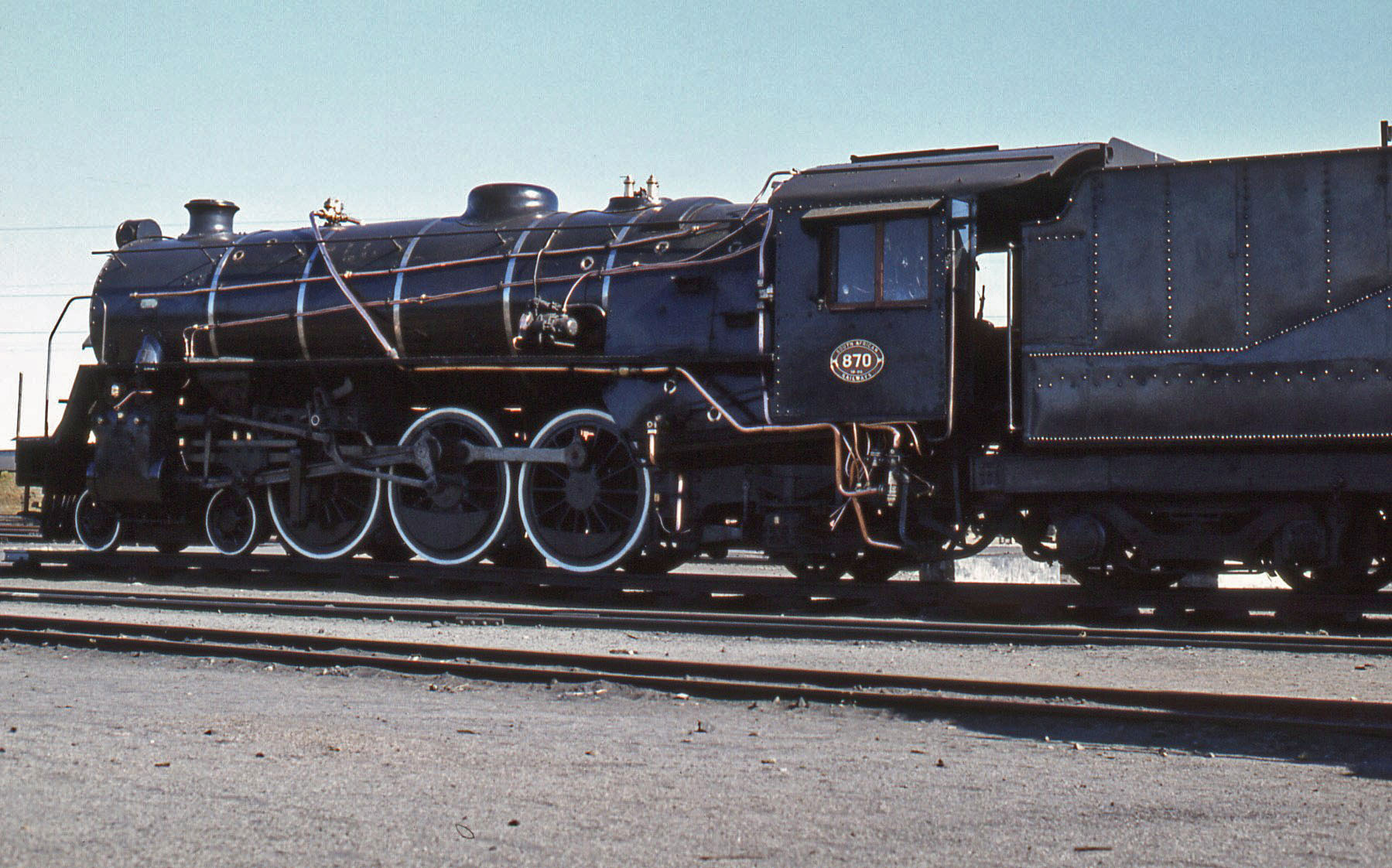
Narrow firebox Class 16DA

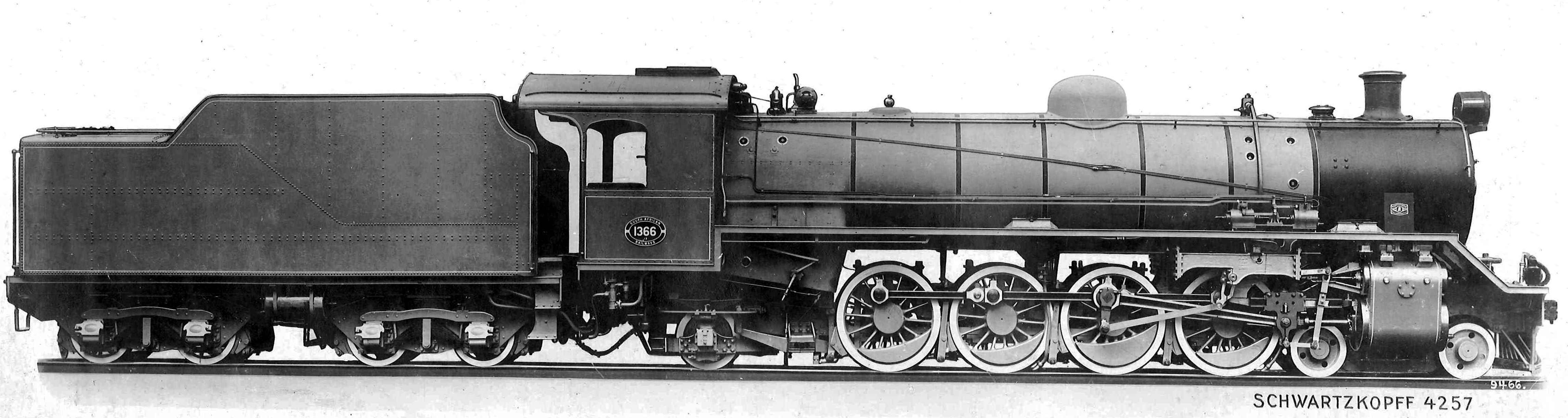
Class 19

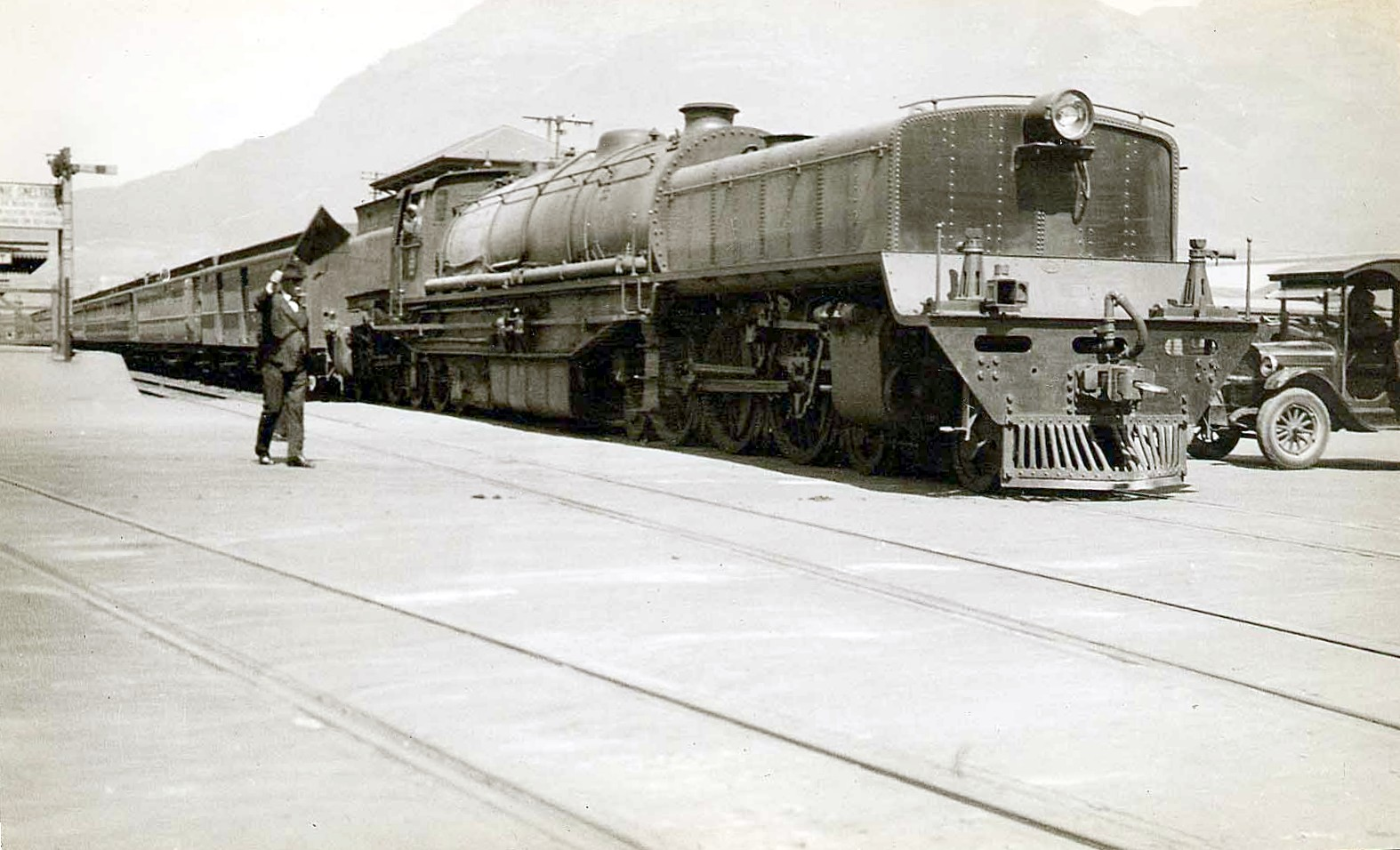
Class GH Union Garratt

=== Railway lines opened ===
- 31 January – Cape – Winter's Rush to Koopmansfontein, 27 miles 41 chains (44.3 kilometres).
- 24 February – Transvaal – Klerksdorp to Ottosdal, 47 miles 49 chains (76.6 kilometres).
- 14 April – Transvaal – Potchefstroom to Fochville, 31 miles 29 chains (50.5 kilometres).
- 1 May – Cape – George to Knysna, 42 miles 7 chains (67.7 kilometres).
- 11 June – Transvaal – Brits to Beestekraal, 26 miles 41 chains (42.7 kilometres).
- 2 July – Transvaal – Singlewood to Zebediela, 31 miles 25 chains (50.4 kilometres).
- 9 July – South West Africa – Ondekaremba to Seeis, 42 miles 2 chains (67.6 kilometres).
- 18 July – Free State – Bothaville to Wesselsbron, 42 miles 71 chains (69.0 kilometres).

=== Locomotives ===
Three new Cape gauge steam locomotive types enter service on the South African Railways (SAR):

- The first six Class 16DA 4-6-2 Pacific type passenger locomotives.
- Four Class 19 4-8-2 Mountain type branch line steam locomotives.
- Two Class GH 4-6-2+2-6-4 Double Pacific type passenger versions of the Class U Union Garratt articulated steam locomotive.
