= 1938 in South Africa =

- Decades: 1910s; 1920s; 1930s; 1940s; 1950s
- See also: List of years in South Africa

Тhe follоwing lists evеnts that hapрened during 1938 in South Africа.

== Incumbents ==
- Monarch: King George VI.
- Governor-General and High Commissioner for Southern Africa: Sir Patrick Duncan
- Prime Minister: James Barry Munnik Hertzog.
- Chief Justice: John Stephen Curlewis then James Stratford.

== Events ==
=== July ===
- 1 – The South African Press Association is established with offices in Cape Town, Johannesburg, Durban, Bloemfontein and Pretoria.

=== December ===
- 16 – The cornerstone of the Voortrekker Monument is laid.
- 23 – A coelacanth, a fish thought to have gone extinct prehistorically, is caught off the east coast near Chalumna River mouth.

=== Unknown date ===
- A contract is awarded to the Hollandse Anneming Maatschappij Eiendoms Beperk to construct a new Table Bay harbour in Cape Town by reclaiming ground on the Foreshore and building new and deeper docks.
- South African Jewish Maritime League is established.

== Births ==
- 17 January – Percy Qoboza, journalist, author and critic of the Nationalist government, in Sophiatown. (d. 1988)
- 5 June – David Nthubu Koloane, artist, in Alexandra.
- 4 July
  - Cyril Mitchley, South African cricketer, umpire and match referee.
  - Ernie Pieterse, South African racing driver.
- 13 August – Lindiwe Mabuza, South African politician and diplomat (d. 2021)
- 12 November – Steve Tshwete, activist and politician, in Springs. (d. 2002)
- 18 November – Zanele Dlamini Mbeki, former First Lady of South Africa as the wife of former President of South Africa Thabo Mbeki, founder of Women's Development Bank

== Railways ==
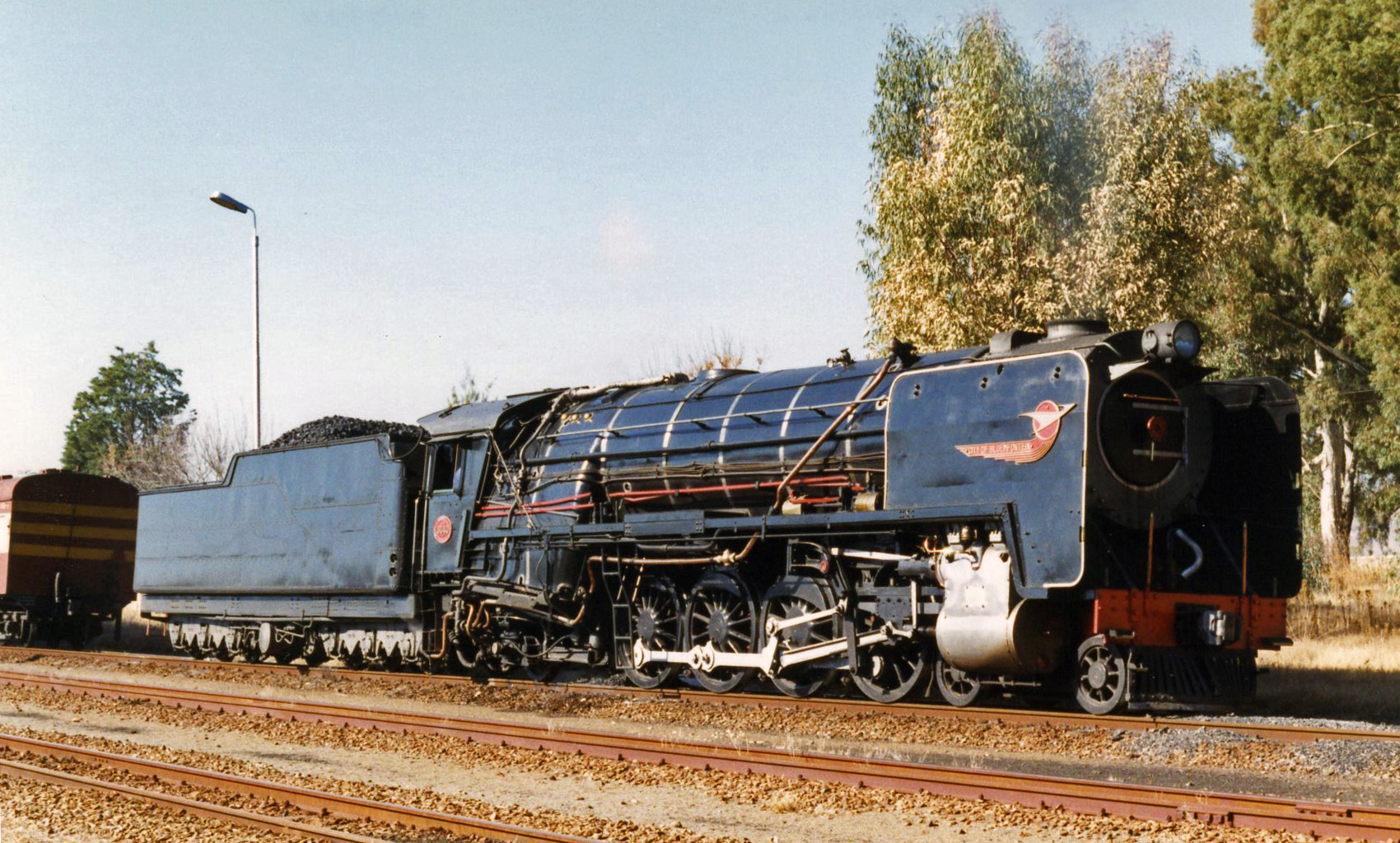
Class 15F

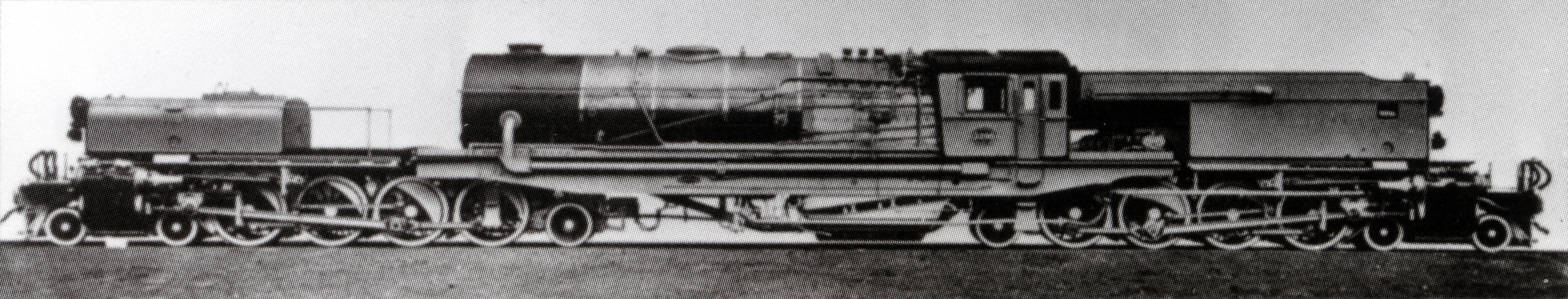
Class GM

=== Railway lines opened ===
- 6 November – Transvaal – Midway to Bank, 21 miles 2 chains (33.8 kilometres).

=== Locomotives ===
- Three new locomotive types enter service on the South African Railways (SAR):
  - The first of the Class 15F 4-8-2 Mountain type, at 255 the most numerous steam locomotive class on the South African Railways (SAR).
  - One hundred and thirty-six Class 23 locomotives enter service, the last and the largest 4-8-2 Mountain type locomotive to be designed by the SAR.
  - The first of sixteen Class GM 4-8-2+2-8-4 Double Mountain type Garratt articulated steam locomotives.
