= R v Bourke =

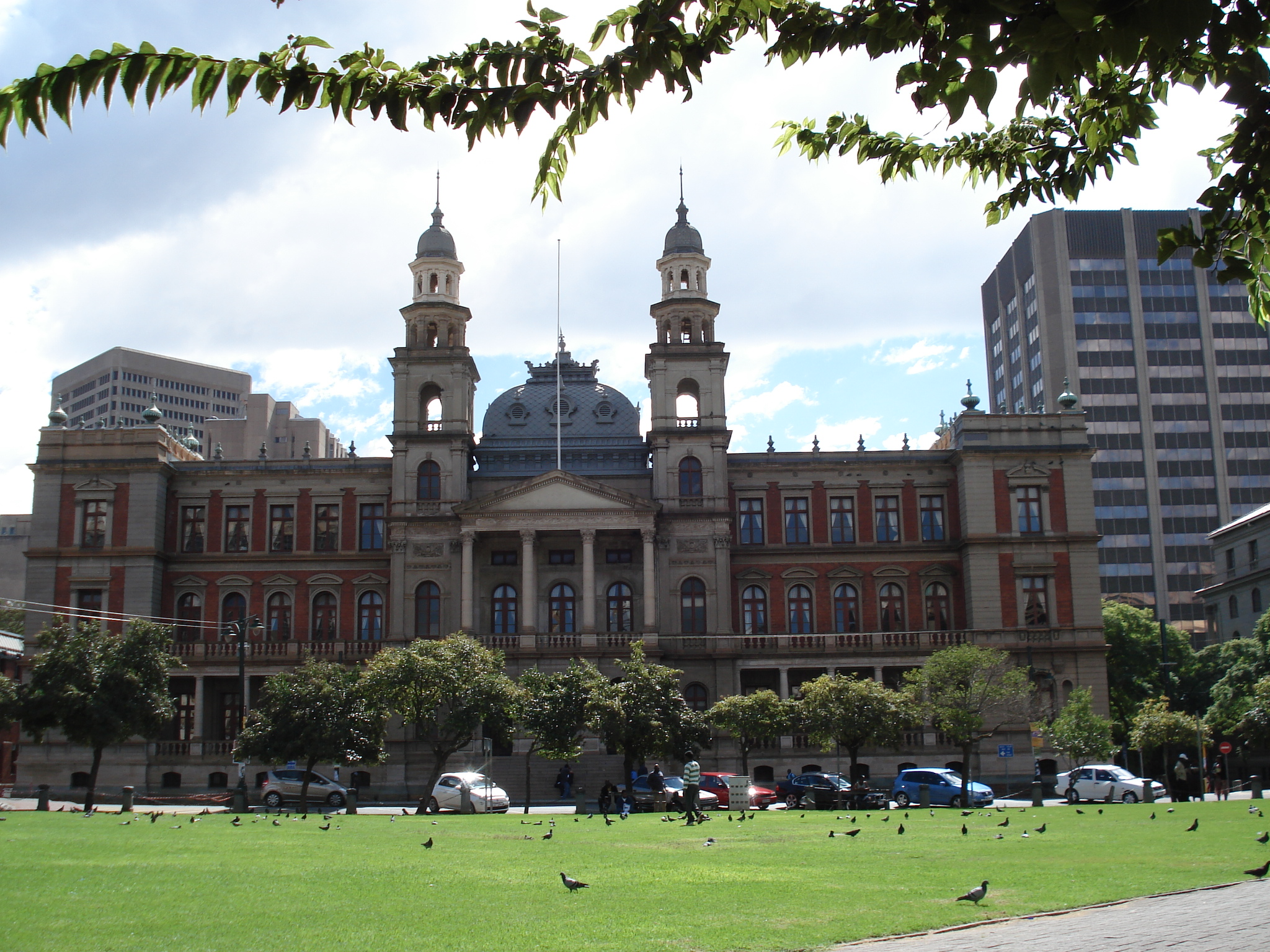
- Court: Transvaal Provincial Division
- Full case name: Rex v Bourke
- Decided: 11 May 1916
- Citation: 1916 TPD 303

Court membership
- Judges sitting: Wessels, Curlewis and Gregorowski JJ

Case opinions
- Decision by: Wessels J

Keywords
- Criminal law, Crime, Drunkenness, Excuse, Mitigation of sentence.

In Rex v Bourke, an important case in South African criminal law, the Transvaal Provincial Division (TPD) held that, under Roman-Dutch law, drunkenness is, as a general rule, no defence to a crime, although it may be a reason for mitigation of punishment. If the drunkenness is not voluntary—that is, if not caused by an act of the accused—and results in rendering the accused unconscious of what he was doing, he would not be responsible in law for an act done while in such a state. If constant drunkenness has induced a state of mental disease rendering the accused unconscious of his act at the time, he is not responsible and can be declared insane. Where a special intention is necessary to constitute a particular offence, drunkenness might reduce the crime from a more serious to a less serious one.

== Facts ==
The accused was charged before Mason J, and a jury at the Pretoria Criminal Sessions, with the crime of rape upon a European girl, of the age of ten years. It appeared from the evidence that the accused, at the time when he committed the crime, was under the influence of liquor.

The presiding judge, in directing the jury, asked them to answer the following questions: Did the accused commit

- the crime of rape;
- an attempt to commit rape; or
- indecent assault?

The judge directed the jury that, if they answered one of the questions in the affirmative, they were also to answer the following question: Was the accused unconscious of what he was doing at the time he did it?

The jury brought in the following verdict: "We find the accused guilty of indecent assault but are strongly of opinion that at the time he was not responsible for his actions." The presiding judge thereupon asked the jury whether they meant that the accused was unconscious of what he was doing on account of being drunk at the time; the answer was "yes."

The matter then went to the Transvaal Provincial Division. The question reserved for that court was whether, upon this verdict, the accused should be acquitted or convicted or declared a criminal lunatic, under Proclamation 36 of 1902.

== Argument ==
C. Barry, for the accused (at the request of the court), contended that the accused could not be declared a criminal lunatic, as in that case there must be a special finding of the jury as to his sanity or insanity. Drunkenness could mitigate the punishment. Barry then cited some authority on the question of whether drunkenness was a defence. A verdict of guilty but insane had been held to be equivalent to a verdict of not guilty. The same test which applied to lunacy, Barry argued, should logically, according to the English decisions, also apply to drunkenness.

CW de Villiers Attorney-General for the Crown, argued that the jury was not entitled to go into the question of the responsibility of the accused; they must determine only the facts. According to Roman Dutch Law, drunkenness is no defence to a crime; it can only mitigate the punishment. If a person commits a crime when he is dead drunk, in a state of smoor dronkenschap, then not the ordinary punishment, but an extraordinary punishment, can be imposed. The English rule was originally the same as South Africa's.

Barry replied.

== Judgment ==
The Transvaal Provincial Division held, on a point of law reserved, that the finding of the jury amounted to a verdict of guilty:

If we admit the proposition that absolute drunkenness must be regarded as equivalent to insanity, we are logically driven to the conclusion that absolute drunkenness excuses a person from crime. Is it true that absolute drunkenness is equivalent to insanity? I submit not. The essential difference between a drunken person and one who is insane is that the former as a rule voluntarily induces his condition, whilst the latter is, as a rule, the victim of disease. It is therefore not unreasonable to consider that the person who voluntarily becomes drunk is responsible for all such acts as flow from his having taken an excess of liquor. It may conflict with our doctrine that a man who does an act when unconscious does so without mens rea, but, according to our law, logic has here to give way to expediency, because, in practice, to allow drunkenness to be pleaded as an excuse would lead to a state of affairs repulsive to the community. It would follow that the regular drunkard would be more immune from punishment than the sober man. This was in the mind of Damhouder when he said that drunkenness does not excuse because otherwise men would plead their own wrongdoing in excuse for their crimes.

That was Wessels J. The other two judges agreed. "I think," wrote Gregorowski J, "when [a] man commits a crime under the influence of liquor, he has to take the consequences, even if there were every reason to think that if he were sober he would have restrained himself."

== See also ==
- Crime
- Law of South Africa
- South African criminal law
