= 1936 in South Africa =

- Decades: 1910s; 1920s; 1930s; 1940s; 1950s
- See also: List of years in South Africa

The following lists events that happened during 1936 in South Africa.

== Incumbents ==
- Monarch: King George V (until 20 January), King Edward VIII (20 January—11 December), King George VI (from 20 January).
- Governor-General and High Commissioner for Southern Africa: The Earl of Clarendon.
- Prime Minister: James Barry Munnik Hertzog.
- Chief Justice: John Wessels then John Stephen Curlewis.

== Events ==
February

- Trolleybuses (trackless trams) begin to operate in Cape Town.

April

- 7 – The Representation of Natives Act no 16 of 1936 is passed, the first of a series of laws to diminish the voting rights of non-Whites in the Cape Province.

July

- 2 – Die Vaderland, the first Afrikaans daily newspaper in Transvaal, begins publishing in Johannesburg.

September

- 15 – The Empire Exhibition, South Africa opens in Johannesburg.

Unknown date

- The Castle of Good Hope in Cape Town is proclaimed a National Monument.

== Births ==
- 22 January – Clive Derby-Lewis, politician, played a role in the assassination of South African Communist Party leader Chris Hani (d. 2016)
- 18 March – F. W. de Klerk, 10th State President of South Africa (1989–1994).
- 11 April – Mac Maharaj, Apartheid Activist
- 20 June – Dick Lord, South African Air Force and Fleet Air Arm fighter pilot. (d. 2011)
- 21 June – Lionel Davis, artist, in Cape Town.
- 26 September – Winnie Madikizela-Mandela, Apartheid Activist South Africa (d. 2018)
- 22 October – Neville Alexander in Cradock. (d. 2012)
- 14 November – Arthur Howard, cricketer

== Deaths ==
- 2 July – Lionel Phillips, mining magnate, chairman of the South African Chamber of Mines and politician, at Vergelegen, Somerset West. (b. 1855)

== Railways ==
=== Railway lines opened ===
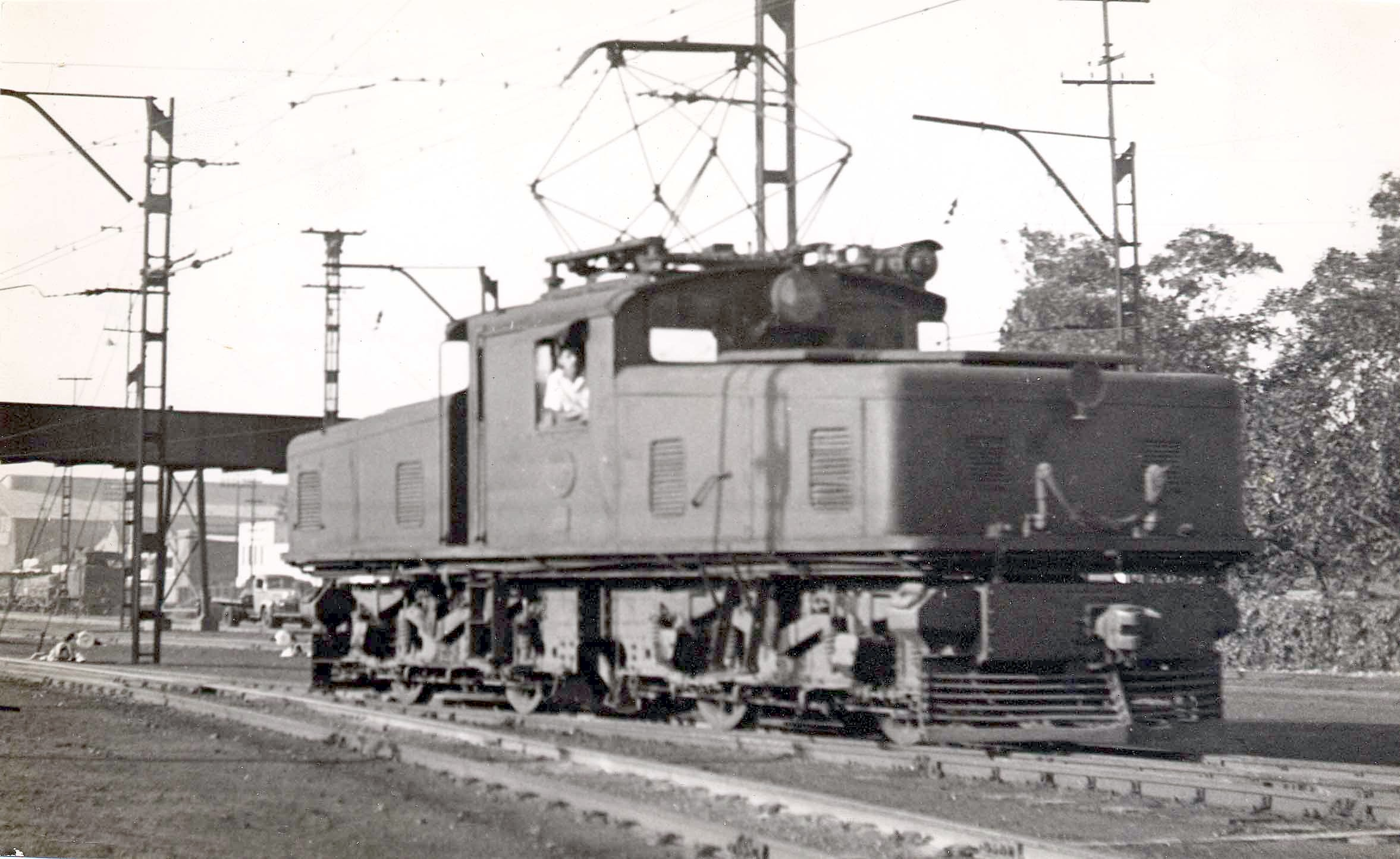
Class ES

- 1 May – Natal – Point to Congella, 1 mile 52 chains (2.7 kilometres).
- 15 June – Cape – Palingpan to Manganore, 3 miles 48 chains (5.8 kilometres).
- 30 June – Cape – Postmasburg to Lohatla, 23 miles 20 chains (37.4 kilometres).

=== Locomotives ===
- The South African Railways builds the first two of 24 Class ES centre-cab electric shunting locomotives in its Pietermaritzburg shops, based on the Class 1E mainline electric locomotive.
