= 1929 in South Africa =

- Decades: 1900s; 1910s; 1920s; 1930s; 1940s
- See also: List of years in South Africa

The following lists events that happened during 1929 in South Africa.

== Incumbents ==
- Monarch: King George V.
- Governor-General and High Commissioner for Southern Africa: The Earl of Athlone.
- Prime Minister: James Barry Munnik Hertzog.
- Chief Justice: William Henry Solomon then Jacob de Villiers.

== Events ==
June

- 14 – The National Party under J.B.M. Hertzog wins the South African general election with an outright majority for a second consecutive term.

July

- 24 – Union Airways Pty. Ltd. is founded, to be nationalised as South African Airways on 1 February 1934.

August

- 26 – Union Airways commences operations.

== Births ==
- 23 May – Joe Modise, anti-apartheid activist. (d. 2001)
- 2 July – Daphne Hasenjäger, South African athlete.
- 21 August – Ahmed Kathrada, anti-apartheid activist. (d. 2017)
- 19 October – Lewis Wolpert, South African-born British biologist (d. 2021)
- 25 December – Arthur Goldreich, South African-Israeli abstract painter and anti-apartheid activist. (d. 2011)

== Deaths ==
- 20 March – Ferdinand Foch, the First World War commander-in-chief of the Allied forces in France after whom Fochville was named. (b. 1851)
- 30 October – Sir Joseph Robinson, 1st Baronet, mining magnate and Randlord

== Railways ==
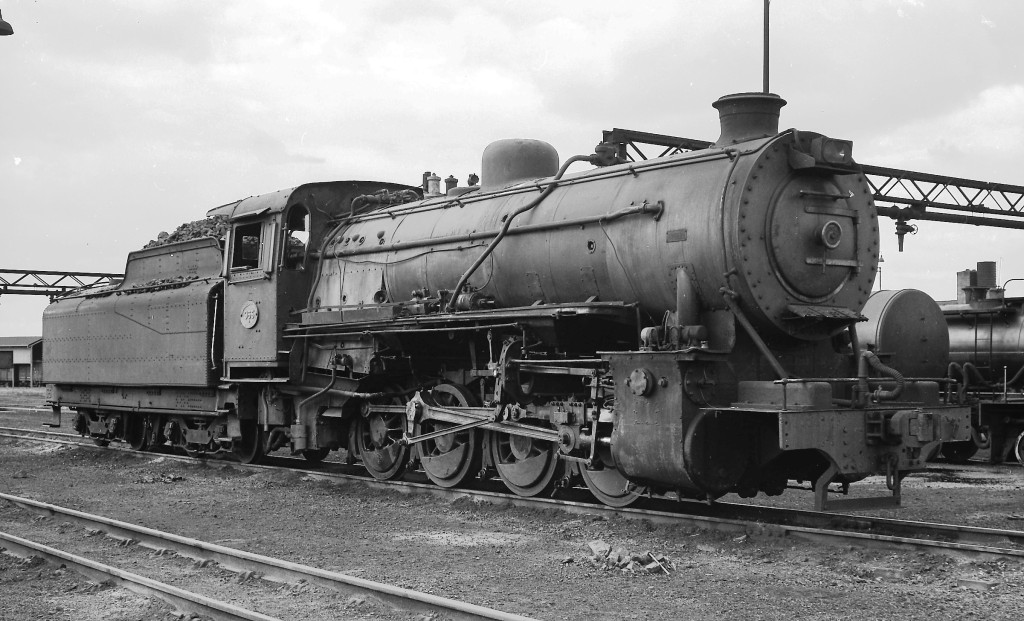
Class S

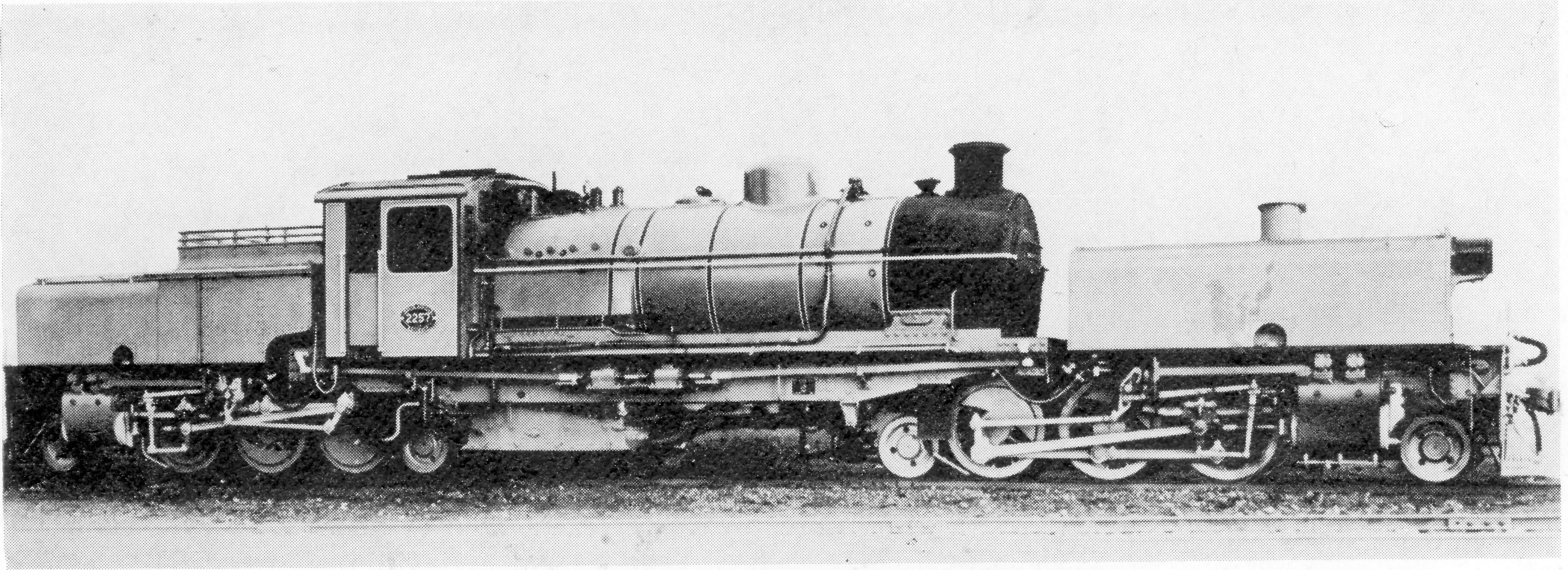
Class GDA

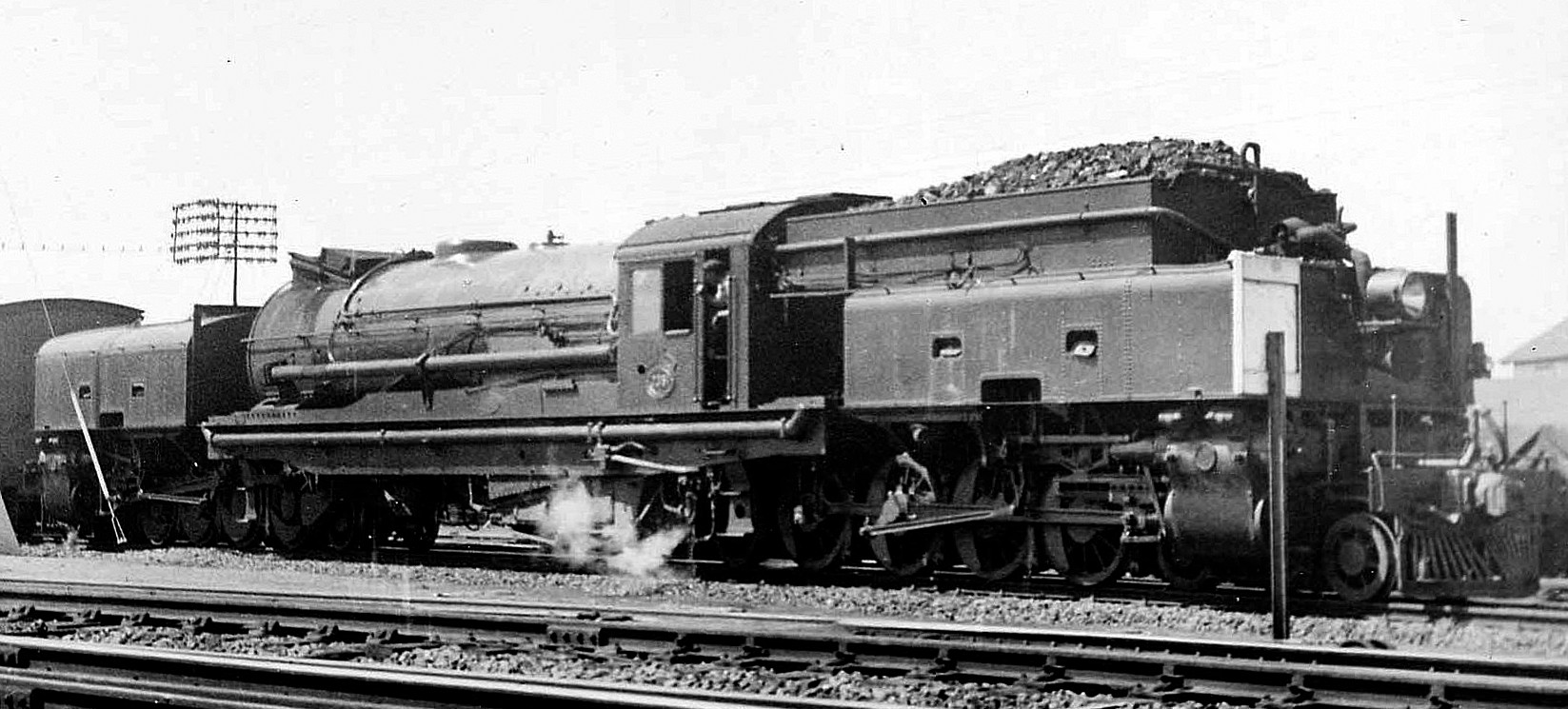
Class GL

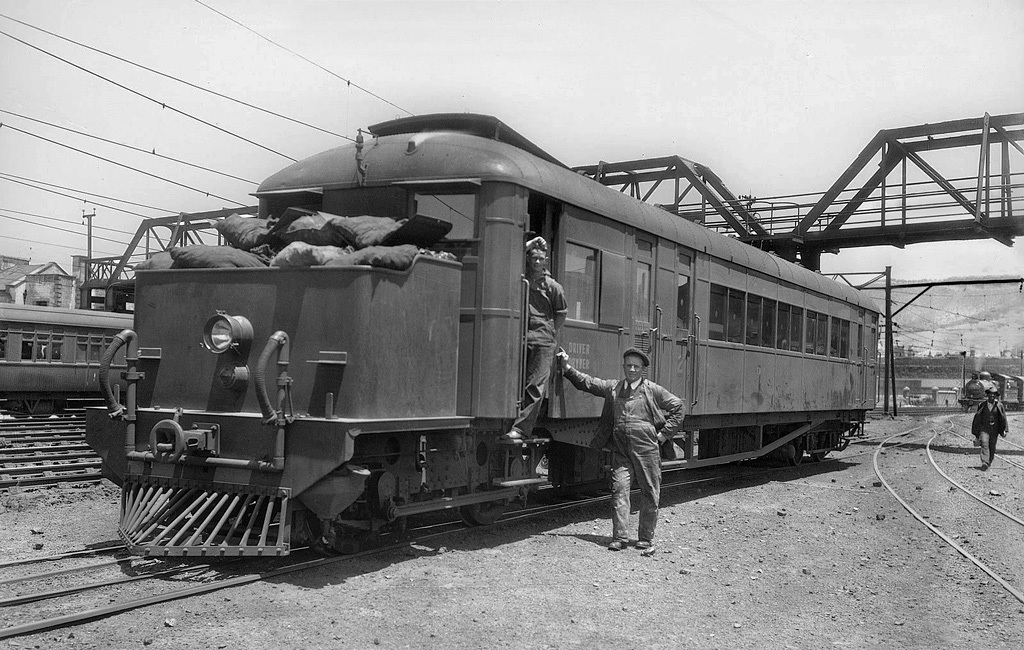
Clayton Railmotor

=== Railway lines opened ===
- 3 April – Cape – Hermon to Porterville, 36 miles 10 chains (58.1 kilometres).
- 10 April – Cape – Ceres to Prince Alfred Hamlet, 6 miles 25 chains (10.2 kilometres).
- 16 April – Free State – Wesselsbron to Bultfontein, 35 miles 45 chains (57.2 kilometres).
- 31 July – Free State – Arlington to Lindley, 12 miles 26 chains (19.8 kilometres).
- 12 August – Transvaal – Boshoek to Middelwit, 58 miles 35 chains (94.0 kilometres).
- 31 August – Transvaal – Messina to Beitbridge, 10 miles 30 chains (16.7 kilometres).
- 14 November – Transvaal – Derwent to Stoffberg, 37 miles 73 chains (61.0 kilometres).
- 1 December – South West Africa – Seeis to Witvlei, 66 miles 41 chains (107.0 kilometres).

=== Locomotives ===
Six new steam locomotive types, four Cape gauge and one narrow gauge, enter service on the South African Railways (SAR):

- Fourteen purpose-built Class S 0-8-0 shunting steam locomotives.
- Thirty-six Class 19A 4-8-2 Mountain type steam locomotives.
- Five Class GDA 2-6-2+2-6-2 Double Prairie type Garratt articulated branchline locomotives.
- The first two of eight Class GL 4-8-2+2-8-4 Double Mountain type Garratt locomotives on the Durban-Cato Ridge section in Natal.
- A single self-contained steam Clayton Railmotor for low-volume passenger service.
- A single narrow gauge 0-6-0 tank locomotive, built to the same design as the German South West African Class Hc of 1907, on the Otavi Railway in South West Africa.
