= 1934 in South Africa =

- Decades: 1910s; 1920s; 1930s; 1940s; 1950s
- See also: List of years in South Africa

The following lists events that happened during 1934 in South Africa.

== Incumbents ==
- Monarch: King George V
- Governor-General: The Earl of Clarendon
- Prime Minister: James Barry Munnik Hertzog
- Chief Justice: John Wessels

== Events ==
February

- 1 – South African Airways is inaugurated and takes over the passenger and goods air services from Union Airways.

June

- The National Party and South African Party unite to form the United Party.

July

- 9 – The Hitler Youth movement is prohibited in South West Africa.

December

- 3 – The Status of the Union Act and the Royal Executive Functions and Seals Act come into operation: i.a. they make Parliament the sovereign legislative power in the Union; adopt parts of the Statute of Westminster; vest the executive government in the king, acting on the advice of the South African ministers only; and institute the Royal Great Seal of the Union and the Royal Signet of the Union.

Unknown date

- The Slums Act is passed, giving municipalities and the government the authority to acquire slum properties.

== Births ==
- 5 January – Phil Ramone, recording engineer, record producer, violinist and composer, co-founder of A & R Recording, Inc. (d. 2013)
- 14 January – Laurie Ackermann, Constitutional Court of South Africa judge
- 8 May – Sibusiso Bengu, politician
- 16 May – Ronnie Govender, playwright and director (d, 2021)
- 26 May – Dullah Omar, lawyer and politician. (d. 2004)
- 12 June –
  - Abdulhay Jassat, South African political activist
  - Moosa Moolla, South African activist and diplomat (d. 2023)
- 28 June – Peter Beighton, English-born geneticist (d. 2017)
- 5 August – Zakes Mokae, actor (d. 2009)
- 8 August – Sam Nzima, photographer who took what became the well known image of Hector Pieterson for the Soweto uprising (d. 2018)
- 3 October – Harold Henning, golfer. (d. 2004)
- 8 October – Kader Asmal, activist, politician and professor of human rights (d. 2011)
- 9 October – Abdullah Ibrahim, pianist and composer (d. 2026)
- 20 October – Mary Peach, film and television actress (d. 2025)
- 8 November – Edward Bhengu, activist and founding member of the Pan Africanist Congress of Azania (d. 2010)
- 9 November – Ronald Harwood, playwright (d. 2020)

== Deaths ==
- 27 March – Francis William Reitz, president of the Orange Free State. (b. 1844)
- 28 July – Louis Tancred, cricketer. (b. 1876)

== Railways ==
=== Railway lines opened ===
- 26 February – Transvaal – Northam to Thabazimbi, 28 miles 72 chains (46.5 kilometres).
- 29 July – Transvaal – Germiston to Elsburg, 2 miles 49 chains (4.2 kilometres).
- 21 September – Transvaal – Tuinplaas to Marble Hall, 36 miles 36 chains (58.7 kilometres).
- 15 October – Cape – Kleinstraat to Matroosberg, 8 miles 48 chains (13.8 kilometres).
