= Wells v SA Alumenite =

South African legal case

Wells v SA Alumenite Co. is an important case in South African contract law, heard in the Appellate Division in Bloemfontein, on 6 October 1926, with judgment delivered on 11 October. Innes CJ, De Villiers JA, Kotzé JA, Wessels JA and Stratford AJA were the judges.

== Facts ==
Wells, defendant in a magistrate's court, when sued for the purchase price of a lighting plant purchased by him from the plaintiff SA Alumenite, raised the defence that he had been induced to enter into the contract by certain misrepresentations made by the salesman who, acting on behalf of SA Alumenite, had negotiated the sale. Wells claimed in reconvention for an order rescinding the contract on the ground of the alleged misrepresentations.

It appeared that an order form, signed by Wells, contained the following condition:

I hereby acknowledge that I have signed this order irrespective of any representoons made to me by any of your representatives and same is not subject to cancellation by me.

The magistrate dismissed SA Alumenite's exception to the claim in reconvention. The matter was then taken by consent, in terms of Proclamation 145 of 1923, to the Eastern Districts Local Division, which upheld the exception to the plea and also to the counterclaim. The case went before the Appellate Division on special leave.

== Judgment ==
The Appellate Division held that, in the absence of any allegation that the representations made were fraudulent, Wells was bound by the condition in the order. His plea, therefore, disclosed no defence. The decision of the Eastern Districts Local Division, in South African Alumenite Company v Wells, was thus confirmed.

== See also ==
- South African contract law
