= 1932 in South Africa =

- Decades: 1910s; 1920s; 1930s; 1940s; 1950s
- See also: List of years in South Africa

The following lists events that happened during 1932 in South Africa.

== Incumbents ==
- Monarch: King George V.
- Governor-General and High Commissioner for Southern Africa: The Earl of Clarendon.
- Prime Minister: James Barry Munnik Hertzog.
- Chief Justice: Jacob de Villiers then John Wessels.

== Events ==
September

- 21 – A new embellished version of the coat of arms of South Africa is approved.

== Births ==
- 18 January – Peter Magubane, photographer. (b. 2024).
- 4 March – Miriam Makeba, South African singer. (d. 2008)
- 13 April – Barney Simon, writer, playwright and director (d. 1995)
- 25 April – Frene Ginwala, Speaker of the National Assembly of South Africa
- 27 April – Pik Botha, politician. (d. 2018)
- 12 May – Joel Joffe, Baron Joffe, lawyer. (d. 2017)
- 11 June – Athol Fugard, author and dramatist. (d. 2025)
- 12 June
  - Patrick Mynhardt, actor. (d. 2007)
  - Mimi Coertse, opera soprano. (d. 2026)
- 18 June – Louis Luyt, business tycoon and politician, and one-time rugby administrator (d. 2013)
- 26 June – Harry Bromfield, cricketer.
- 12 July – Sheena Duncan, member of the Anglican Church's Challenge Group and Black Sash movement. (d. 2010)
- 29 November – Johann Kriegler, Constitutional Court of South Africa.

== Deaths ==
- 19 June – Sol Plaatje, intellectual, journalist, linguist, politician, translator and writer. (b. 1876)
- 15 July – Cornelis Jacobus Langenhoven, playwright, poet, journalist and politician. (b. 1873)
- 30 December – Daisy de Melker is hanged for the murder of her 20-year-old son Rhodes Cowle. (b. 1886)

== Sports ==
- 1932 Currie Cup
