= R v Schoombie =

South African legal case

R v Schoombie is an important case in South African law, heard in the Appellate Division on 21 March 1945, with judgment handed down on 15 May, and Watermeyer CJ, Tindall JA, Greenberg JA and Davis AJA presiding.

== Facts ==
On an indictment for attempted arson, it was proved

- that the accused had gone by car to a shop in the early hours of the morning, taking with him petrol and a tin containing inflammable material;
- that he had placed the tin against the door of the shop and poured petrol into and around it in such a way that the petrol ran under the door into the shop; and
- that he was at this stage interrupted by the arrival of a "native" constable.

The accused was duly convicted.

== Judgment ==
The Appellate Division, upon a question of law reserved, held

- that, since petrol which has been poured out spreads and evaporates quickly, it could legitimately be inferred that the accused was on the point of igniting it at the moment he was interrupted;
- that consequently the placing of the tin and the pouring of the petrol were acts which could properly be regarded as forming part of one continuous operation of setting the building on fire, and not as mere acts of preparation for a subsequent setting on fire; and
- that, therefore, there was evidence upon which the trial judge was entitled to convict.

The principles to be applied in deciding whether the actions of an accused person are mere acts of preparation or amount to an attempt to commit a crime were discussed, and the case of R v Nlhovo applied.

== See also ==
- Attempt
- Crime in South Africa
- Law of South Africa
- South African criminal law
