= JML =

JML may refer to:

- Java Modeling Language, a specification language for Java programs
- Journal of Mathematical Logic
- Journal of Memory and Language, abbreviated JML
- JML (company), a UK consumer brand
  - JML Direct TV, a series of British television shopping channels owned by John Mills Limited
- South African Jewish Maritime League

== See also ==
- JMI (disambiguation)
