= Strachan v Prinsloo =

South African legal case

Strachan v Prinsloo is an important case in South African contract law. It was heard in the Transvaal Provincial Division by Tindall J and Greenberg J.

== Facts ==
An agreement between Strachan and Prinsloo imposed on the former the duty of managing the latter's farm so as to relieve him of all duties of supervision. In spite of warnings, Strachan persistently and continuously failed to attend early in the morning and late in the evening, which was when important duties of supervising had to be done, with the result that those duties had to be performed by Prinsloo. Finally, on three successive days, Strachan did not appear on the farm at all, whereupon Prinsloo cancelled the agreement.

== Judgment ==
The court held

- that, in order to determine whether or not the cancellation was justified, the test to be applied was whether or not Strachan had

failed to perform a vital term, express or implied, of the agreement;

- that an important factor in deciding whether such a term was vital was the question of whether or not Prinsloo would have entered into the agreement in the absence of such term;
- that Strachan had in fact failed to perform a vital term; and
- that Prinsloo was therefore justified in terminating the agreement.

A serious violation of duty by one party, in other words, justifies the other in terminating the contract.
