= R v Viljoen =

South African legal case

R v Viljoen is an important case in South African law. It was heard in the Appellate Division on 23 April 1941, with judgment handed down on 6 May. De Wet CJ, Watermeyer JA, Tindall JA, Centlivres JA, and Feetham JA presided.

== Facts ==
A statement had been made by the accused to a peace officer without compliance with the formalities prescribed by section 273(1) of the Criminal Procedure and Evidence Act.

== Judgment ==
That statement, the court found, although it was capable of implying an admission of guilt, was also capable of a rational explanation, which did not include any such admission. The court held, therefore, that the statement was not a confession within the meaning of the section.

== See also ==
- Confession (law)
- Crime in South Africa
- Evidence (law)
- Law of South Africa
- South African criminal law
- South African criminal procedure
