= 1930 in South Africa =

- Decades: 1910s; 1920s; 1930s; 1940s; 1950s
- See also: List of years in South Africa

The following lists events that happened during 1930 in South Africa.

== Incumbents ==
- Monarch: King George V.
- Governor-General and High Commissioner for Southern Africa:
  - The Earl of Athlone (until 21 December).
  - Jacob de Villiers (acting from 21 December).
- Prime Minister: James Barry Munnik Hertzog.
- Chief Justice: Jacob de Villiers.

== Events ==
May

- 19 – White women are enfranchised.

October

- 10 – The Private Act of the University of Pretoria is passed, changing the name of the Transvaal University College to the University of Pretoria.

== Births ==
- 30 January – Magnus Malan, soldier and Minister of Defence in the 1980s, in Pretoria. (d. 2011)
- 23 February – Fanie du Plessis, South African athlete, in Lichtenburg. (d. 2001)
- 6 May – May Abrahamse, soprano (d. 2025)
- 12 May – Mazisi Kunene, poet, anti-apartheid activist. (d. 2006)
- 24 June – Donald Gordon, South African businessman and philanthropist (d. 2019)
- 7 August – Felicia Kentridge, lawyer (d. 2015)
- 5 November – Laloo Chiba, anti-apartheid activist. (d. 2020)
- 12 November – Molly Blackburn, anti-apartheid movement activist (d. 1985)
- 29 November – David Goldblatt, photographer, in Randfontein. (d. 2018)

== Deaths ==
- 28 February – Sir Perceval Maitland Laurence, English classical scholar, South African judge and benefactor of the University of Cambridge. (b. 1854)
- 10 September 10 – Aubrey Faulkner, cricketer. (b. 1881)

== Railways ==
=== Railway lines opened ===
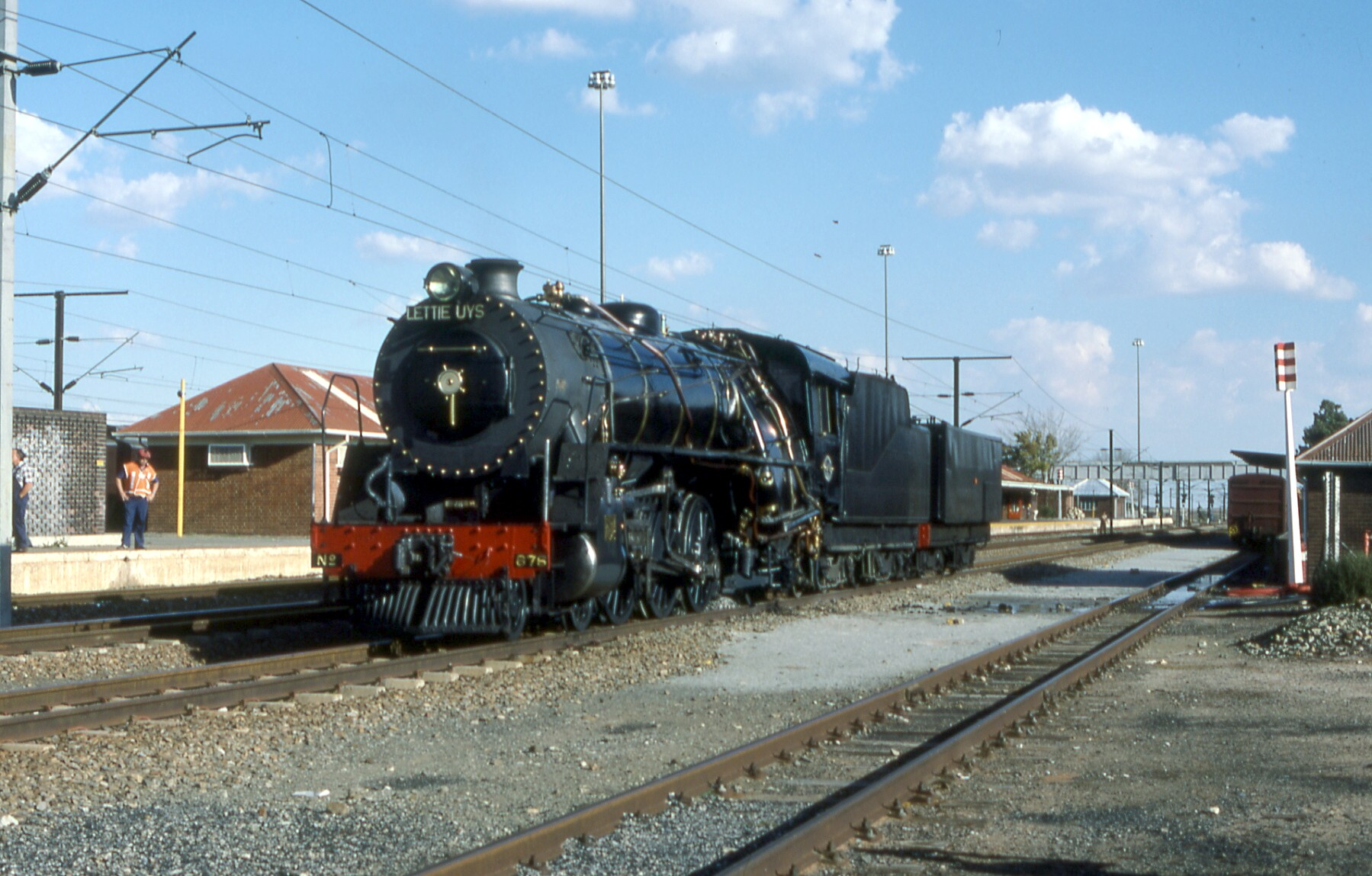
Wide-firebox Class 16DA

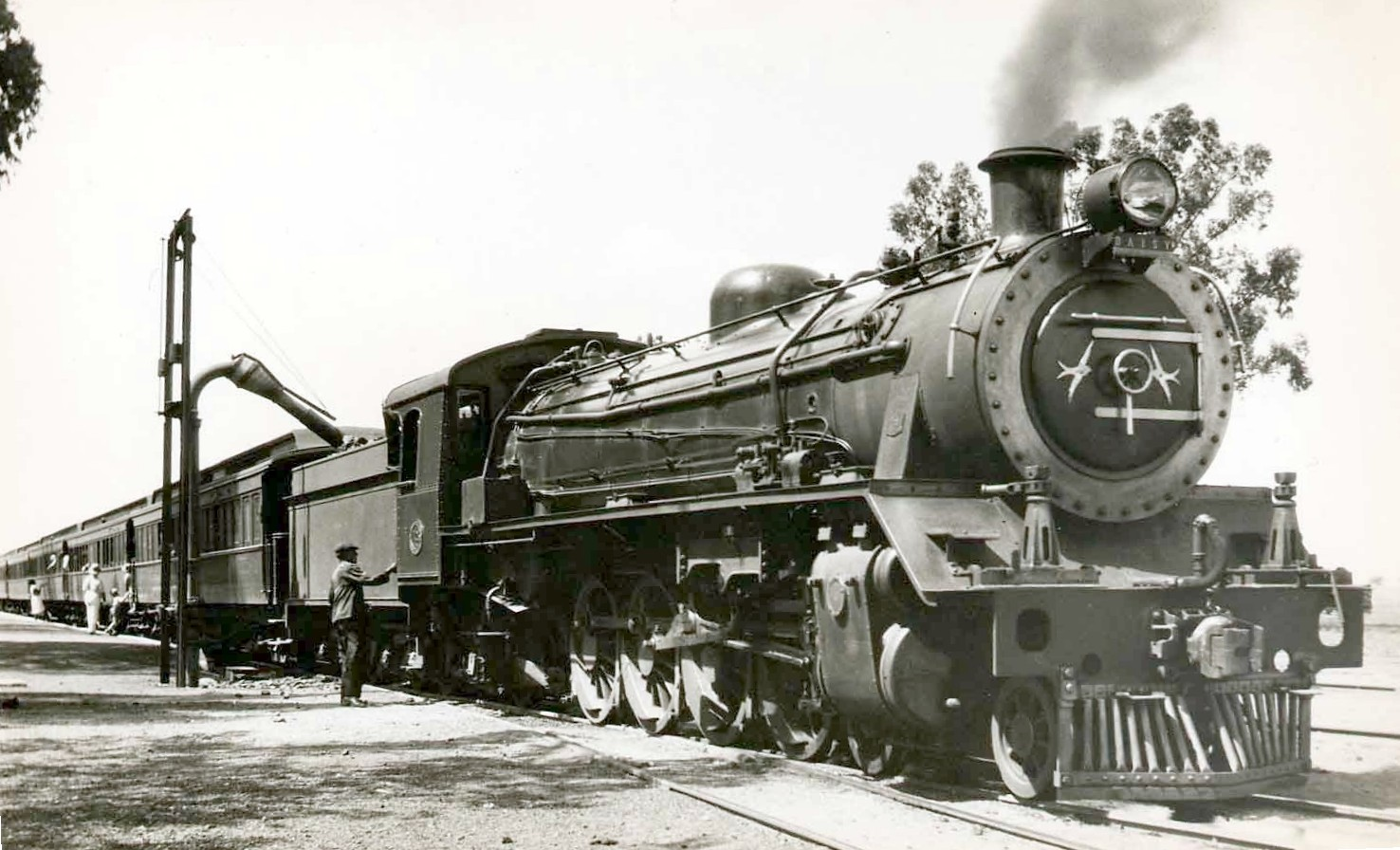
Class 19B

- 14 April – Cape – Fort Knokke to Woltemade no. 1, 4 miles 5 chains (6.5 kilometres).
- 24 April – Free State – Parys to Vredefort, 10 miles 75 chains (17.6 kilometres).
- 14 May – Free State – Petrus Steyn to Lindley, 27 miles 67 chains (44.8 kilometres).
- 19 September – Natal – Empangeni to Nkwalini, 39 miles 67 chains (64.1 kilometres).
- 1 November – Cape – Koopmansfontein to Postmasburg, 65 miles 74 chains (106.1 kilometres).
- 6 November – South West Africa – Witvlei to Gobabis, 31 miles 44 chains (50.8 kilometres).
- 10 December – Cape – New England to Barkly East, 18 miles 6 chains (29.1 kilometres).

=== Locomotives ===
- One Class 8X 2-8-0 locomotive is rebuilt to a 4-8-0 configuration and reclassified to the only member of Class 8R.
- Six redesigned wide-firebox Class 16DA 4-6-2 Pacific locomotives enter passenger train service.
- Fourteen Class 19B 4-8-2 Mountain type locomotives enter service.
