= 1937 in South Africa =

- Decades: 1910s; 1920s; 1930s; 1940s; 1950s
- See also: List of years in South Africa

The following lists events that happened during 1937 in South Africa.

== Incumbents ==
- Monarch: King George VI.
- Governor-General:
  - The Earl of Clarendon (until 19 March),
  - John Stephen Curlewis (acting, 19 March to 5 April)
  - Sir Patrick Duncan (starting 5 April).
- Prime Minister: James Barry Munnik Hertzog.
- Chief Justice: John Stephen Curlewis.

== Events ==
January

- 15 – The Empire Exhibition, South Africa closes in Johannesburg.

February

- 1 – The Aliens Act No. 1 is promulgated, restricting and regulating the entry of certain aliens into the Union of South Africa and regulating the right of any person to assume a surname.

April

- 5 – Sir Patrick Duncan is appointed the 6th Governor-General of the Union of South Africa, the first South African to hold the position.

=== October ===
- 1 – The Afrikaner nationalist newspaper Die Transvaler was launched in Johannesburg by Voortrekkerpers, with Hendrik Verwoerd (future prime minister and architect) as its first editor. It was a pro-National Party and played a crucial role in promoting Afrikaner nationalism.

== Births ==
- Eric Bhamuza Sono, captain of Orlando Pirates F.C. and was the father of soccer player & coach Jomo Sono (d. 1964)
- 29 March – Marike de Klerk, politician, First Lady of South Africa, wife of F. W. de Klerk (d. 2001)
- 5 May – Ray Ntlokwana, actor, affectionately known as "Velaphi" following his lead role in the SABC Xhosa play, Velaphi
- 1 July – Ebrahim Ismail Ebrahim, political activist (d. 2021)
- 4 July – Clive Scott (actor), actor
- 6 July – Bessie Head, writer (d. 1986)
- 4 August – Koos van der Merwe, politician (d. 2024)
- 18 September – Ivy Matsepe-Casaburri, politician, in Kroonstad. (d. 2009)
- 19 October – Jonas Gwangwa, jazz musician, songwriter and producer

== Railways ==
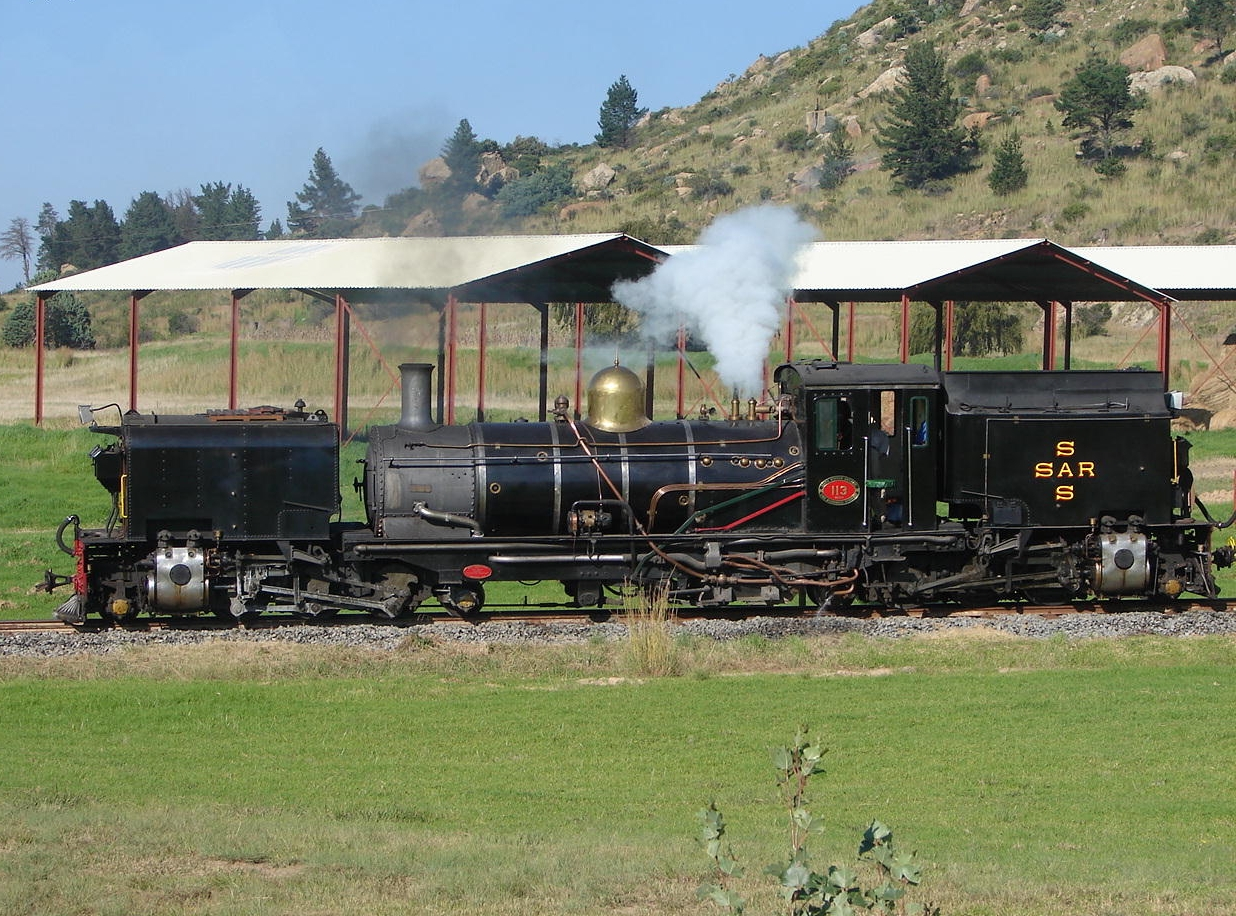
Class NG G16

=== Locomotives ===
Four new locomotive types, three steam and one electric, enter service on the South African Railways (SAR):

- The first of 235 Class 19D 4-8-2 Mountain type steam locomotives.
- A single Class 21 2-10-4 Texas type steam locomotive.
- The first of thirty-four Class NG G16 narrow gauge 2-6-2+2-6-2 Double Prairie type Garratt locomotives.
- Three German-built 3 kV DC Class 2E electric locomotives.
