= 1940 in South Africa =

- Decades: 1920s; 1930s; 1940s; 1950s; 1960s
- See also: List of years in South Africa

The following lists events that happened during 1940 in South Africa.

== Incumbents ==
- Monarch: King George VI.
- Governor-General : Sir Patrick Duncan
- Prime Minister: Jan Christiaan Smuts.
- Chief Justice: James Stratford.

== Events ==
January

- 27 – A peace resolution introduced in the Parliament of South Africa is defeated 81–59.
- 29 – The Herenigde Nasionale Party is established.

June

- 11 – The Union of South Africa declares war on Italy.

December

- 3 – The Royal Navy battle cruiser HMS Renown and aircraft carrier HMS Ark Royal arrive at Cape Town.

== Births ==
Flag of South Africa

- 19 January – Barend du Plessis, government minister
- 31 January – Kitch Christie, Springbok rugby coach. (d. 1998)
- 9 February – J. M. Coetzee, writer and 2003 Nobel Prize laureate.
- 18 February – Prue Leith, restaurateur and broadcaster.
- 22 February – Johnson Mlambo, Pan Africanist Congress politician.
- 8 March – Fred Brownell, herald, designer of the Flag of South Africa.
- 6 June – Tiger Lance, cricketer. (d. 2010)
- 28 August – Joseph Shabalala, choral director (d. 2020)
- 9 October – Manto Tshabalala-Msimang, politician. (d. 2009)
- 21 October – Manfred Mann, South African-British rock musician.
- 25 December – Aziz Pahad, politician (d. 2023)

== Deaths ==
- 1 June – Jan F. E. Celliers, poet, writer and dramatist. (b. 1865)
- 10 August – Abe Bailey, diamond tycoon, politician, financier and cricketer. (b. 1864)

== Railways ==
=== Railway lines opened ===
- 12 January – Transvaal: Crown to Langlaagte, 3 miles 18 chains (5.2 kilometres).
- 2 December – Transvaal: Germiston to Jupiter, 2 miles 68 chains (4.6 kilometres).

== Sources ==
- Faulkner, Donna (2014). Mandela. New Word City. ISBN 978-1-61230-749-7.
