= 1933 in South Africa =

- Decades: 1910s; 1920s; 1930s; 1940s; 1950s
- See also: List of years in South Africa

The following lists events that happened during 1933 in South Africa.

== Incumbents ==
- Monarch: King George V.
- Governor-General and High Commissioner for Southern Africa: The Earl of Clarendon.
- Prime Minister: James Barry Munnik Hertzog.
- Chief Justice: John Wessels.

== Events ==
May

- 29 – The first consignment of 10,000 Afrikaans Bibles arrives at Cape Town from London on the Union-Castle Line's Carnarvon Castle.

== Births ==
- 10 March – Allister Sparks, writer, journalist, and political commentator (d. 2016)
- 13 March – Solomon Sedibane, sculptor, in Sekhukhuneland in Transvaal.
- 29 March – Stanley Mokgoba, president of the Pan Africanist Congress, in Pietersburg.
- 11 April – Denis Goldberg, anti-apartheid movement activist, accused No. 3 in the Rivonia Trial (d. 2020)
- 28 October – Constand Viljoen, South African military commander, politician & co-founded the Afrikaner Volksfront (Afrikaner People's Front)
- 15 December – Donald Woods, journalist and anti-apartheid activist (d. 2001).

== Deaths ==
- 13 March – Robert T. A. Innes, astronomer and secretary-accountant at the Cape observatory. (b. 1861)

== Sports ==
- 8 July – The first rugby union test match is played between the Wallabies of Australia and the Springboks of South Africa at Newlands.
