= Daniël de Waal =

South African judge

The Honourable Daniël de Waal KC

Judge President of the Transvaal Provincial Division of the Supreme Court of South Africa
- In office 1927–1937
- Preceded by: John Stephen Curlewis
- Succeeded by: Benjamin Tindall

Judge of the Transvaal Provincial Division of the Supreme Court of South Africa
- In office 1920–1927

Personal details
- Born: 10 September 1873 Stellenbosch, Cape Colony
- Died: 19 February 1938 (aged 64) Pretoria, Union of South Africa
- Education: Victoria College; Trinity Hall, Cambridge
- Profession: Advocate

Daniël de Waal KC (10 September 1873 – 19 February 1938) was a South African judge who served as Judge President of the Transvaal Provincial Division of the Supreme Court of South Africa.

== Early life and education ==
De Waal was born in Stellenbosch and received his schooling at the Stellenbosch Gymnasium, after which he went on to the Victoria College in Stellenbosch, completing his course in 1894. He then to England, where he obtained the Law Tripos at Trinity Hall, Cambridge, in 1896.

== Career ==
De Waal returned to Cape Town and joined the Cape Bar in January 1897, but a month later he began practising as an advocate in Pretoria. During the Second Boer War he served on commando operations for the Boers and after the war he was re-admitted to the Transvaal Bar in July 1902. With the outbreak of World War I, he served on General Louis Botha's staff where he acted as chief provost. He also participated in the German South West Africa Campaign.

After the war he returned to his advocate practice and in 1919 he took silk. In October 1919, De Waal was made acting judge in the Griqualand-West Local Division of the Supreme Court of South Africa. In August 1920 he was appointed judge of the Transvaal Provincial Division and in 1927 he became Judge-President of the Transvaal Division, a post he occupied until 1937 when he retired for health reasons.

== Personal life ==
De Waal was a talented sportsman and in 1891, while still in school, he played for Stellenbosch against the visiting rugby team of the British Isles. He also was the Victor Ludorum of Victoria College, from 1892 to 1894.

De Waal was married twice. His first marriage was to Christina MacMillan and they had two children. After her death in 1906, he married Helena Letitia Botha, the daughter of General Louis Botha and they had four children.

== See also ==
- List of Judges President of the Gauteng Division of the High Court of South Africa
