= 1935 in South Africa =

- Decades: 1910s; 1920s; 1930s; 1940s; 1950s
- See also: List of years in South Africa

The following lists events that happened during 1935 in South Africa.

== Incumbents ==
- Monarch: King George V.
- Governor-General and High Commissioner for Southern Africa: The Earl of Clarendon.
- Prime Minister: James Barry Munnik Hertzog.
- Chief Justice: John Wessels.

== Events ==
February

- 1 – The South African Airways takes over the South West African Airways which has been providing a weekly airmail service between Windhoek and Kimberley since 1932.

Unknown date

- Cape Town begins to reclaim 480 acres (1.9 km^{2}) of land on the Foreshore.

== Births ==
- 30 January – Albie Sachs, activist and a former judge on the Constitutional Court of South Africa.
- 5 February – Johannes Geldenhuys, military commander (d. 2018)
- 5 March – Durant Sihlali, artist. (d. 2004)
- 1 April – Cyril Karabus, paediatric oncologist (d. 2026)
- 22 April – Mac Maharaj, political activist, in Newcastle, KwaZulu-Natal.
- 29 April – Tom van Vollenhoven, Springbok rugby player. (d. 2017)
- 26 May – Sheila Steafel, actress in the United Kingdom. (d. 2019)
- 29 May – André P. Brink, Sestiger author, in Vrede. (d. 2015)
- 23 August – Sol Kerzner, business magnate, founder of Southern Sun Hotel Group, Sun International & Kerzner International (d. 2020)
- 30 August – Peter Cartwright, actor. (d. 2013)
- 1 November – Gary Player, professional golfer.
- 11 November – Esther Mahlangu, artist from the Ndebele nation, bold large-scale contemporary paintings that reference her Ndebele heritage

== Deaths ==
- 28 March – Tielman Roos, politician and Minister of Justice. (b. 1879)
- 2 November – Jock Cameron, South African cricketer. (b. 1905)
- 20 May – Nontetha, Xhosa prophet

== Railways ==
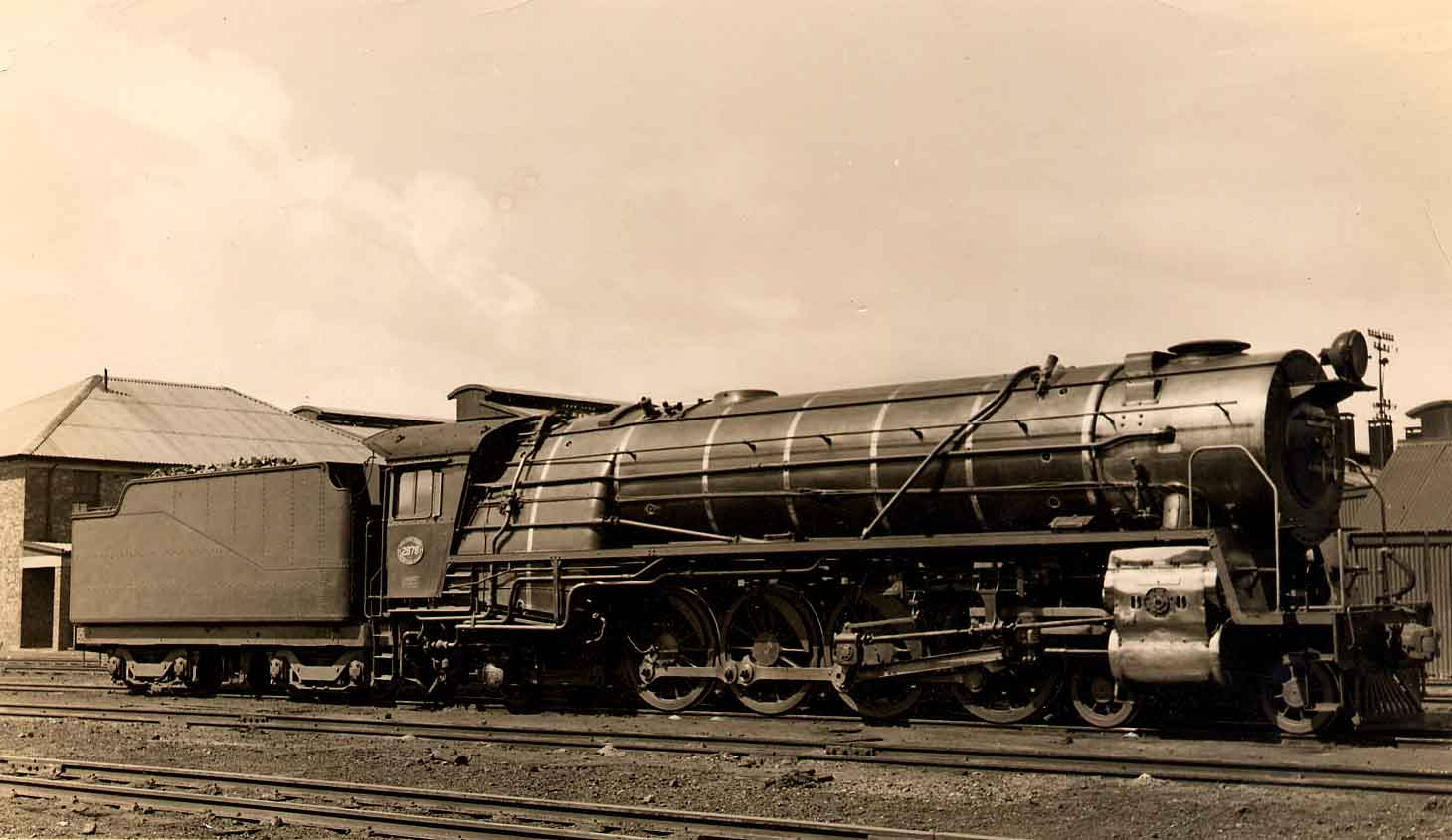
Class 15E

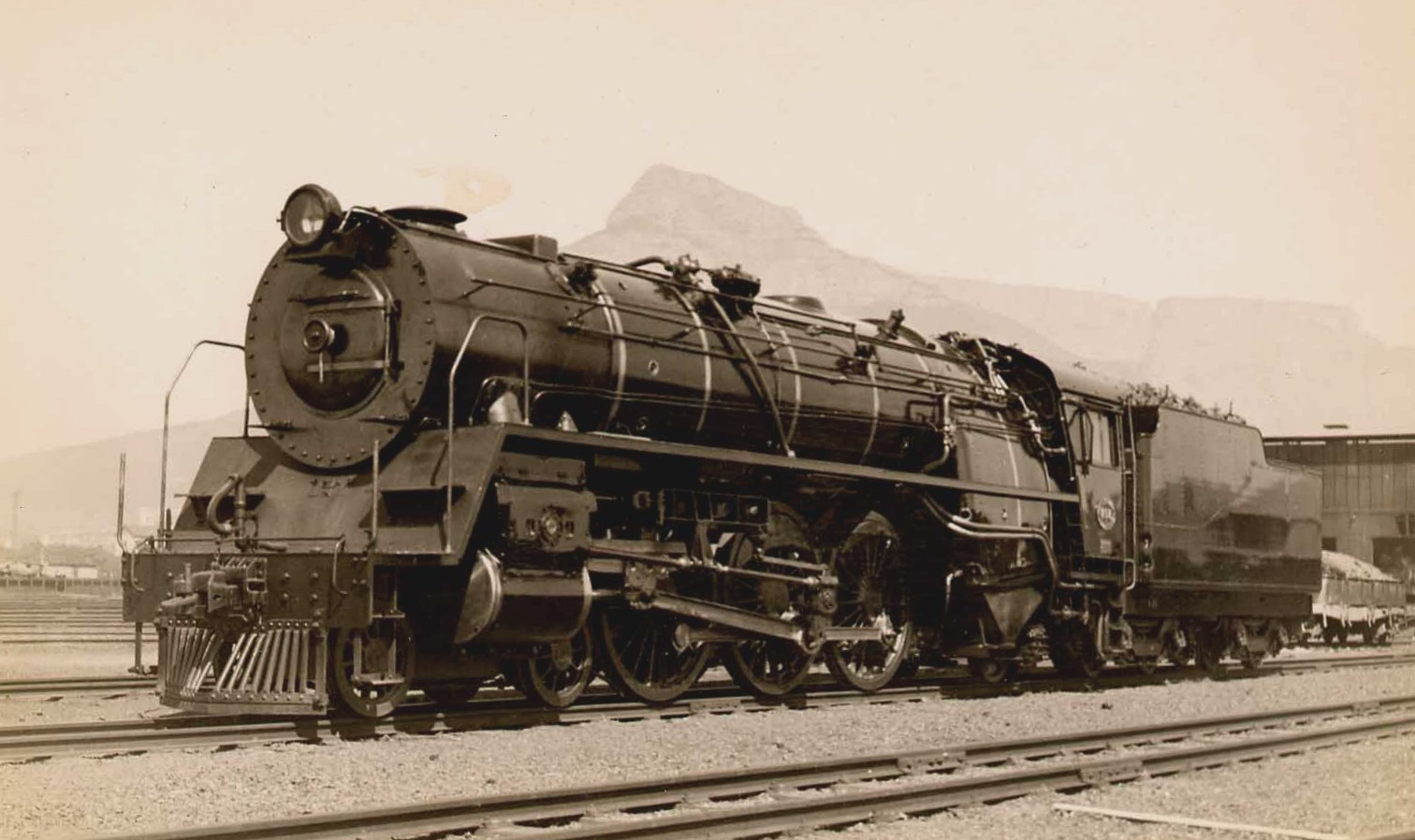
Class 16E

=== Railway lines opened ===
- 19 October – Transvaal – Springs to Kaydale, 19 miles 68 chains (31.9 kilometres).

=== Locomotives ===
Four new Cape gauge locomotive types enter service on the South African Railways (SAR), all with rotary cam poppet valve gear:

- The first of forty-four Class 15E 4-8-2 Mountain type locomotives.
- Six Class 16E 4-6-2 Pacific type passenger steam locomotives.
- Fifty Class 19C 4-8-2 Mountain type locomotives.
- A single experimental Class 20 2-10-2 Santa Fe type locomotive.

== Sports ==
=== Cricket ===
- 2 July – The South African cricket team wins its first test cricket match against the English cricket team at Lord's Cricket Ground.
