= Gerrie Maritz =

South African judge

The Honourable Gerrie Maritz KC

Judge President of the Transvaal Provincial Division of the Supreme Court of South Africa
- In office 1947–1959
- Preceded by: Charles Barry
- Succeeded by: Frans Rumpff

Judge of the Transvaal Provincial Division of the Supreme Court of South Africa
- In office 1930–1947

Personal details
- Born: Gerhardus Jacobus Maritz; 7 December 1889 Klerksdorp, South African Republic
- Died: 16 July 1964 (aged 74) Pretoria, South Africa
- Education: Victoria College; Trinity College, Oxford
- Profession: Advocate

Gerhardus Jacobus Maritz KC (7 December 1889 – 16 July 1964) was a South African judge who served as Judge President of the Transvaal Provincial Division of the Supreme Court of South Africa from 1947 until 1959.

== Early life and education ==
Maritz was born in Klerksdorp, the son of Cornelius François Maritz and his wife, Anna Maria Beyers. His great-grandfather was the Voortrekker leader, Gerrit Maritz, and his mother was a sister of General Christian Frederick Beyers.

Maritz was educated at Stellenbosch, where he attended the Boys High School and then Victoria College. He graduated in 1908 and earned a Rhodes Scholarship, which allowed him to further his studies at Trinity College, Oxford, where he obtained a Bachelor of Arts in 1912.

== Career ==
Maritz qualified for the Middle Temple in November 1912 and began practising as an advocate in Pretoria I 1913. During the Rebellion of 1914, he sympathised with the rebels and in an effort to join the rebel armed forces, he was arrested and imprisoned at Nylstroom and later in Pretoria. After the rebellion ended and Maritz was set free, he was not welcomed back by the Pretoria Bar. As a result, Maritz, along with Tielman Roos and Oswald Pirow, formed an alternative Bar, the so-called Rebel-Bar.

Maritz took silk in 1926 and in 1930 he was made judge of the Transvaal Provincial Division of the Supreme Court. In September 1947, he became Judge-President of the Transvaal Division and served in this capacity till his retirement in 1959.

== Personal life ==
Maritz did not take much part in public life but from 1951 until 1957, he was chancellor of the University of South Africa. He married Jessie Wilhelmina de Villiers, the sister of Judge of Appeal, Sir Jean Etienne Reenen de Villiers and the couple had four children.

== See also ==
- List of Judges President of the Gauteng Division of the High Court of South Africa
