= Charles Barry (disambiguation) =

Sir Charles Barry (1795–1860) was an English architect.

Charles Barry may also refer to:

- Charles Barry Jr. (1823–1900), son of Sir Charles Barry, English architect
- Charles Barry (judge) (1877–1956), South African judge
- Charles Barry (tennis) (born 2001), Irish tennis player
- Charles Robert Barry (1823–1897), Irish politician and lawyer
- Charles David Barry (1859–1928), Irish cricketer and tennis player
