= 1939 in South Africa =

- Decades: 1910s; 1920s; 1930s; 1940s; 1950s
- See also: List of years in South Africa

The following lists events that happened during 1939 in South Africa.

== Incumbents ==
- Monarch: King George VI.
- Governor-General and High Commissioner for Southern Africa: Sir Patrick Duncan (starting 5 April).
- Prime Minister: James Barry Munnik Hertzog (until 5 September), Jan Christiaan Smuts (starting 5 September).
- Chief Justice: James Stratford.

== Events ==
September

- 2 – J. B. M. Hertzog puts his case to the National Assembly for South Africa to remain neutral in the Second World War, against Jan Smuts who supports a Commonwealth alliance.
- 4 – Jan Smuts becomes the 4th Prime Minister of South Africa for the second time.
- 5 – The National Assembly votes on a motion whether or not to join the war and Jan Smuts wins by 13 votes.
- 6 – The Union of South Africa declares war on Germany.

Unknown date

- The University of Pretoria's official university newspaper, Die Perdeby, is established.

== Births ==
- 9 February – Janet Suzman, actress
- 6 March – Lina Spies, Afrikaans poet and academic.
- 18 March – John W. de Gruchy, academic.
- 25 March – Pius Langa, Chief Justice of the Constitutional Court of South Africa.
- 4 April – Hugh Masekela, jazz musician (d. 2018)
- 12 April – Lyall Watson, marine biologist (d. 2008)
- 21 June – Essop Pahad, politician.
- 7 July – Gilbert Ramano, military commander (d. 2025)
- 12 August – David King, chemist
- 19 August – Caiphus Semenya, composer and musician.
- 14 September – Mary Twala, actress, mother of TV personality, Somizi Mhlongo (d. 2020)
- 16 September – Breyten Breytenbach, dissident poet (d. 2024)
- 27 September – Lydia Mokgokoloshi, actress
- 16 September – Breyten Breytenbach, writer and painter.
- 16 October – Tertius Delport, lawyer and politician (d. 2023)
- 26 October – Karel Schoeman, novelist (d. 2017)
- 25 November – Janette Deacon, archaeologist specialising in rock art conservation

== Deaths ==
- 16 October – Charlotte Maxeke, religious leader and political activist. (b. 1871)

== Railways ==
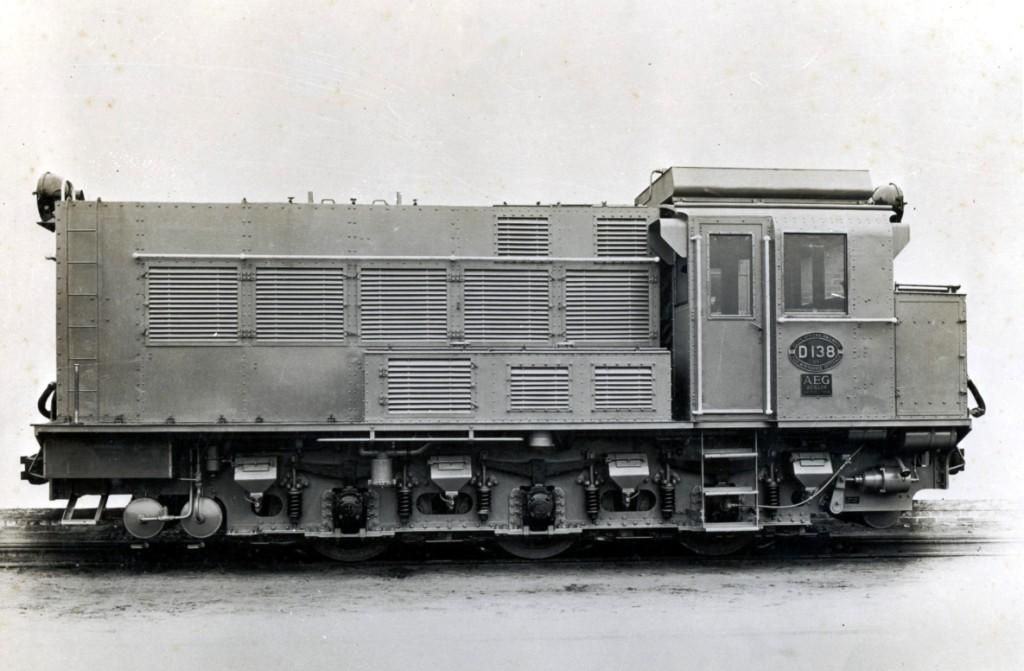
Class DS1

=== Locomotives ===
The first two diesel-electric locomotive types enter service on the South African Railways (SAR):

- A single Class DS AEG shunting engine enters service at the Congella yards near Durban.
- A second shunting locomotive, the Class DS1, enters SAR service while another is delivered to the Electricity Supply Commission.
- The Hollandse Anneming Maatschappij, constructors of a new Table Bay harbour, imports a small 0-4-0T locomotive as on-site construction engine, later employed as SAR dock shunter.

== Sports ==
- 3 March – In Durban, the Timeless Test begins between England and South Africa, the longest game of cricket ever played. It is abandoned twelve days later when the English team has to catch the ship for home.
