= Charles Barry (judge) =

South African judge

The Honourable Charles Barry KC

Judge President of the Transvaal Provincial Division of the Supreme Court of South Africa
- In office 1943–1947
- Preceded by: Leopold Greenberg
- Succeeded by: Gerrie Maritz

Judge of the Transvaal Provincial Division of the Supreme Court of South Africa
- In office 1927–1943

Personal details
- Born: Charles Edward Barry; 30 September 1877 Sea Point, Cape Colony
- Died: 11 April 1956 (aged 78) Pretoria, South Africa
- Education: Trinity College, Oxford
- Profession: Advocate

Charles Edward Barry KC (30 September 1877 – 11 April 1956) was a South African judge who served as Judge President of the Transvaal Provincial Division of the Supreme Court of South Africa.

== Early life and education ==
Barry was born Sea Point, Cape Town, his father, James Michael Barry, was a Cape attorney and his mother, Johanna Philippina Kuhnhardt, was a celebrated linguist.

Barry received his education in Europe, first in Heidelberg, Germany, and then at St Paul's School, London. After his schooling, he went on to Trinity College, Oxford, where in 1900 he earned his BA in Classics. While at Oxford he also excelled in sports, such as cricket, rowing and he captained the university's first rugby team.

== Career ==
After university he worked in London for a steamship company, studying law part-time. In 1904 he was admitted to the Inner Temple and next year he returned to South Africa and joined the Pretoria Bar. He took silk in December 1922 and in June 1926 received an acting judge appointment at the Transvaal Provincial Division. Barry was appointed puisne judge of the Transvaal Provincial Division of the Supreme Court on 1 March 1927, and he became judge president in 1943. He retired in September 1947.

== See also ==
- List of Judges President of the Gauteng Division of the High Court of South Africa
