= Arthur Weir Mason =

South African judge

The Honourable Sir Arthur Weir Mason
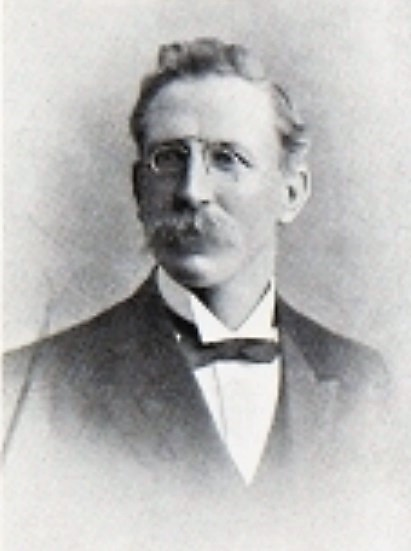

Judge President of the Transvaal Provincial Division of the Supreme Court of South Africa
- In office 1923–1924
- Preceded by: Sir John Wessels
- Succeeded by: John Stephen Curlewis

Judge of the Transvaal High Court
- In office 1902–1923

Judge of the Natal Supreme Court
- In office 1896–1902

Personal details
- Born: 2 August 1860 Palmerton, Pondoland, Cape Colony
- Died: 8 June 1924 (aged 63) Pretoria, Union of South Africa
- Education: University of London
- Profession: Attorney, Advocate

Sir Arthur Weir Mason (2 August 1860 – 8 June 1924) was a South African judge who served as Judge President of the Transvaal Provincial Division of the Supreme Court of South Africa.

== Early life and education ==
Mason was born in Pondoland, a rural area in the eastern part of the Cape Colony, but spent his early life in Durban and was sent to England to receive his schooling in Bath and Eastbourne. He later attended the University of London and in 1879 obtained the BA degree with honours in Classics and German.

== Career ==
In 1880, Mason returned to Natal, where he qualified as an attorney and in 1884 he was admitted as an advocate. He mainly practised in Pietermaritzburg and in January 1896 became a puisne judge of the Natal Supreme Court. On several occasions he acted for Sir Michael Gallwey as chief justice of Natal. After the Second Boer War he was appointed a judge of the Transvaal Supreme Court. In 1922 he was knighted and from 13 March 1923 to the time of his death, he was Judge President of the Transvaal Provincial Division of the Supreme Court.

== See also ==
- List of Judges President of the Gauteng Division of the High Court of South Africa
