= 1931 in South Africa =

- Decades: 1910s; 1920s; 1930s; 1940s; 1950s
- See also: List of years in South Africa

The following lists events that happened during 1931 in South Africa.

== Incumbents ==
- Monarch: King George V.
- Governor-General:
  - Jacob de Villiers (until 26 January).
  - The Earl of Clarendon (starting 26 January)
- Prime Minister: James Barry Munnik Hertzog.
- Chief Justice: Jacob de Villiers.

== Events ==
January

- 26 – George Villiers, 6th Earl of Clarendon, is appointed the 5th Governor-General of the Union of South Africa.

December

- 11 – The Statute of Westminster establishes a status of legislative equality between the self-governing dominions of the Commonwealth of Australia, Canada, Irish Free State, Dominion of Newfoundland, Dominion of New Zealand and Union of South Africa.

== Births ==
- 21 January – Joseph Engenas Matlhakanye Lekganyane, founder of the St Engenas Zion Christian Church.
- 26 February – Isaac Lesiba Maphotho, anti-apartheid activist. (d. 2019)
- 10 March – Raymond Ackerman, businessman, founder of Pick 'n Pay supermarket group.
- 19 April – Kobie Coetsee, politician, in Ladybrand. (d. 2000)
- 5 July – Ismail Mahomed, South African and Namibian Chief Justice. (d. 2000)
- 15 July – Gene Louw, politician.
- 27 September – Thandi Klaasen, jazz musician (d. 2017).
- 4 October – Basil D'Oliveira, cricketer (d. 2011)
- 7 October – Desmond Tutu, social rights activist and Anglican bishop, in Klerksdorp (d. 2021).
- 24 November – Arthur Chaskalson, President of the Constitutional Court of South Africa & Chief Justice of South Africa.
- 12 December – Jafta Masemola, anti-apartheid activist. (d. 1994)
- 31 December – Dorothy Nyembe, activist and politician (d. 1998).

== Deaths ==
- 9 January – Second Boer War General Johannes Gerhardus Celliers at age 70.
- 24 January – Sir Percy FitzPatrick, author, politician and mining financier. (b. 1862)
- 24 October – Sir Murray Bisset, South African cricketer and Governor of Southern Rhodesia (b. 1876)

== Railways ==
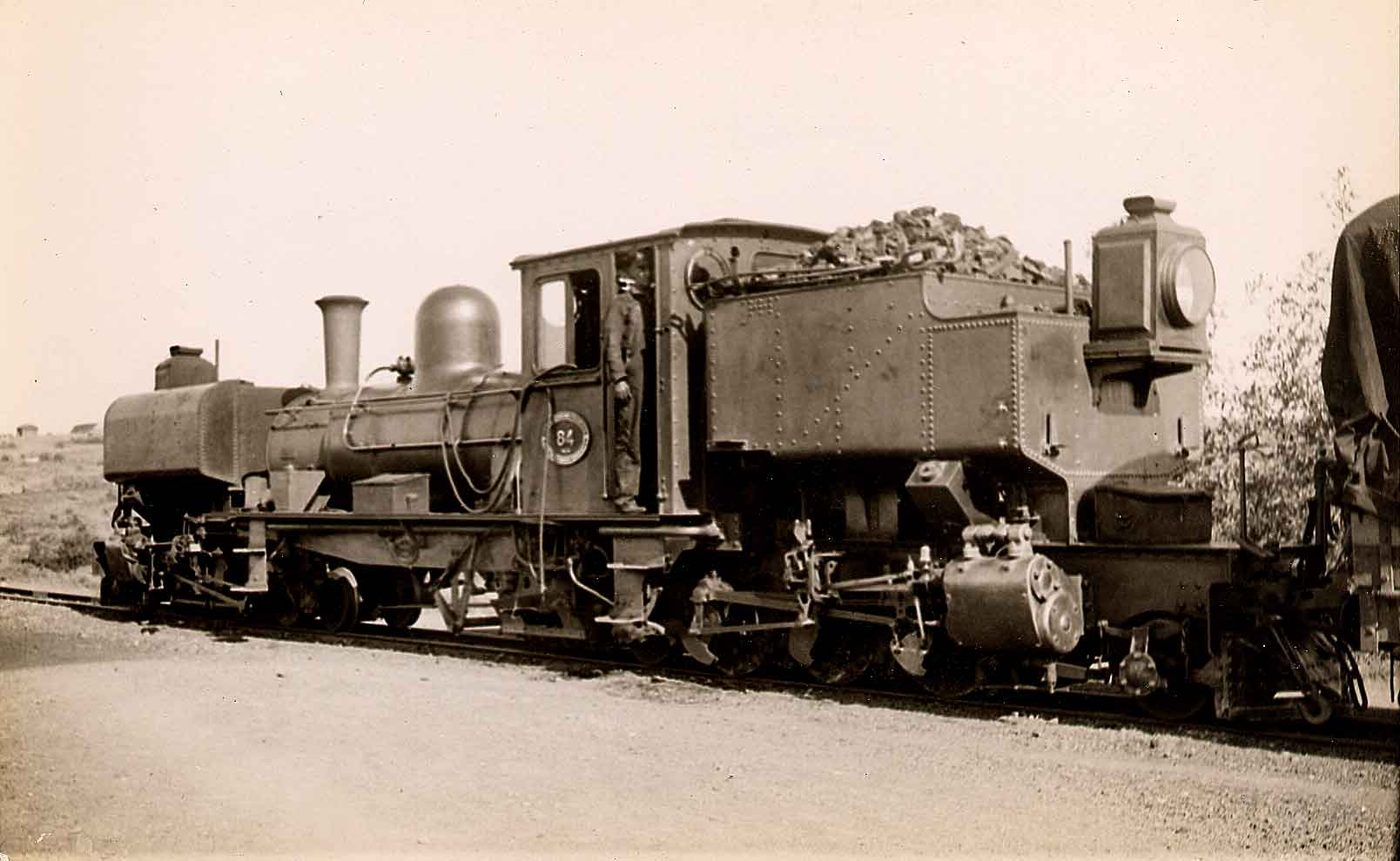
Class NG G14 Garratt

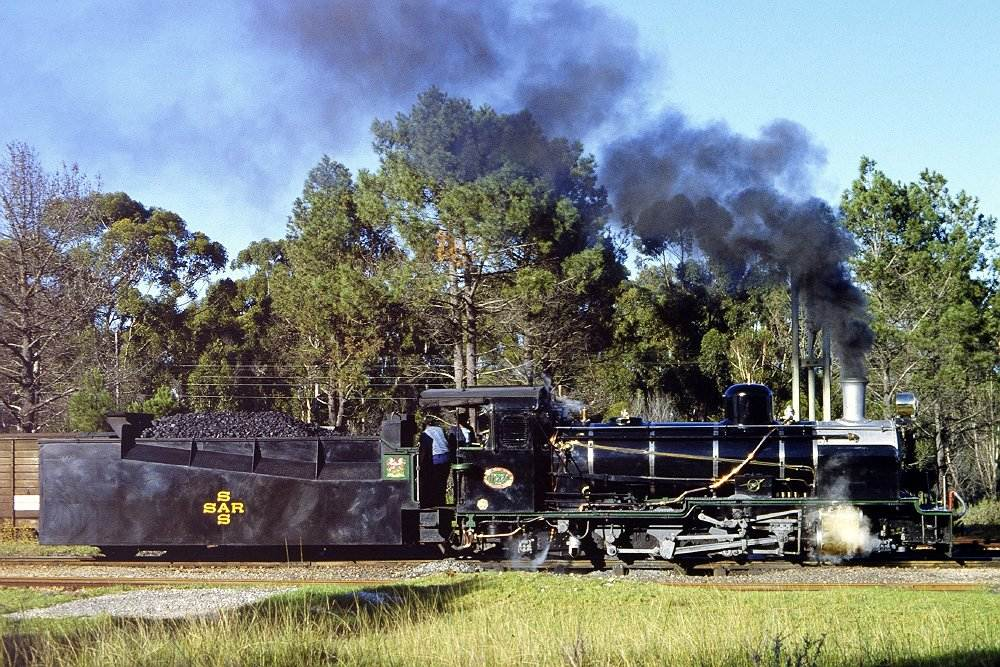
Class NG15 Kalahari

=== Railway lines opened ===
- 3 June – Cape – Molteno to Jamestown, 41 miles 72 chains (67.4 kilometres).
- 1 July – Natal – Chailey to Mount Alida, 25 miles 33 chains (40.9 kilometres).
- 1 July – Natal – Greyville Cabin to Berea Road, 1 mile 36 chains (2.3 kilometres).

=== Locomotives ===
Two new narrow gauge steam locomotive types enter service on the South African Railways (SAR):

- A single light Class NG G14 2-6-2+2-6-2 Garratt locomotive.
- Three 2-8-2 Mikado locomotives for the Otavi Mining and Railway Company in South West Africa. In 1960 they would become the Class NG15 Apple Express Kalaharis on the narrow gauge Avontuur Railway.

== Sports ==
=== Rugby ===
- 19 December – The South African Springboks beat Ireland 8–3 in Ireland.
