= JMI =

JMI may refer to:

- Jamia Millia Islamia, a central university located in New Delhi, India
- Java Metadata Interface specification for Java programming language
- Jahangirabad Media Institute, a media institute in India
- James Madison Institute, a free-market American think tank headquartered in Tallahassee, Florida, United States
- Jennings Musical Instruments, an electronic instrument company
- Jeunesses Musicales International, a youth music NGO
- Jewish Music Institute, an arts organisation based at the University of London's School of Oriental and African Studies
- Jimi language (Nigeria) (ISO 639 language code jmi)
- Jordan Media Institute, a non-profit educational entity focusing on journalism
- JMI – Journal of Music in Ireland

== See also ==
- Jeffersonville, Madison and Indianapolis Railroad (JM&I)
- JML (disambiguation)
