= South African Clayton Railmotor =

1929 design of steam railmotor

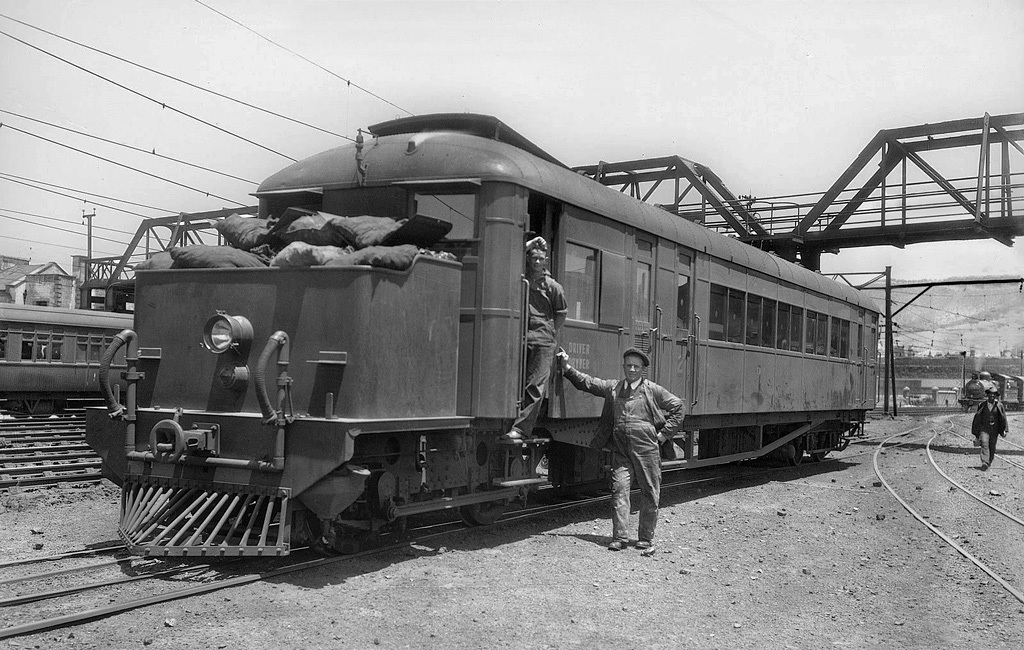
- Clayton Railmotor no. RM11, c. 1929
Type and origin
- Power type: Steam
- Designer: Clayton Carriage and Wagon
- Builder: Clayton Carriage and Wagon
- Build date: 1928
- Total produced: 1
Specifications
- Configuration
  - Whyte: 0-4-0+4 (Four-coupled)
  - AAR: B-2
  - UIC: B'2'n2t
- Driver: 2nd coupled axle
- Gauge: 3 ft 6 in (1,067 mm) Cape gauge
- Pivot centres: 42 ft 6 in (12,954 mm)
- Fuel type: Coal
- Boiler
  - Type: Vertical, 72 tubes
- Cylinders: Two
- Valve type: Piston
- Couplers: Johnston link-and-pin
Career
- Operators: South African Railways
- Class: Railmotor
- Number in class: 1
- Numbers: RM11
- Delivered: 1929
- First run: 1929

The South African Railways Clayton Railmotor of 1929 was a steam railmotor.

In 1929, the South African Railways acquired a single self-contained steam railmotor for low-volume passenger service. The vehicle was a vertical boilered steam locomotive with a passenger coach as an integral part of the locomotive itself.

== Steam railmotors ==
The first steam railmotors in South Africa were the Cape Government Railways steam railmotor no. M6 and the Central South African Railways steam railmotor no. M2 which were introduced in 1906 and 1907 respectively. During the years since its establishment in 1910, several petrol-driven railmotors had been placed in low-volume passenger service by the South African Railways (SAR). In 1928, despite its declared preference for petrol-engine railcars, the Railways Administration decided to acquire a single experimental steam railmotor.

== Manufacturer ==
An order for one steam railmotor was placed with Clayton Carriage and Wagon in June 1928, at a purchase price of £4,780 plus £65 for a spare geared wheelset. Although it was initially intended for Durban, the railmotor was delivered to Cape Town instead. It was erected in the Salt River workshops and numbered RM11. After initial trial runs, the railmotor entered regular service on 24 September 1929.

== Characteristics ==
The vertical boiler of the engine was located to the rear of the front driving compartment and had an outer cylindrical shell and an inner firebox, with the middle portion of the firebox pressed into a square cross-section. The coal bunker and water tank were mounted on the power bogie and the bunker part was separate from the coach body to enable it to swivel with the power bogie. The engine unit had two cylinders with piston valves which drove a spur gear on the driving axle, while the two axles of the power bogie were connected with coupling rods. For bi-directional operation, the railmotor had a second driving cab at the rear end of the coach.

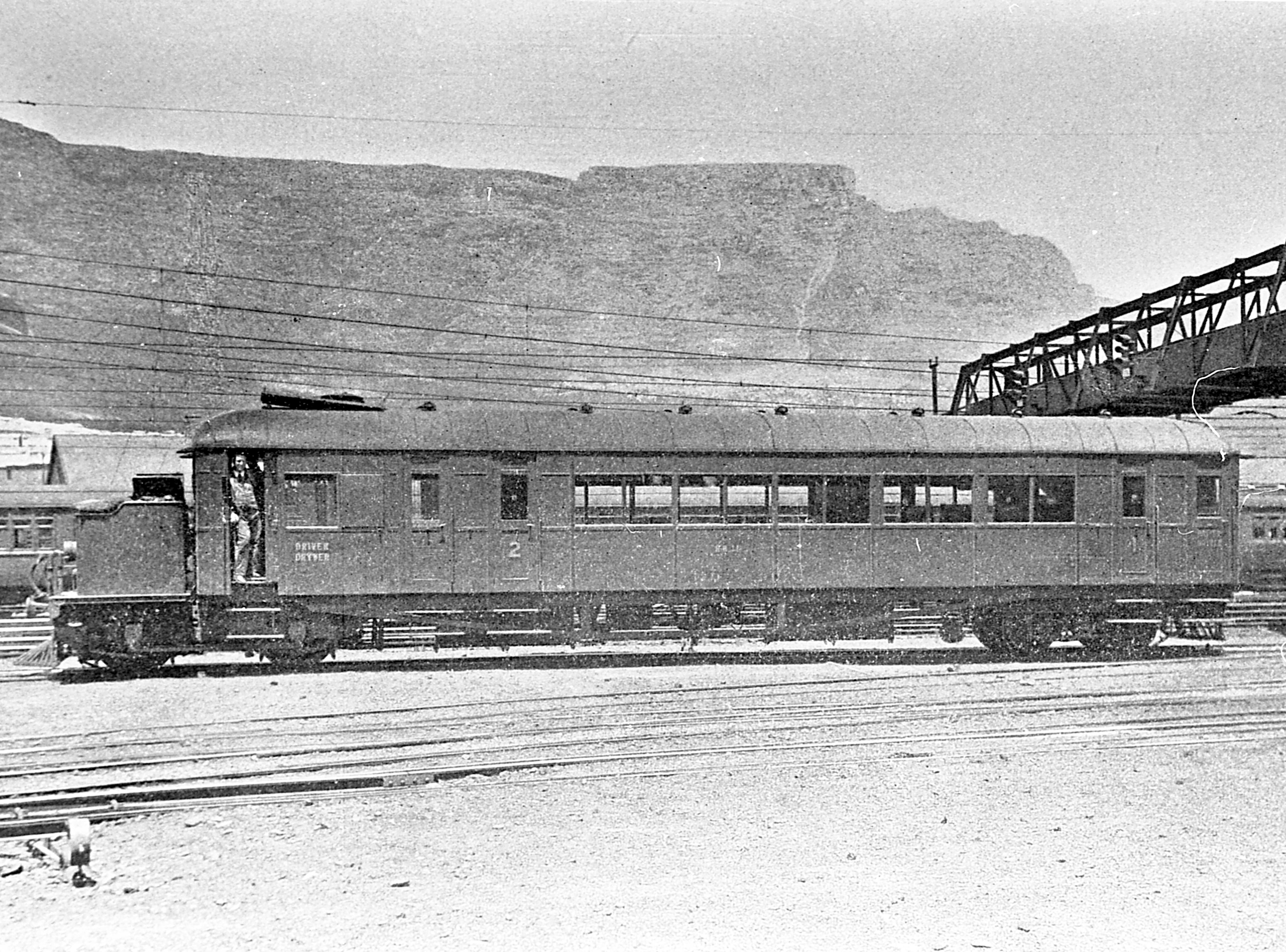

The rear end of the railmotor rode on conventional passenger bogies. The coach had the capacity to seat 30 first class and 35 second class passengers in two compartments and it also had a baggage compartment immediately to the rear of the front driving cab and boiler.

The vehicle was equipped with the old Johnston link-and-pin couplers instead of the new AAR knuckle couplers that were introduced in 1927. The reason was most likely that the commuter carriages in service at the time were all still equipped with the older couplers.

== Service ==
The railmotor was initially placed in service on the Milnerton line for a brief period and often operated with a passenger carriage in tow. When this line was closed to regular traffic on 31 July 1930, the railmotor was transferred to the Cape Flats line.

The railmotor fleet was reported as giving good results and accomplishing the objects of economical working and speedier and more comfortable travel compared to steam train services, since mixed trains on branch lines usually resulted in slower passenger service as a result of frequent stops to load or unload goods.

The Clayton railmotor was later used on the Overberg line to Caledon. No more steam railmotors were acquired, however, and all subsequent railmotor models on the SAR were petrol-driven vehicles.
