= Edward Bhengu =

South African activist (1934–2010)

Edward Sonnyboy Bhengu
- Born: Edward Bhengu; 8 November 1934
- Died: 26 December 2010 (aged 76); Soweto,
- Occupation: politician
- Known for: Founding member of the PAC; anit-apartheid activism
- Political party: Pan-Africanist Congress of Azania

Edward "Sonnyboy" Bhengu (8 November 1934 – 26 December 2010) was a South African activist and founding member of the Pan Africanist Congress of Azania.

Edward 'Sonnyboy' Bhengu, also known affectionately as 'Bra Sanza', was the older brother of poet Don Mattera and was imprisoned numerous times for his anti-apartheid activities. He died in Soweto on 26 December 2010 of liver complications.
