= 1932 Currie Cup =

Domestic rugby union competition

- Countries: South Africa
- Champions: Joint winners: Border (1st title); Western Province (14th title)

The 1932 Currie Cup was the 17th edition of the Currie Cup, the premier domestic rugby union competition in South Africa.

The tournament was jointly won by Border (for the first time) and Western Province (for the 14th time).

== See also ==
- Currie Cup
