= Leopold Greenberg (judge) =

South African judge

The Honourable Leopold Greenberg QC

Judge of the Appellate Division
- In office 1943–1955

Judge President of the Transvaal Provincial Division of the Supreme Court of South Africa
- In office 1938–1943
- Preceded by: Benjamin Tindall
- Succeeded by: Charles Barry

Judge of the Transvaal Provincial Division of the Supreme Court of South Africa
- In office 1924–1938

Personal details
- Born: 21 March 1885 Calvinia, Cape Colony
- Died: 12 September 1964 (aged 79) Johannesburg, Transvaal, South Africa
- Education: South African College
- Profession: Advocate

Leopold Greenberg QC (21 March 1885 – 12 September 1964) was a South African judge who served as Judge President of the Transvaal Provincial Division of the Supreme Court of South Africa and Judge of Appeal.

== Early life and education ==
Greenberg, who was Jewish, was born in Calvinia in the Cape Colony. He attended Grey College in Bloemfontein and in 1900, he relocated to Cape Town, to continue his studies at the South African College, where he obtained a BA (Hons.) degree. After graduating, he started working for a law firm in Johannesburg and studying part-time for his LLB degree, which he obtained in 1907.

== Career ==
In May 1908, Greenberg was admitted to the Cape Town Bar, where he practised from 1909 to 1911. He was admitted to the Bar in Johannesburg in 1911 and took silk as a King's Counsel (K.C.) in 1924 (which became Queen's Counsel (Q.C.) on 6 February 1952), and almost four months after taking silk he became a judge of the Transvaal Provincial Division of the Supreme Court. Greenberg was appointed Judge President of Transvaal Division in 1938, and five years later he was appointed an appellate judge, in which capacity he served until his retirement in March 1955.

== Notable cases and awards ==
Greenberg was the presiding judge in the longdrawn-out trial of Daisy de Melker. After a trial that lasted thirty days, with sixty witnesses, he delivered an ex tempore judgment.

In 1954, the University of Cape Town conferred an honorary LLD upon him and in 1956, the University of the Witwatersrand, also honoured him with a LLD degree.

== See also ==
- List of Judges President of the Gauteng Division of the High Court of South Africa
