= Jack Nel =

South African cricketer (1928–2018)

Personal information
- Full name: John Desmond Nel
- Born: 10 July 1928; Cape Town, Cape Province, South Africa
- Died: 13 January 2018 (aged 89); Pinelands, Western Cape, South Africa
- Batting: Right-handed

International information
- National side: South Africa
- Test debut: 24 December 1949 v Australia
- Last Test: 23 December 1957 v Australia

Career statistics
Competition	Test	First-class
Matches	6	35
Runs scored	150	1,839
Batting average	13.63	31.70
100s/50s	0/0	4/6
Top score	38	217*
Catches/stumpings	1/–	14/–
- Source: Cricinfo, 15 November 2022

John Desmond Nel (10 July 1928 – 13 January 2018) was a South African cricketer who played in six Tests from 1949 to 1957.

Nel played 35 first-class games, top-scoring for his team on several occasions. He then went onto commentating on any matches played at Newlands. He worked as a quantity surveyor.

Nel married Shelagh Mary Finegan in February 1952 and they had three sons and one daughter. He died on 13 January 2018 at the age of 89.
