= Journal of Mathematical Logic =

- Discipline: Mathematics
- Language: English
- Edited by: Chitat Chong, Qi Feng, Theodore A. Slaman, W. Hugh Woodin

Publication details
- History: 2001-present
- Publisher: World Scientific (Singapore)
- Impact factor: 0.900 (2016)

Standard abbreviations
- ISO 4: J. Math. Log.

Indexing
- ISSN: 0219-0613 (print); 1793-6691 (web)

Links
- Journal homepage

The Journal of Mathematical Logic was established in 2001 and is published by World Scientific. It covers the field of mathematical logic and its applications.

== Abstracting and indexing ==
The journal is abstracted and indexed in:

- Current Mathematical Publications
- Mathematical Reviews
- MathSciNet
- Zentralblatt MATH
- Science Citation Index Expanded
- Current Contents/Physical, Chemical and Earth Sciences
- Journal Citation Reports/Science Edition
