= Beestekraal =

- Location within North West (South African province) Location within South Africa
- Coordinates: 25.598°S 27.398°E
- Country: South Africa
- Province: North West
- District: Bojanala
- Municipality: Rustenburg

Area
  - Total: 0.06 km^{2} (0.023 sq mi)

Population (2001)
  - Total: 400
  - Density: 6,700/km^{2} (17,000/sq mi)
- Time zone: UTC+2 (SAST)
- PO box: 0255
- Area code: 012

Beestekraal is a town in Bojanala District Municipality in the North West province of South Africa.
