= Arthur Howard (South African cricketer) =

South African cricketer (born 1936)

Arthur Stanley Howard (born 14 November 1936 in Grahamstown, Cape Province) is a South African former first-class cricketer active 1961 who played for Cambridge University. He appeared in three first-class matches for the university team.
