= South African Class GDA 2-6-2+2-6-2 =

1929 articulated steam locomotive

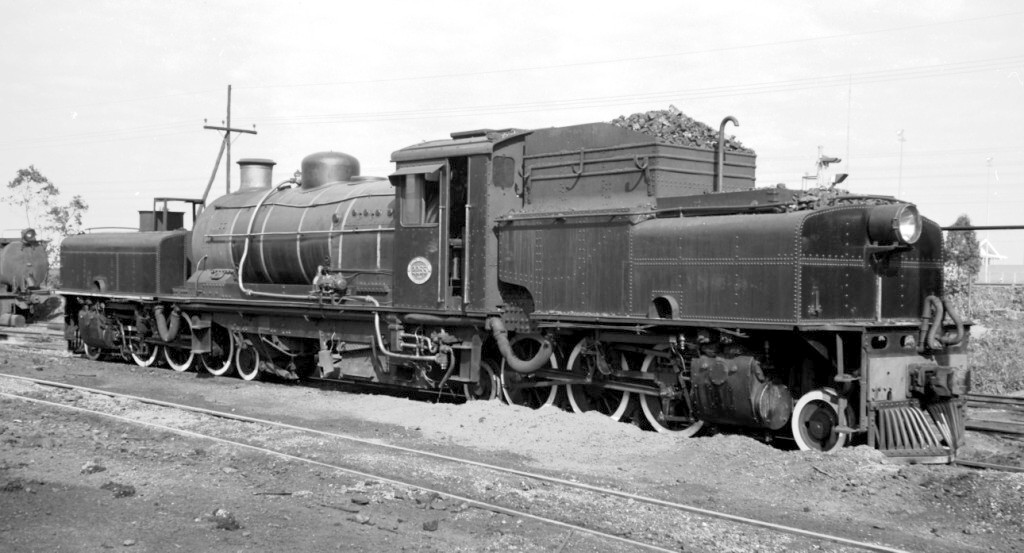
- No. 2255, Stanger Depot in September 1966
Type and origin
- Power type: Steam
- Designer: Beyer, Peacock & Company
- Builder: Linke-Hofmann Werke
- Serial number: 3115–3119
- Model: Class GDA
- Build date: 1929
- Total produced: 5
Specifications
- Configuration
  - Whyte: 2-6-2+2-6-2 (Double Prairie)
  - UIC: 1'C1'+1'C1'h4t
- Driver: 3rd & 4th coupled axles
- Gauge: 3 ft 6 in (1,067 mm) Cape gauge
- Leading dia.: 28 1/2 in (724 mm)
- Coupled dia.: 46 in (1,168 mm)
- Trailing dia.: 28 1/2 in (724 mm)
- Wheelbase: 58 ft 4 in (17,780 mm)
  - Engine: 18 ft 9 in (5,715 mm) each
  - Coupled: 8 ft 6 in (2,591 mm) each
- Pivot centres: 30 ft 6 in (9,296 mm)
- Length
  - Over couplers: 65 ft 11 in (20,091 mm)
- Height: 12 ft 10 1/4 in (3,918 mm)
- Frame type: Bar
- Axle load: 13 LT 14 cwt (13,920 kg)
  - Leading: 12 LT 1 cwt (12,240 kg) front 11 LT 7 cwt (11,530 kg) rear
  - 1st coupled: 13 LT 1 cwt (13,260 kg)
  - 2nd coupled: 13 LT 8 cwt (13,620 kg)
  - 3rd coupled: 13 LT 8 cwt (13,620 kg)
  - 4th coupled: 13 LT 14 cwt (13,920 kg)
  - 5th coupled: 13 LT 13 cwt (13,870 kg)
  - 6th coupled: 12 LT 7 cwt (12,550 kg)
  - Trailing: 8 LT 7 cwt (8,484 kg) front 8 LT 11 cwt (8,687 kg) rear
- Adhesive weight: 79 LT 11 cwt (80,830 kg)
- Loco weight: 119 LT 17 cwt (121,800 kg)
- Fuel type: Coal
- Fuel capacity: 5 LT (5.1 t)
- Water cap.: 2,300 imp gal (10,500 L) front 1,500 imp gal (6,820 L) rear
- Firebox
  - Type: Round-top
  - Grate area: 40 sq ft (3.7 m^{2})
- Boiler
  - Pitch: 7 ft 9 1/4 in (2,369 mm)
  - Diameter: 5 ft 11 3/4 in (1,822 mm)
  - Tube plates: 10 ft 7 7/8 in (3,248 mm)
  - Small tubes: 193: 2 in (51 mm)
  - Large tubes: 32: 5 1/2 in (140 mm)
- Boiler pressure: 180 psi (1,241 kPa)
- Safety valve: Pop
- Heating surface
  - Firebox: 181 sq ft (16.8 m^{2})
  - Tubes: 1,569 sq ft (145.8 m^{2})
  - Total surface: 1,750 sq ft (163 m^{2})
- Superheater
  - Heating area: 370 sq ft (34 m^{2})
- Cylinders: 4
- Cylinder size: 15 in (381 mm) bore 24 in (610 mm) stroke
- Valve gear: Walschaerts
- Valve type: Piston
- Couplers: AAR knuckle
Performance figures
- Tractive effort: 31,690 lbf (141.0 kN) @ 75%
Career
- Operators: South African Railways
- Class: Class GDA
- Number in class: 5
- Numbers: 2255–2259
- Delivered: 1929
- First run: 1929
- Withdrawn: c. 1972

The South African Railways Class GDA 2-6-2+2-6-2 of 1929 was an articulated steam locomotive.

In December 1929, the South African Railways placed five Class GDA Garratt articulated locomotives with a 2-6-2+2-6-2 Double Prairie type wheel arrangement in branch line service on the Natal North Coast line.

== Manufacturer ==
The Class GDA 2-6-2+2-6-2 Double Prairie type Garratt locomotive was built to the same specifications and was for all intents and purposes identical to the Class GD in its main dimensions. They were ordered from Linke-Hofmann Werke in Breslau, Germany in 1929 and numbered 2255 to 2259 upon delivery in December of that same year.

== Characteristics ==
The locomotive had the same tractive effort as the Class GD, was also superheated and also had Walschaerts valve gear to actuate its piston valves. The main differences were the use of bar frames instead of plate frames, differently shaped coal and water bunkers, and a round-topped firebox instead of a Belpaire firebox.

== Service ==
The five locomotives were placed in service working out of Cape Town where they were to join the Class GD on the Overberg branch across Sir Lowry's Pass to Caledon and Bredasdorp, but they were found to be not satisfactory in service and ended up being staged on a siding near the Cape Town sheds for a considerable time. When a question was raised in the local press, enquiring the reason why these brand new locomotives were not being used, they were first moved to a less conspicuous location and shortly afterwards transferred to Natal.

The Natal shops managed to get the locomotives to perform satisfactorily and they were placed in branch line service on the North Coast line in Natal, working around Stanger. This line contains long gradients of 1 in 40 (2½%) and severe curvature with curves of 300 feet (91 metres) radius. Some locomotives later ended up working on the Port Alfred branch. In 1970 a pair was sent to Port Elizabeth where they worked local goods trains until they were all withdrawn by 1972.

== SAR locomotive policy ==
During the term of office of F.R. Collins as SAR chief mechanical engineer from 1922 to 1929 articulated locomotives were in great favour in South Africa, to the extent that the Railway Board of the day instructed that non-articulated engines should only be ordered in exceptional circumstances. His retirement in 1929 brought about a change in policy, however, and there would be an interval of nearly a decade before another articulated Cape gauge Garratt would be acquired.

== Preservation ==
Two locomotives were preserved. No. 2257 was plinthed at Grahamstown station. After the branch line via Grahamstown to Port Alfred fell into disuse, however, an apathetic local government allowed Grahamstown's historic station buildings and especially the plinthed locomotive to be vandalised to an eyesore state by 2013. Another engine, no. 2259, was staged at the South African National Railway & Steam Museum in Krugersdorp.
