= Benjamin Tindall =

South African judge

The Honourable Benjamin Tindall KC

Judge of the Appellate Division
- In office 1938–1949

Judge President of the Transvaal Provincial Division of the Supreme Court of South Africa
- In office 1937–1938
- Preceded by: Daniël de Waal
- Succeeded by: Leopold Greenberg

Judge of the Transvaal Provincial Division of the Supreme Court of South Africa
- In office 1922–1937

Personal details
- Born: Benjamin Arthur Tindall; 26 April 1879 Leliefontein, Cape Colony
- Died: 3 February 1963 (aged 83) Johannesburg, South Africa
- Education: Victoria College
- Profession: Advocate

Benjamin Arthur Tindall KC (26 April 1879 – 3 February 1963) was a South African judge who served as Judge President of the Transvaal Provincial Division of the Supreme Court of South Africa and Judge op Appeal.

== Early life and education ==
Tindall was born in Leliefontein, a small Wesleyan mission station in the Namaqualand region of South Africa. His father, Henry Tindall, was a Wesleyan missionary, who also travelled widely in the area and became an expert on the customs and language of the Nama people. Tindall received his schooling at the Stellenbosch Gymnasium, after which he went on to the Victoria College in Stellenbosch, where he obtained a BA in Literature and an LL.B. in 1901.

== Career ==
Tindall started his working life in the Cape Civil Service and then as private secretary of Justice James Rose Innes. He joined the Cape Bar in January 1903 and a month later he joined the Pretoria Bar. He took silk in 1919 and in 1922 was appointed a judge of the Transvaal Provincial Division. Tindall was appointed Judge President of the Transvaal Division in 1937 and in 1938 he was appointed to the Appellate Division.

== Published works ==
Tindall was the editor of the autobiography by the second Chief Justice of South Africa, James Rose Innes, titled:

- James Rose Innes: Chief Justice of South Africa, 1914-27: Autobiography; first published in 1949.

== See also ==
- List of Judges President of the Gauteng Division of the High Court of South Africa
