= Koopmansfontein =

- Location within Northern Cape Location within South Africa
- Coordinates: 28.241°S 24.037°E
- Country: South Africa
- Province: Northern Cape
- District: Frances Baard
- Municipality: Dikgatlong
- Time zone: UTC+2 (SAST)
- PO box: 8391

Koopmansfontein is a village 61 km north-west of Barkly West, 115 km east of Postmasburg, between Kimberley and Hotazel. Said to have been named after a Griqua called Koopman, who lived at the fountain.
