= South African Jewish Maritime League =

The South African Jewish Maritime League is a Jewish organisation in South Africa. Established in 1938, it is constitutionally constrained to maritime related activities, with a focus on youth development.

The objective of the founders was to establish much needed maritime activity in Israel where the pioneers were considered to be almost devoid of maritime experience.

JML projects have included:

- Establishing a Nautical College in Akko in 1965.
- Acquiring and sailing a former South African-based whaling ship renamed the "Drom Afrika" from South Africa to Israel in 1948. This was said to be the first vessel in the newly established State of Israel's fleet.
- Bringing out combined groups of Arab and Jewish children from Israel to South Africa in "Sailing Together" projects.
- Providing maritime-related study bursaries.
- Donation of yachts placed at various yacht clubs throughout the Western Cape, South Africa, to enable local youths of all races to have access to sailing.
- Providing maritime instruction and sail training to deserving applicants.
- Assisting local youth training institutions.
- Participating in larger joint projects with other organisations, including Izivunguvungu, SASLA, and Cape Windjammers Education Trust.
- Assisting young South Africans from a disadvantaged background to access sailing and other maritime activities.
