= James Stratford =

South African judge

The Right Honourable James Stratford PC

7th Chief Justice of South Africa
- In office 1938–1939
- Preceded by: John Stephen Curlewis
- Succeeded by: Nicolaas Jacobus de Wet

Judge of the Appellate Division
- In office 1927–1938

Judge of the Transvaal Supreme Court and Transvaal Provincial Division
- In office 1921–1927

Personal details
- Born: 19 July 1869 Port Elizabeth, Cape Colony
- Died: 17 January 1952 (aged 83)
- Education: Exeter College, Oxford
- Profession: King's Counsel

James Stratford, PC (19 July 1869 – 17 January 1952) was a South African judge who briefly served as the Chief Justice of the Union of South Africa between 1938 and 1939.

== Background ==
Born in Port Elizabeth, Stratford was educated at St Aiden's College, Grahamstown, then qualified as a surveyor before proceeding to Exeter College, Oxford, where he obtained a BA in Jurisprudence in 1897 and a BCL in 1898. He was called to the English bar by the Inner Temple in 1898 and read in the chambers of George Cave (later the Viscount Cave), who was then a junior barrister at the Chancery bar. He returned to South Africa in 1901 and was admitted to the Cape bar, but transferred to Johannesburg in 1902. He was made King's Counsel in 1912.

In 1921, Stratford was appointed a judge of the Transvaal Provincial Division of the Supreme Court of South Africa. In 1927 he was elevated to the Appellate Division of the Supreme Court. In 1938 he was appointed Chief Justice of the Union of South Africa and sworn of the Privy Council, and retired the following year upon reaching the age of seventy.

Legal offices
| Preceded by John Curlewis | Chief Justice of South Africa; 1938–1939 | Succeeded by Nicolaas Jacobus de Wet |
