= John Stephen Curlewis =

South African lawyer and judge

The Right Honourable John Stephen Curlewis

6th Chief Justice of South Africa
- In office 1936–1938
- Preceded by: Sir John Wessels
- Succeeded by: James Stratford

Judge of the Appellate Division
- In office 1927–1936

Judge President of the Transvaal Supreme Court and Transvaal Provincial Division
- In office 1924–1927
- Preceded by: Sir Arthur Weir Mason
- Succeeded by: Daniël de Waal

Personal details
- Born: 31 March 1863 Paarl, Cape Colony
- Died: 24 August 1940 (aged 77) Pretoria, Transvaal, Union of South Africa
- Education: University of Cape Town

John Stephen Curlewis, PC (31 March 1863 – 24 August 1940) was a South African lawyer and judge who served as the Chief Justice of the Union of South Africa between 1936 and 1938.

== Background ==
Curlewis was born in Paarl, Cape Colony, the son of Rev. J.F. Curlewis the local rector at the Dutch Reformed Church. He was educated at the Diocesan College, Rondebosch, before joining the Cape Civil Service. He then took the LL.B at Cape University, and was called to the Bar of the Cape Supreme Court in 1887. He began to practice in Pretoria in 1888, before being appointed as a judge of the Transvaal High Court in 1903. In 1924 he became the Judge President of the Transvaal Provincial Division and in 1927 he was made a Judge of Appeal.

Curlewis became Chief Justice of the Union of South Africa in 1936, and was made a Privy Counsellor the following year. He resigned from the bench in 1938. He was also acting Governor-General of South Africa in 1933 from June until December under a dormant commission that was invoked.

Legal offices
Preceded by Sir John Wessels	Chief Justice of South Africa; 1936–1938	Succeeded by James Stratford
