= Supreme Court of South Africa =

South African superior court (1910–1997)

The Supreme Court of South Africa was a superior court of law in South Africa from 1910 to 1997. It was made up of various provincial and local divisions with jurisdiction over specific geographical areas, and an Appellate Division which was the highest appellate court in the country.

The Supreme Court of South Africa was dissolved in 1997 when the current Constitution of South Africa came into force. The provincial and local divisions, as well as the supreme courts of the former TBVC states ("Bantustans"), became separate High Courts, while the Appellate Division became the Supreme Court of Appeal (SCA). The High Courts were subsequently restructured by the Superior Courts Act, 2013 into nine provincial divisions of a single High Court of South Africa. The SCA is no longer the highest court because it is subordinate to the jurisdiction of the Constitutional Court.

== History ==
The Supreme Court was created by the South Africa Act 1909 when the Union of South Africa was formed. The Supreme Courts of the four former colonies (the Cape Colony, the Transvaal Colony, the Orange River Colony and the Natal Colony) became provincial divisions of the Supreme Court. The Court of the Eastern Districts and the High Court of Griqualand, both in the Cape, and the High Court of the Witwatersrand in the Transvaal became local divisions under their respective provincial divisions. A new Appellate Division, headed by the Chief Justice of South Africa, was created to hear appeals from the provincial and local divisions.

Until 1950, there was a right of appeal from the Appellate Division of the Supreme Court of South Africa to the Judicial Committee of the Privy Council in London, which was terminated under the terms of the Privy Council Appeals Act 1950 - which was enacted under the government of D.F. Malan, Prime Minister of South Africa from 1948 to 1954.

In 1957, the Eastern Cape Local Division was elevated to provincial status, and in 1969, the Griqualand West Local Division was similarly elevated, becoming the Northern Cape Provincial Division. Over time, two new local divisions were created: the Durban & Coast Local Division under the Natal Provincial Division, and the South Eastern Cape Local Division under the Eastern Cape Provincial Division. During the apartheid era, the Supreme Court of South Africa lost jurisdiction over the quasi-independent bantustans (Transkei, Bophuthatswana, Venda and Ciskei) which created their own Supreme Courts.

The Interim Constitution which came into force in 1994 kept the existing structure of the Supreme Court, but absorbed the Supreme Courts of the bantustans as provincial divisions. The final South African constitution which came into force in 1997 transformed the Appellate Division into the Supreme Court of Appeal, and the provincial and local divisions into High Courts.

== Divisions ==
The South Africa Act had created the Appellate Division, and renamed the existing courts of the colonies as follows:

- The Supreme Court of the Cape of Good Hope (Cape Town) became the Cape of Good Hope Provincial Division (abbreviated CPD; now: WCC of the High Court)
  - The Court of the Eastern Districts of the Cape of Good Hope (Grahamstown) became the Eastern Districts Local Division (EDL)
  - The High Court of Griqualand (Kimberley) became the Griqualand West Local Division (GWL)
- The Supreme Court of the Transvaal (Pretoria) became the Transvaal Provincial Division (TPD; now: GP)
  - The High Court of Witwatersrand (Johannesburg) became the Witwatersrand Local Division (WLD; now: GJ)
- The High Court of the Orange River Colony (Bloemfontein) became the Orange Free State Provincial Division (OPD; now: FB)
- The Supreme Court of Natal (Pietermaritzburg) became the Natal Provincial Division (NPD; now: KZP)
  - The Durban & Coast Circuit Court (Durban) became the Durban & Coast Local Division (DCLD; now: KZD)

Subsequent changes to the divisions were as follows:

- In 1957 the Eastern Districts Local Division was separated from the Cape Provincial Division and became the Eastern Cape Provincial Division (abbreviated E; now: ECG).
- In 1960 the High Court of South-West Africa became the South-West Africa Division (SWA) until 1981, when it became the Supreme Court of South West Africa.
- In 1969 the Griqualand West Local Division was separated from the Cape Provincial Division and became the Northern Cape Provincial Division (NC; now: NCK).
- In 1973 a Transkeian High Court was created at Umtata, becoming the Supreme Court of the Transkei when that homeland attained nominal independence in 1976 as the Transkei bantustan (Tk; now: ECM).
- In 1974 the South Eastern Cape Local Division was created at Port Elizabeth, having jurisdiction (concurrently with the Eastern Cape Provincial Division) over that city and the surrounding districts (SE; now: ECP).
- In 1977 the Supreme Court of Bophuthatswana was created when the homeland attained nominal independence (B; now: NWM). Supreme Courts of Venda (V; now: LT) and Ciskei (Ck; now: ECB) were similarly created in 1979 and 1981 respectively.
