= John Wessels (judge) =

Afrikaner judge

The Right Honourable Sir John Wessels

5th Chief Justice of South Africa
- In office 1932–1936
- Preceded by: Jacob de Villiers
- Succeeded by: John Curlewis

Judge of the Appellate Division
- In office 1923–1936

Judge President of the Transvaal Provincial Division
- In office 1920–1923
- Preceded by: Jacob de Villiers
- Succeeded by: Arthur Weir Mason

Judge of the Transvaal Supreme Court and Transvaal Provincial Division
- In office 1902–1923

Personal details
- Born: 7 March 1862 Cape Town, Cape Colony
- Died: 6 September 1936 (aged 74) Pretoria, South Africa
- Education: South African College; Cape University; Downing College, Cambridge
- Profession: Barrister

Sir Johannes John Wilhelmus Wessels (1862–1936) was an Afrikaner judge of the Appellate Division from 1923 to 1936 and Chief Justice of South Africa from 1932 to 1936.

== Early life and education ==
He was the second of three sons of Cape solicitor Jacobus Christoffel Wessels, Esq. (Joostenberg, Stellenbosch, 26 September 1814 - Green Point, Cape Town, 22 October 1889) and Anna Marthina Neethling (Cape Town, 30 October 1822 - Green Point, Capetown, 28 April 1897) and attended the South African College. After matriculating he attended the University of Cape Town and obtained a BA Honours in 1882. With a scholarship to read law, he attended Downing College, Cambridge and graduated in 1885 with a Law Tripos. He won a scholarship in international and constitutional law at the Middle Temple and took the Bar in 1886.

== Career ==
He returned to South Africa and joined the Bar in the Cape Colony and the Transvaal Bar in 1887. He made his name as the lawyer for the Witwatersrand gold mine owners challenge of the patents for John Stewart MacArthur's MacArthur-Forrest cyanidation process. He won the case in 1896, with the patents declared invalid.

He defended the Lionel Phillips, Frank Rhodes, Sir George Farrar and John Hays Hammond at their treason trial in Pretoria in 1896 after the Jameson Raid failed. He also supported the Uitlanders cause but did not support the idea of war between Britain and the Transvaal Republic. During the Second Boer War he returned to Johannesburg in 1900 as legal advisor to Lord Roberts and later Lord Kitchener.

After the end of the Second Boer War, the government of the newly created British Colony of Transvaal established a Supreme Court of Transvaal in April 1902. The governor, Lord Milner, appointed Wessels as one of three puisne judges, with Sir James Rose Innes as Chief Justice. He was knighted in 1909. On the establishment of the Union of South Africa in 1910, he became a judge of the Transvaal Provincial Division. In 1920 he became the Judge President of the Transvaal Provincial Division and then elevated to the Appellate Division of the Supreme Court of South Africa in 1923. In 1932 he became its Chief Justice and the following year a member of the Privy Council.

== Marriage ==
Wessels married twice. Helen Duff in 1891 and after she died in 1925, married her sister Agnes in 1928.

== Family ==
Wessels' family had a farm in Green Point today known as Braemar Estate, and erected a burial vault on the farm known as the Woutersen Wessels Vault dating back to the 19th century. Wessels' brother, Adv. M L Wessels, and other family members are memorialised in the vault, which is today a protected heritage site.

Legal offices
| Preceded by Jacob de Villiers | Chief Justice of South Africa; 1932–1936 | Succeeded by John Curlewis |
