= Louw =

Louw is a surname that has pre-7th century Germanic origins. It is a Dutch/Flemish variant on the word Löwe, meaning Lion.

== People ==
=== Give name ===
- Louw de Graaf (1930–2020), Dutch politician
- Louw Venter (born 1975), South African actor and filmmaker
- Louw Wepener (1812–1865), Cape Colony Military
- John Louw Mouton (born 1994), Namibian politician

=== Surname ===
- Aimee Louw, Canadian disabled activist
- Antoinette Louw (born 1975), South African actress
- Andrew Louw (politician), South African politician
- Andrew Louw (cricketer) (born 1987), Namibian cricketer
- Boy Louw (1906–1988), South African rugby union player
- Dewald Louw (born 1986), South African singer
- Eric Louw (1890–1968), South African diplomat and politician
- Francois Louw (born 1985), South African rugby union player
- Gene Louw (1931–2015), South African politician
- Gretta Louw (born 1981), South African-Australian artist and curator
- Hanrie Louw (born 2001, South African field hockey player
- James Louw (born 1971), English cricketer
- Japie Louw (1867–1936), South African rugby union player
- Johann Louw (born 1979), South African cricketer
- Lennie Louw (born 1959), South African-born Namibian cricketer
- Miel Louw, Belgian journalist, television presenter, and writer
- N. P. van Wyk Louw (1906–1970), South African poet, playwright, and scholar
- Rob Louw (born 1955), South African rugby union player
  - Robbie Louw (born 1992), South African rugby union player (son of Rob Louw)
  - Roxy Louw (born 1987), South African model, actress, and surfer (daughter of Rob Louw)
- Rudi Louw (born 1985), Namibian footballer
- Stéfan Louw (born 1973), South African lyric tenor
- Stephan Louw (born 1975), Namibian long jumper
- Tiaan Louw (born 1988), Namibian cricketer
- W. E. G. Louw (1913–1980), South African poet
- Willem Louw (1920–1980), South African military commander
- Wynand Louw (born 1961), Namibian cricket umpire
