= 1955 in South Africa =

- Decades: 1930s; 1940s; 1950s; 1960s; 1970s
- See also: List of years in South Africa

The following lists events that happened during 1955 in South Africa.

== Incumbents ==
- Monarch: Queen Elizabeth II.
- Governor-General and High Commissioner for Southern Africa: Ernest George Jansen.
- Prime Minister: Johannes Gerhardus Strijdom.
- Chief Justice: Albert van der Sandt Centlivres.

== Events ==
January

- Mimi Coertse makes her debut as the First Flower girl in Parsifal at the Teatro San Carlo in Naples, with Karl Böhm conducting.

February

- 9 -- 2000 armed police men forcefully removed the black families of Sophiatown to the Meadowlands

March

- 4-5 – The Inaugural Conference of the South African Congress of Trade Unions (SACTU) is held at the Trades Hall in Johannesburg.
- 23 – The Meadowridge garden city opens near Cape Town.
- 25 – The Appeal Court bench increases from six to eleven members.

April

- 22 – The National Tea and Coffee Company is founded.

May

- 19 – The Black Sash, a non-violent white women's resistance organization, is founded by Jean Sinclair, Ruth Folley, Elizabeth McLaren, Tertia Pybus, Jean Bosazza and Helen Newton-Thompson.

June

- 20 – The Senate is enlarged from 48 to 89 members, giving the National Party a majority of 77.
- 25 – The Congress of the People, a multi-racial convention, starts in Kliptown, Soweto.
- 30 – The United Kingdom and South Africa sign the Simonstown Agreement for bilateral naval defence.

August

- 30 – Rondalia (a tourist club) is founded.

December

- 1 – The Voortrekker Covenant celebrations are held in Pietermaritzburg.
- 17-18 – The African National Congress' 44th Annual Conference is held in Bloemfontein.
- 18 – Lillian Masediba Ngoyi becomes a member of the Transvaal African National Congress' executive.

== Births ==
- 26 March – Rob Louw, rugby player, father of Robbie Louw & Roxy Louw
- 8 April – Gerrie Coetzee, 1983-1984 World Boxing Association heavyweight champion.
- 7 May
  - Shaleen Surtie-Richards, actress & TV host.
  - Mark Tovey, football player
- 10 May – Mbongeni Ngema, playwright and composer (d. 2023)
- 14 May – Peter Kirsten, cricketer.
- 1 June – Mbongeni Ngema, playwright, actor, writer, composer, screenwriter, musician, director and theatre producer. Most well known for creating Sarafina.
- 21 June – Gwede Mantashe, politician
- 5 July – Nana Coyote, musician.
- 17 July – Jomo Sono, former footballer, football coach & founder of Jomo Cosmos F.C.
- 25 July – Bantu Holomisa, founder & leader of the United Democratic Front (South Africa)
- 27 August – Pieter Groenewald, politician, leader of the Freedom Front Plus
- 23 September – Lulama Xingwana, politician.
- 2 October – Angie Motshekga, politician, national minister.
- 6 October – Schalk Burger (rugby union, born 1955), rugby player & father of rugby player Schalk Burger
- 25 October – Glynis Barber, South African-born British actress.
- 3 November – Phumzile Mlambo-Ngcuka, politician.
- 8 December – Ian Greig, South African-born English cricketer.

== Deaths ==
- 13 March – Benjamin Jennings Caddy, militant trade unionist. (b. 1881)

== Railways ==
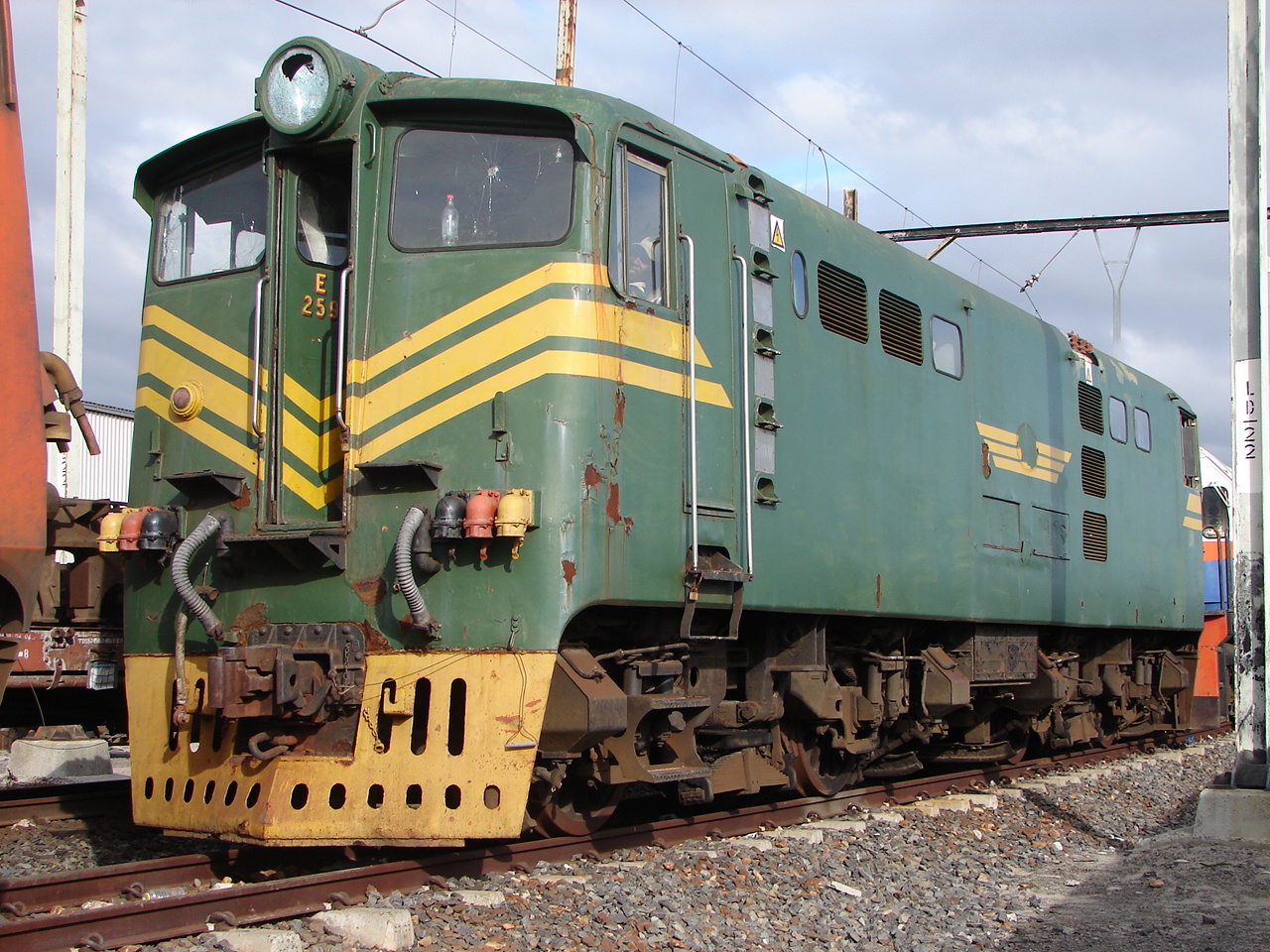
Class 5E, Series 1

=== Locomotives ===
- The South African Railways places the first of sixty Class 5E, Series 1 electric locomotives in mainline service. Designed by English Electric and built by Vulcan Foundry, it is the prototype of what would eventually become the most prolific locomotive type to ever run on South African rails.

== Sports ==
=== Football ===
The South Africa national football team tours Australia and plays five games against the Australia national association football team.

- 3 September – South Africa wins 3–0 at the Brisbane Cricket Grounds, Australia.
- 10 September – South Africa wins 2–0 at the Olympic Park, Melbourne, Australia.
- 18 September – South Africa wins 8–0 at the Kensington Oval, Adelaide, Australia.
- 24 September – South Africa wins 6–0 at the Sydney Cricket Ground, Australia.
- 1 October – South Africa wins 4–1 at the Newcastle's Sports Grounds, Australia.
