= Baskin =

Baskin may refer to:

== People ==
- April Baskin, American politician
- Bibi Baskin (born 1952), Irish radio & TV presenter, hotelier, and author
- Burt Baskin (1913–1967), American founder of an ice cream chain
- Carole Baskin (born 1961), American zookeeper and animal rights activist
- David Baskin, American neurosurgeon
- Eino Baskin (1929–2015), Estonian actor and theatre director
- Elya Baskin (born 1951), Latvian-born American actor
- Jeremy Baskin (born 1962), South African labour market analyst
- John Baskin, American television writer and producer
- Joseph Baskin (1880–1952), Belarusian-born labor activist
- Gershon Baskin (born 1956), Israeli peace activist
- Leonard Baskin (1922–2000), American sculptor and artist
- Monica Baskin, American psychologist
- Nora Raleigh Baskin (born 1961), American author
- Robert N. Baskin (1837–1918), American politician
- Roman Baskin (1954–2018), Estonian actor and director
- Theodore Baskin (born 1950), American musician
- Kathleen Baskin-Ball (1958–2008), American Methodist minister

== Other ==
- Baskin, Louisiana, United States, a village
- Baskin (film), a 2015 Turkish surreal horror film by director Can Evrenol

== See also ==
- Baskin-Robbins
- Baskin School of Engineering, University of California, Santa Cruz
- Basking (disambiguation)
- T.R. Baskin
