= 1956 in South Africa =

- Decades: 1930s; 1940s; 1950s; 1960s; 1970s
- See also: List of years in South Africa

The following lists events that happened during 1956 in South Africa.

== Incumbents ==
- [Queen of South Africa|Monarch]: Queen Elizabeth II.
- Governor-General and High Commissioner for Southern Africa: Ernest George Jansen.
- Prime Minister: Johannes Gerhardus Strijdom.
- Chief Justice: Albert van der Sandt Centlivres.

== Events ==
February

- 1 – The South African government severs diplomatic ties with the Soviet Union as a result of its support for the South African Communist Party.

March

- 16 – The Riotous Assemblies Act no. 17 is passed, prohibiting any outside gathering that the Minister of Justice deems a threat to public peace.
- 17 – Mimi Coertse makes her Vienna State Opera debut as Queen of the Night in The Magic Flute (Mozart).

August

- 9 – Women's march on the Union Buildings in Pretoria in protest against the pass laws.

December

- 5 – 156 leading activists are arrested, heralding the start of the Treason Trial. Among those arrested is Lillian Masediba Ngoyi.
- 19 – The Four year long Treason Trial begins at the Drill Hall in Johannesburg.

Unknown date

- Lillian Masediba Ngoyi is elected president of the Federation of South African Women.
- Lillian Masediba Ngoyi becomes the first woman to be elected to the African National Congress National Executive Committee.
- Segregation is introduced on buses.
- Albert Lutuli is arrested.

== Births ==
- 31 January – Trevor Manuel, politician.
- 2 February – Zweli Mkhize, politician, national minister
- 17 April – Jerry Mofokeng, actor.
- 29 May – Anant Singh, film producer, and businessman.
- 10 July – Solomon Mahlangu, Umkhonto we Sizwe operative
- 26 July – Gordon Igesund, football coach.
- 1 September – Jeremy Baskin, trade unionist and labour market analyst.
- 30 October – Nick Mallett, Springboks player & Springboks coach.
- 13 November – Nosiviwe Mapisa-Nqakula, politician, national minister
- 15 December – Tony Leon, politician.
- 16 December – Duncan Faure, musician, member of Rabbitt.
- 23 December – Andre Markgraaff, Springboks coach.

== Deaths ==
- 5 April - Manilal Gandhi, editor, activist, and second son of Mahatma Gandhi, (b. 1892)

== Sports ==
- South Africa at the 1956 Summer Olympics
