= 1952 in South Africa =

- Decades: 1930s; 1940s; 1950s; 1960s; 1970s
- See also: List of years in South Africa

The following lists events that happened during 1952 in South Africa.

== Incumbents ==
- Monarch: King George VI (until 6 February), Queen Elizabeth II (starting 6 February).
- Governor-General and High Commissioner for Southern Africa: Ernest George Jansen.
- Prime Minister: Daniel François Malan.
- Chief Justice: Albert van der Sandt Centlivres.

== Events ==
February

- 6 – King George VI dies and is succeeded Queen of South Africa by his daughter, Elizabeth II

March

- 23 – Ex-regent Mshiyeni, uncle of Zulu King Cyprian Bhekuzulu kaSolomon, warns the Zulu people not to participate in the Defiance Campaign. In the press the King repeatedly denies having any views on the matter.

April

- 6 – The African National Congress, South African Indian Congress and the Coloured People's Congress launch the Defiance Campaign against apartheid.
- 6 – The Van Riebeeck Festival is held in Cape Town, marking the 300th anniversary of the landing by Jan van Riebeeck at Table Bay.

May

- 3 – The first regular jet flight between South Africa and Britain is started with the arrival of a De Havilland Comet with 36 passengers at Johannesburg.

October

- 8 – A uranium plant operated by West Rand Consolidated Mines, the first in the world to extract uranium as a by-product of the gold refining process, opens at Millsite near Krugersdorp.
- 12 – The first uranium is worked at the West Rand plant.

Unknown date

- Nelson Mandela is given a 9-month suspended sentence and is forbidden to leave Johannesburg for the next 6 months.

== Births ==
- 23 January – Omar Henry, cricket administrator.
- 22 February – Bheki Cele, minister of police
- 26 February – Patrick Ntsoelengoe, soccer player. (d. 2006).
- 22 April – Nicholas Haysom, diplomat and anti-apartheid activist (d. 2026)
- 26 April – Popo Molefe, co-founder of the Azanian People's Organisation.
- 12 May – Membathisi Mdladlana, politician.
- 1 June – David Lan, director and playwright
- 26 June – Simon Mann, British Army officer, security expert and mercenary.
- 1 July – Dale Hayes, professional golfer.
- 29 July – Patrick Soon-Shiong, transplant surgeon, billionaire businessman, bioscientist, and media proprietor
- 2 September – Regardt van den Bergh, director, producer, writer and actor.
- 24 September – Kagiso Patrick Mautloa, artist.
- 23 October – Antjie Krog, poet, novelist, playwright and journalist.
- 27 October – Cyril Ramaphosa, President of the Republic of South Africa
- 1 December – Sonja Herholdt, singer.
- 14 December – Koos Bekker, billionaire businessman, and the chairman of media group Naspers.

== Deaths ==
- 28 March – Sir Fraser Russell, three times acting Governor of Southern Rhodesia. (b. 1876)

== Railways ==
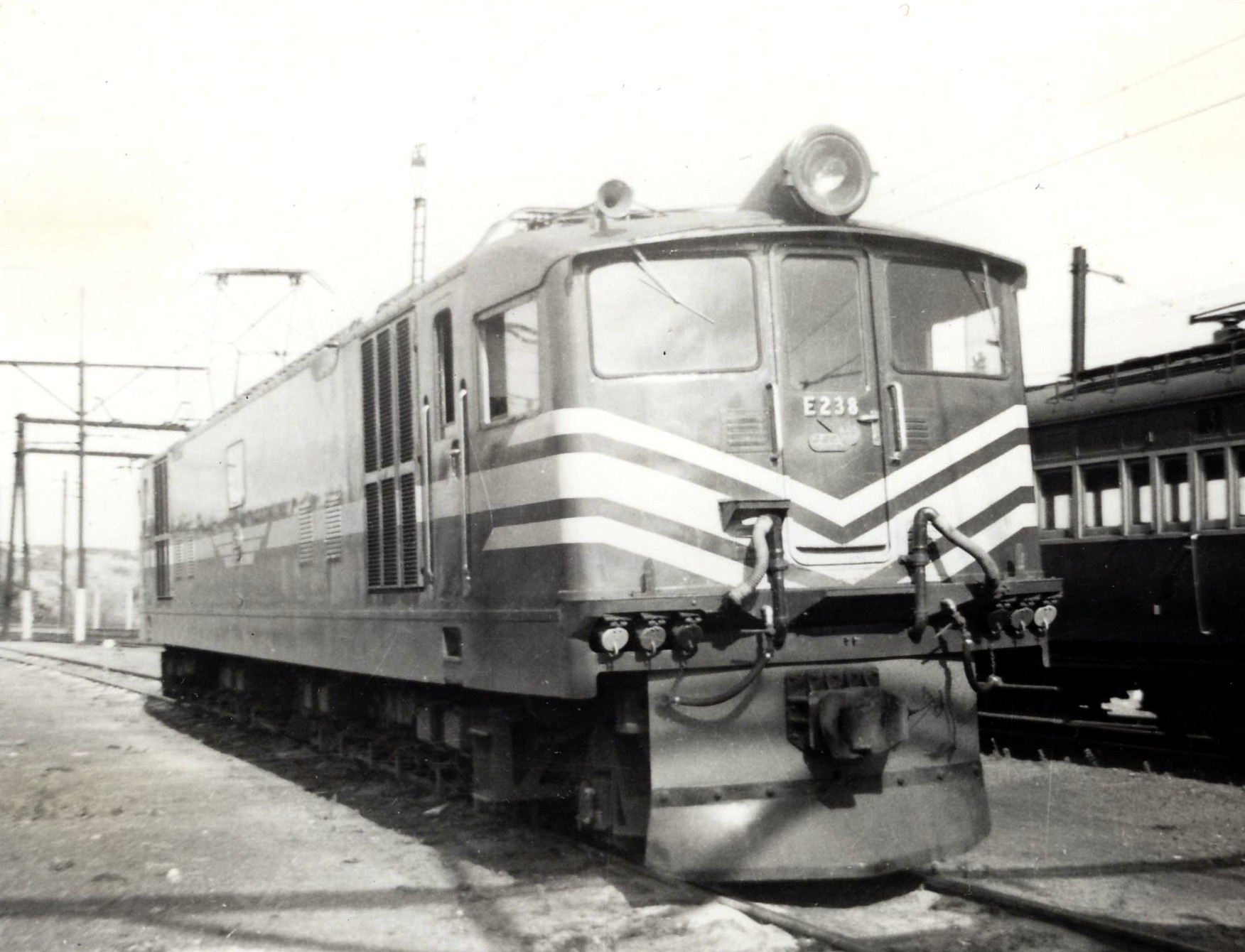
Class 4E

=== Railway lines opened ===
- 18 December – Free State: Odendaalsrus to Allanridge, 8 miles 63 chains (14.1 kilometres).

=== Locomotives ===
Two new Cape gauge locomotive types enter service on the South African Railways (SAR):

- The first of one hundred Class S2 0-8-0 shunting steam locomotives.
- The first of forty Class 4E electric locomotives, acquired to work the mainline from Cape Town across the Hex River Railpass to Touws River in the Karoo.
