= 1953 in South Africa =

- Decades: 1930s; 1940s; 1950s; 1960s; 1970s
- See also: List of years in South Africa

The following lists events that happened during 1953 in South Africa.

== Incumbents ==
- Monarch: Queen Elizabeth II.
- Governor-General and High Commissioner for Southern Africa: Ernest George Jansen.
- Prime Minister: Daniel François Malan.
- Chief Justice: Albert van der Sandt Centlivres.

== Events ==
May

- 9 – The Liberal Party of South Africa is formed in Cape Town by Alan Paton.

July

- 29 – Santam Insurance Company is registered, following the separation of trust and insurance operations.

September

- Mimi Coertse leaves South Africa for London.

December

- 18–20 – The 42nd Annual Conference of the African National Congress takes place in Queenstown.

Unknown date

- The Communist Party of South Africa (CPSA), banned by the National Party government, relaunches itself underground as the South African Communist Party (SACP).
- Bantu Education Act is voted, and will start 1 January 1954.

== Births ==
- 12 January – Steven De Groote, classical pianist. (d. 1989)
- 13 January – Derek Hanekom, activist and politician.
- 15 February – Mantfombi Dlamini, Queen Consort of the Zulu Nation. (d. 2021)
- 5 March – Tokyo Sexwale, businessman, politician and activist.
- 29 April – Bill Drummond, British musician
- 22 October – Loyiso Nongxa, mathematician.
- 7 December – Naledi Pandor, national minister

== Deaths ==
- 1 July – Totius, Afrikaans poet. (b. 1877)

== Railways ==
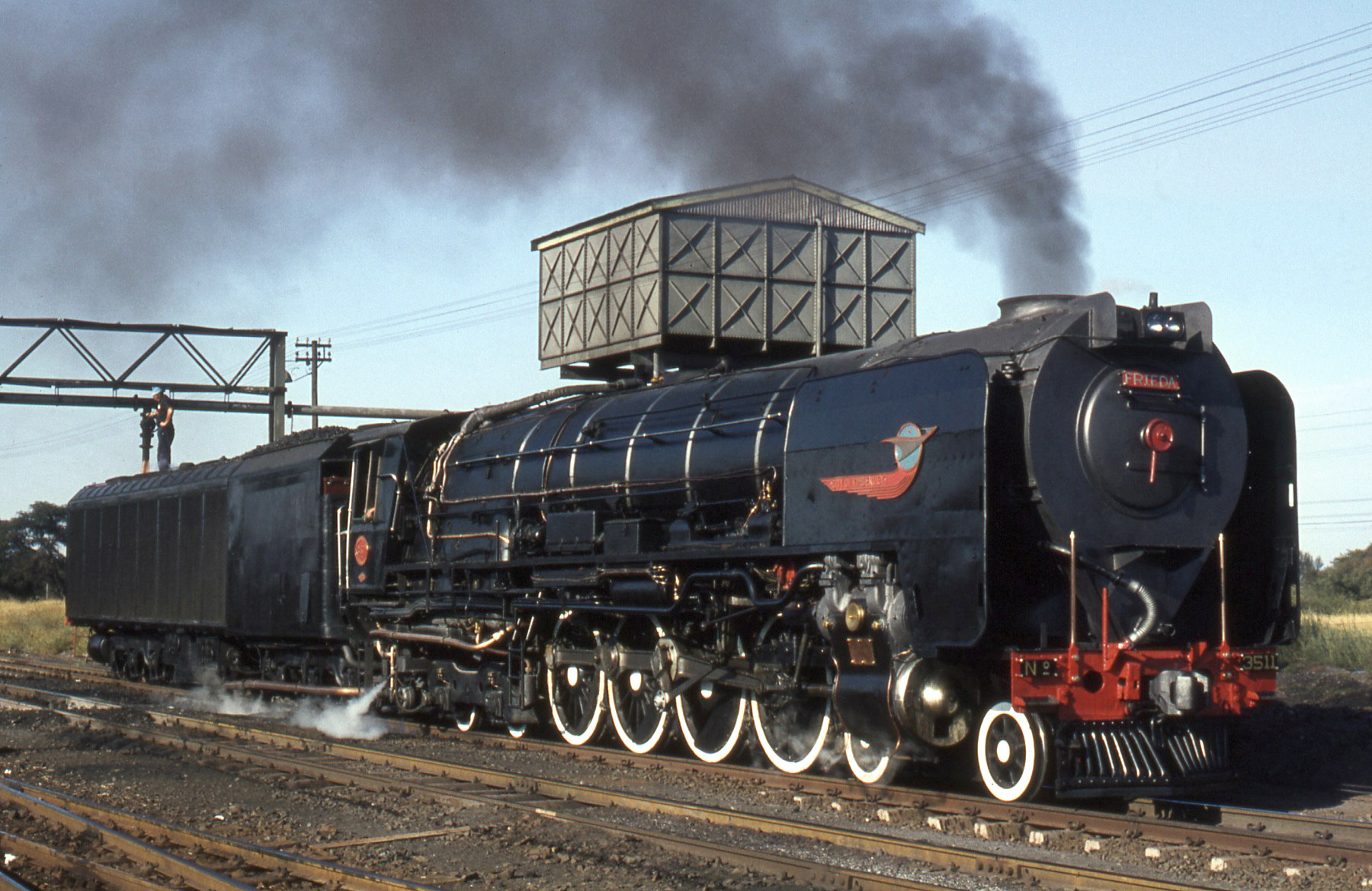
Class 25

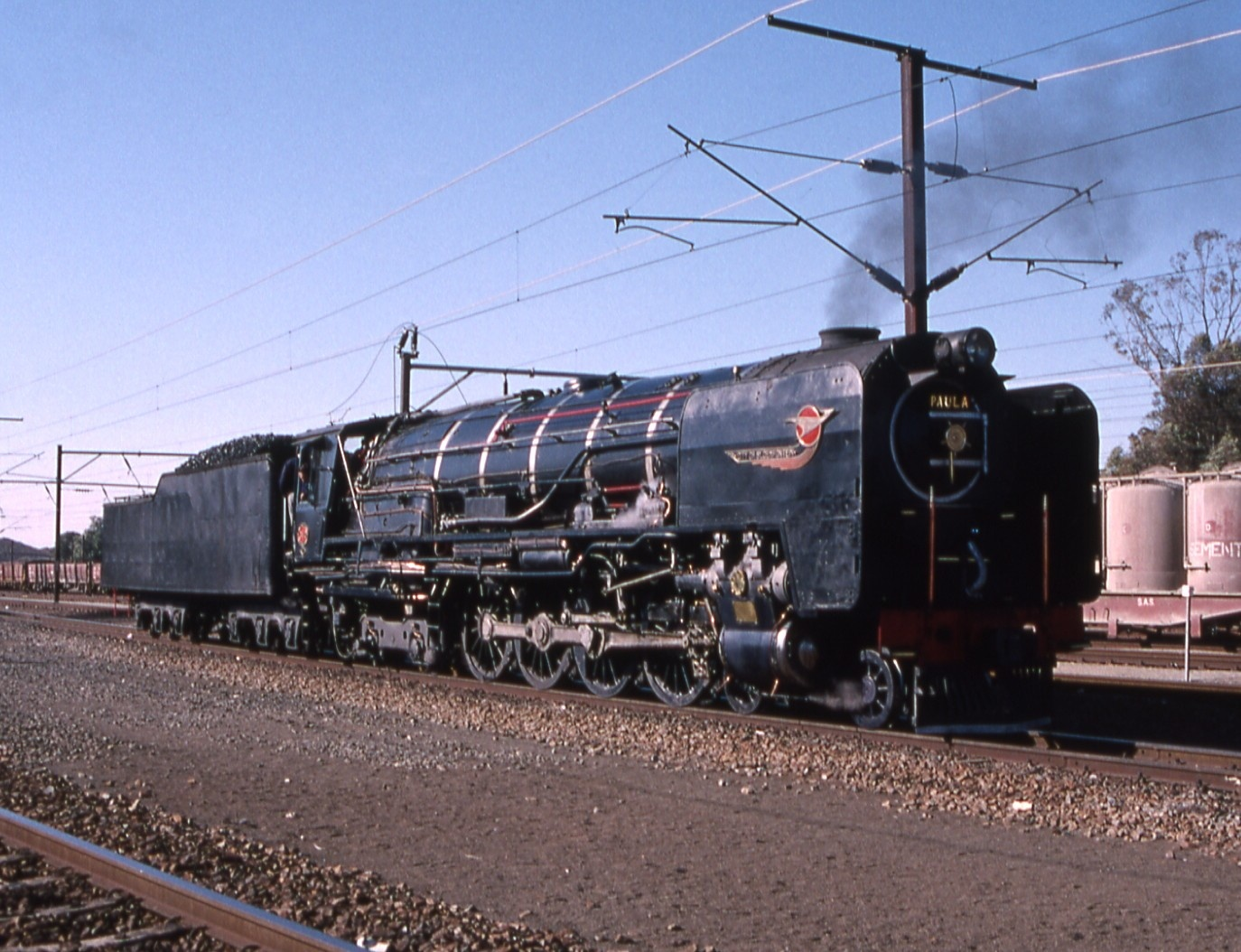
Class 25NC

=== Railway lines opened ===
- 14 October – Cape – Lohatla to Sishen, 17 miles 3 chains (27.4 kilometres).

=== Locomotives ===
Two new Cape gauge locomotive types enter service on the South African Railways (SAR):

- The first of ninety Class 25 4-8-4 Northern type condensing steam locomotives.
- The first of fifty Class 25NC non-condensing versions of the Class 25 Condenser.

== Sports ==
=== Football ===
- 22 November – In a friendly match the South Africa national football team loses 1–3 to the Portugal national football team at the National Stadium, Lisbon, Portugal.
