= 1954 in South Africa =

- Decades: 1930s; 1940s; 1950s; 1960s; 1970s
- See also: List of years in South Africa

The following lists events that happened during 1954 in South Africa.

== Incumbents ==
- Monarch: Queen Elizabeth II.
- Governor-General and High Commissioner for Southern Africa: Ernest George Jansen.
- Prime Minister: Daniel François Malan (until 30 November), Johannes Gerhardus Strijdom (starting 30 November).
- Chief Justice: Albert van der Sandt Centlivres.

== Events ==
January

- Mimi Coertse starts tutorship under Maria Hittorff and Josef Witt.

April

- 17 – The Federation of South African Women is launched in Johannesburg.
- 23 – The Afrikaans-German Culture Union (Afrikaanse-Deutsche Kultuurgemeinschaft - ADK) is founded in Pretoria.

June

- 23 – The Trust Bank of South Africa is founded by Jan S. Marais.

September

- 14 – Sasolburg is established near the Sasol plant in the northern Orange Free State.

October

- 10 – The much-travelled statue of Paul Kruger is unveiled in Church Square, Pretoria by Dr. D.F. Malan.
- 11 – Daniel François Malan announces his retirement.

November

- 30 – Johannes Gerhardus Strijdom becomes the 6th Prime Minister of South Africa.

December

- 16–19 – The 43rd Annual Conference of the African National Congress is held in Durban.

Unknown date

- George Bizos is admitted as a lawyer to the South African Bar.

== Births ==
- 13 January – Trevor Rabin, South African–American musician, founder member of Rabbitt.
- 2 May – Bulelani Ngcuka, first national director of the National Prosecuting Authority.
- 10 May – Lindiwe Sisulu, member of Parliament of South Africa, national minister.
- 10 June – Nelson Dladla, Teenage Dladla, soccer player.
- 23 August – Ngconde Balfour, politician.
- 23 September – Mavis Davies, Local Politician and longest serving Councilor in the history of Mtubatuba Local Municipality
- 12 October – Duma Ndlovu, filmmaker, poet, playwright. Well known for creating Muvhango & Uzalo TV shows.
- 5 November – Koos Kombuis, poet, singer, entertainer and writer.
- 26 November – John Matshikiza, actor, theatre director, poet and journalist. (d. 2008)
- 21 December – Gysie Pienaar, rugby player & father of rugby player Ruan Pienaar

== Railways ==
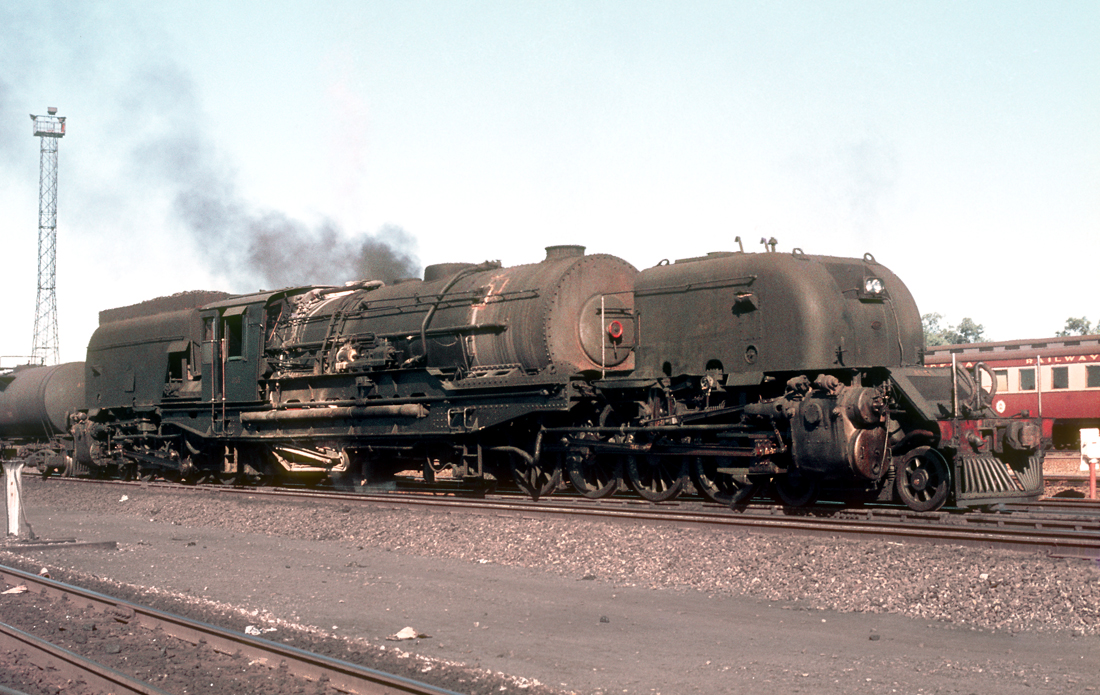
Class GMA

=== Locomotives ===
Two new Cape gauge steam locomotive types enter service on the South African Railways (SAR).

- The first of 120 Class GMA branch line and Class GMAM mainline 4-8-2+2-8-4 "Double Mountain" Garratt articulated locomotives.
- Twenty-five Class GO 4-8-2+2-8-4 "Double Mountain" light branch line Garratt locomotives.

== Sports ==
=== Football ===
- 1 May – The South Africa national football team beats the Israel national football team 2–1 at the Rand Stadium, Johannesburg in a friendly match.
