= Stéfan Louw =

South African operatic tenor

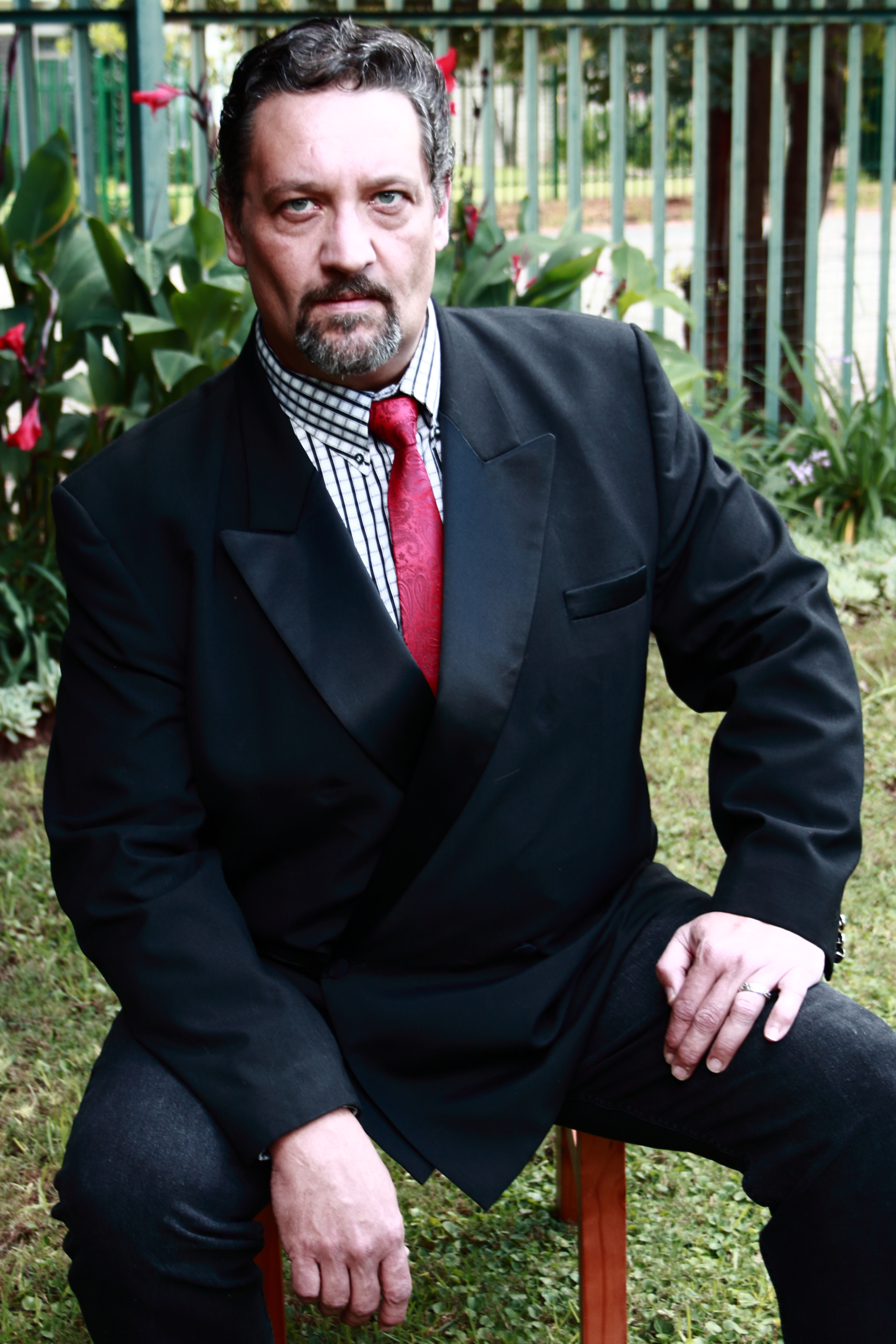
South African operatic tenor, Stéfan Louw (April 2025)

Stéfan Louw is a South African operatic tenor, regarded as one of South Africa's leading tenors. He has been performing opera since 1995.

== Early life and education ==
Stéfan Louw was born on 22 September 1973. He studied at the University of South Africa from 1988 to 1991 and later at the University of Pretoria from 1993 to 1995. His passion for opera began in his early years and was nurtured through extensive vocal training with renowned instructors such as Nellie du Toit and Emma Renzi.

== Career ==
Louw made his professional operatic debut in 1999 as Beppe in I Pagliacci at the Pretoria State Theatre. The role earned him the FNB Vita Opera Award for Most Promising Newcomer. He remained a member of the chorus until 2001, often performing supporting character roles. In 2000, he became one of the founding members of the Black Tie Ensemble (BTE). When Louw made his leading-role debut as Cavaradossi in Tosca (2003), he decided to quit his full-time job as a salesperson at Incredible Connection to focus on his opera career.

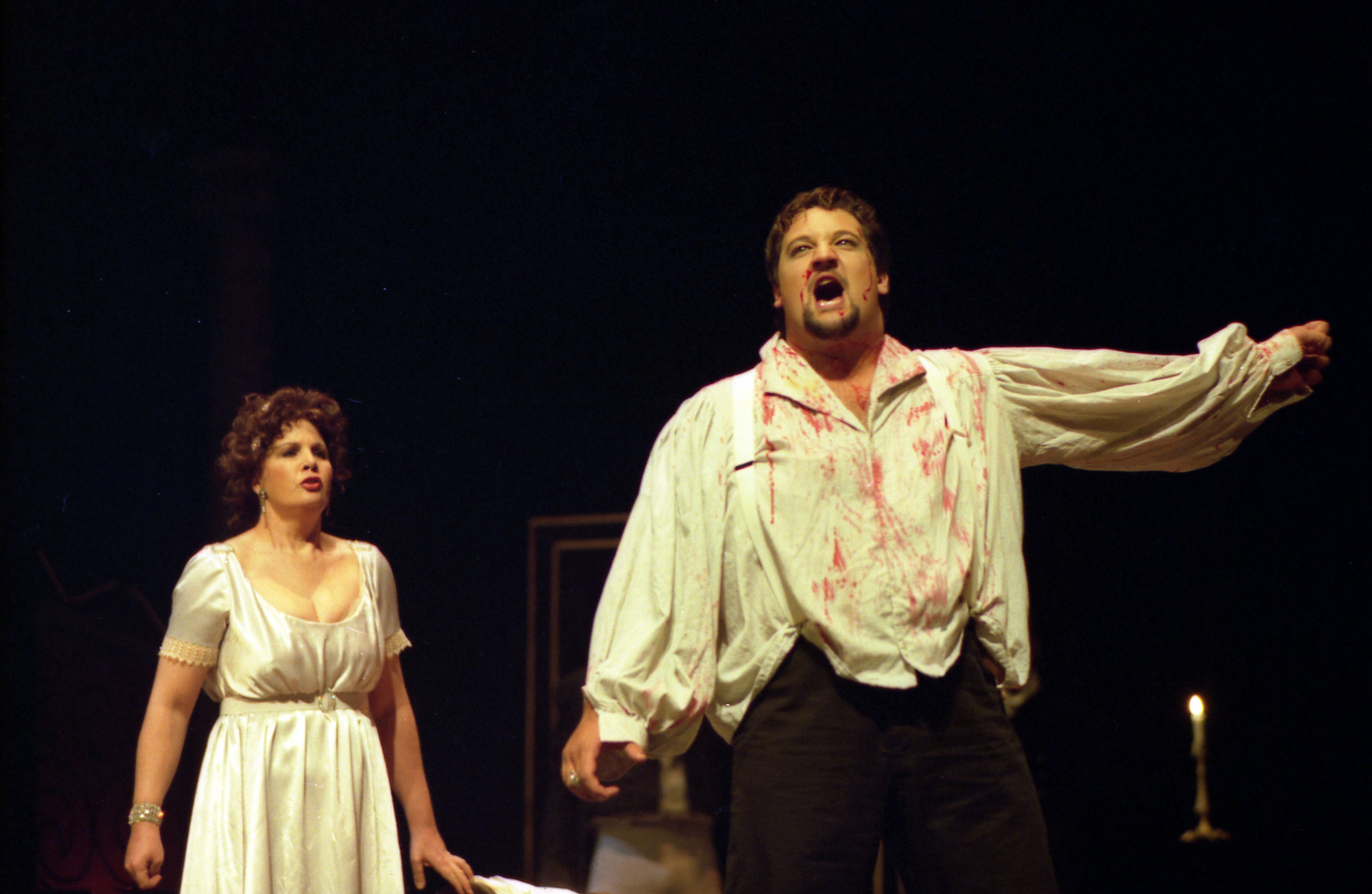
Louw as Cavaradossi in Tosca (2003)

Over the years, he built a distinguished career, performing lead tenor roles in productions such as Alfredo in La Traviata, Rodolfo in La Bohème, and Don José in Carmen. His performance as Rodolfo in 2005 was described by The Sunday Times as one delivered by a "national treasure".

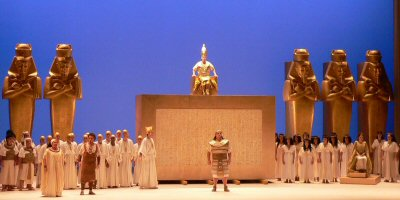
Stéfan Louw as Radames in Aida at the Opera de Dijon (2008)

Internationally, Louw debuted in 2008 at the Vichy Opera in France as Pollione in Norma. The same year, he portrayed Radames in Aida at the Opéra de Dijon. His versatility has also been showcased in performances of classical oratorios, including Messiah by Handel and Beethoven's Symphony No. 9.

Louw's artistry extended to opera direction with the establishment of Big Wig Opera in 2015, which produced several operas under his leadership, including Madama Butterfly and L’elisir d’amore.

In 2024, Louw ventured into crooning with the release of his third album, The Book of Elvis, an album featuring his renditions of Elvis Presley’s ballads. He released his second album, Lirico - A collection of lyric arias, in 2018.

== Notable Productions ==
Date	Opera	Composer	Role	Language	Director	Conductor	Producer
April 1999	I Pagliacci	Leoncavallo	Beppe	Italian	Michael Williams	Bruno Aprea	Pretoria State Theatre Opera
May 1999	Debut with Mimi	n/a	Tenor	n/a	Mimi Coertse	Christopher Dowdeswell	Mimi Coertse
August 1999	Turandot	Puccini	Pang	Italian	Angelo Gobbato	Gérard Korsten	Pretoria State Theatre Opera
May 2000	La Traviata	Verdi	Alfredo	Italian	Amanda van Zyl	Willem Vogel	Salon Music
December 2000	La Traviata	Verdi	Alfredo	Italian	Amanda van Zyl	Willem Vogel	Salon Music
May 2001	The Gypsy Baron	Strauss	Barinkay	English	Federico Freschi	Willem Vogel	Salon Music
July 2003	Tosca	Puccini	Cavaradossi	Italian	Emma Renzi	Weiss Doubell	Pro Musica Opera
April 2004	La Traviata	Verdi	Alfredo	Italian	Themi Venturas	Jeremy Silver	Opera Africa
July 2004	Madama Butterfly	Puccini	Pinkerton	Italian	Amanda van Zyl	Weiss Doubell	Pro Musica Opera
April 2005	Die Fledermaus	Strauss	Von Eisenstein	English	Steven Stead	Naum Rousine	The Durban Playhouse Company
July 2005	Rigoletto	Verdi	The Duke of Mantua	Italian	Steven Stead	Jeremy Silver	Opera Africa
September 2005	La Bohème	Puccini	Rodolfo	Italian	Hans van Heerden	Weiss Doubell	Pro Musica Opera
March 2006	Le Contes d'Hoffmann	Offenbach	Hoffmann	Italian	Ralph Lawson	Graham Scott	The Durban Playhouse Company
August 2006	A Tribute to Mario Lanza	n/a	Tenor	n/a	Neels Hansen	Graham Scott	The Black Tie Ensemble
October 2006	I Capuleti e I Montecchi	Bellini	Tebaldo	Italian	Laurence Dale	Jeremy Silver	Opera Africa
March 2008	Aïda	Verdi	Radames	Italian	Laurance Dale	Vincent de Kort	Opera Africa
September 2008	Norma	Bellini	Pollione	Italian	Charles Roubaud	Cyril Diederich	Opéra de Vichy
December 2008	Aïda	Verdi	Radames	Italian	Eric Perez	Alain Altinoglu	Opéra de Dijon
June 2009	Madama Butterfly	Puccini	Pinkerton	Italian	Christine Crouse	Francesco Bonnin	Cape Town Opera
April 2010	La Bohème	Puccini	Rodolfo	Italian	Themi Venturas	Timothy Myers	Opera Africa
June 2011	Opera Extravaganza	n/a	Tenor	n/a	Laurence Dale	Leslie Dunner	Opera Africa
October 2011	La Traviata	Verdi	Alfredo	Italian	Alessandro Talevi	Albert Horne	Cape Town Opera
October 2013	Symphony No 9	Beethoven	Tenor	English	Bongani Tembe	Justus Frantz	KZN Philharmonic Orchestra
April 2014	La Traviata	Verdi	Alfredo	Italian	Stéfan Louw	Doron Kanar	Stéfan Louw
April 2014	Messiah	Handel	Tenor	English	n/a	Naum Rousine	The Durban Playhouse Company
December 2014	Werther	Massenet	Werther	French	Stéfan Louw	Eugene Joubert (pianist)	Stéfan Louw
May 2015	La Bohème	Puccini	Rodolfo	Italian	Elizabeth Lombard	Graham Scott	Big Wig Opera
December 2017	La Traviata	Verdi	Alfredo	Italian	Stéfan Louw	Schalk van der Merwe	Stéfan Louw
June 2018	Carmen	Bizet	Don José	French	Daniel Verster	Schalk van der Merwe	Sempre Opera
November 2019	Petite messe solenelle	Rossini	Tenor	Latin	n/a	Leona Geldenhuys	University of the Free State
December 2019	La Traviata	Verdi	Alfredo	Italian	Stéfan Louw	Schalk van der Merwe	Stéfan Louw
March 2024	Messiah	Handel	Tenor	English	Ralph Lawson	Jeremy Silver	The Durban Playhouse Company
March 2025	Carmen	Bizet	Don José	French			Sempre Opera

== Opera entrepreneur ==
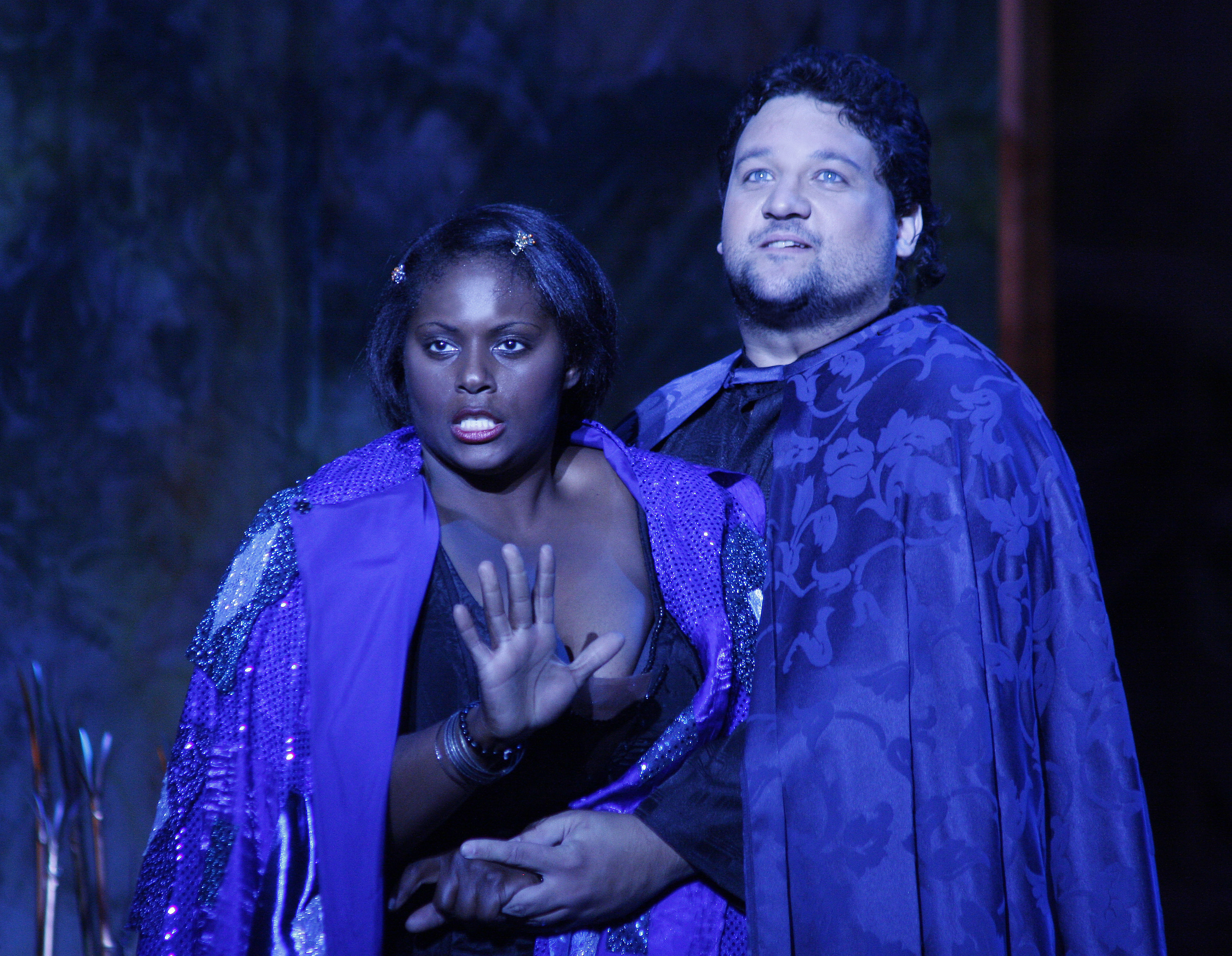
Louw as Radames in Aida (2008)

In 2003, Louw started producing small opera concerts at churches in-between professional productions. By 2010, his concert series Aria! Opera for Everyone was so popular that it ran for four seasons at the Roodepoort Theatre (2010–2014). These concerts aimed to bring true opera aficionados a measure of quality, whilst at the same time encouraging new audiences to appreciate true opera.

In March 2011, Louw founded his first opera company in Gauteng – Sempre Opera. In February 2013, he handed the reins to his colleague Linette van der Merwe (mezzo-soprano), who then took over as head of the organisation.

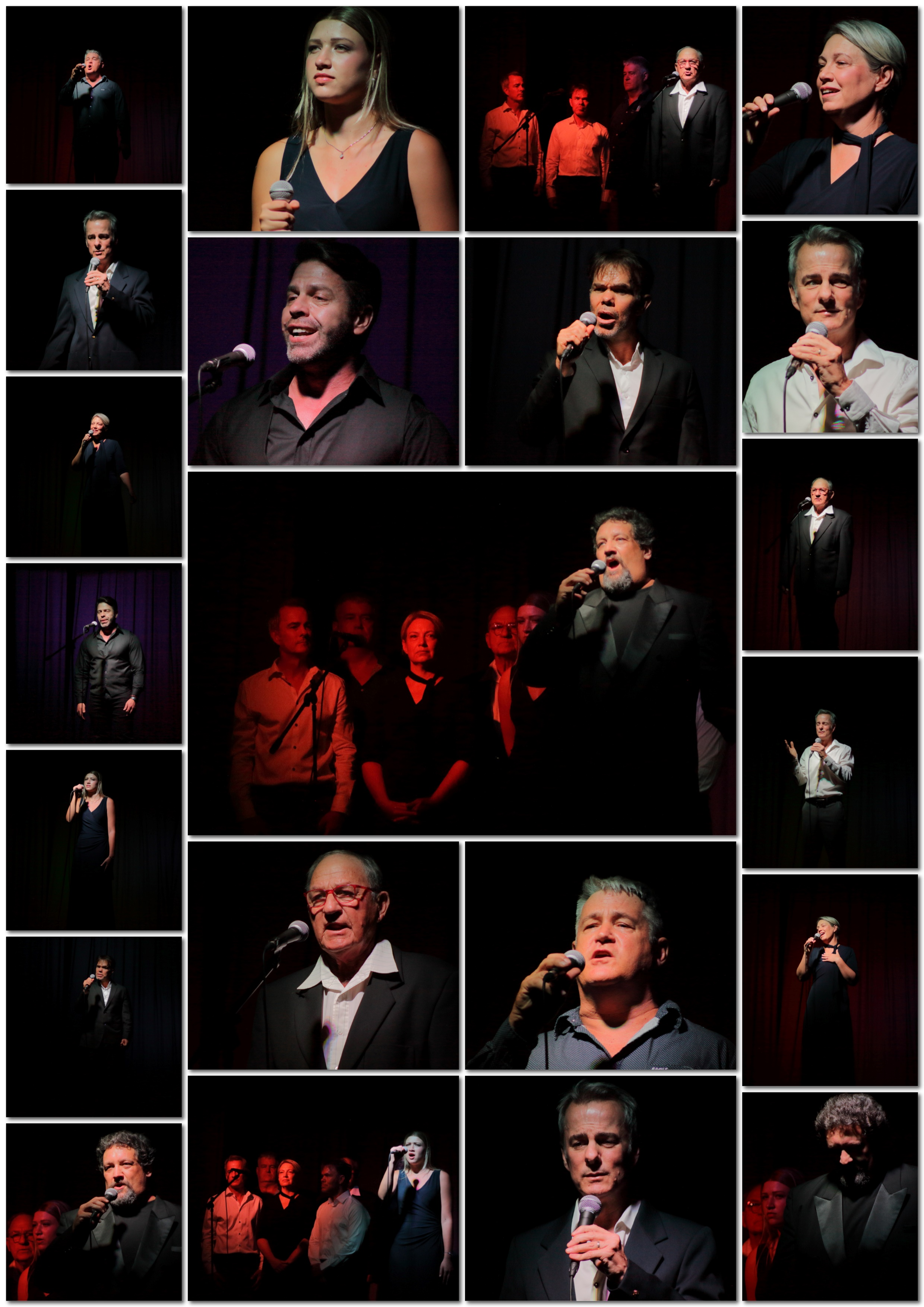
Students of the School of Singing during the 2024 Gala Concert.

Louw then formed a second opera company in Gauteng – Big Wig Opera. The company successfully produced three full operas – La Bohème, L'elisir d'amore and Madama Butterfly – in its first year of operations (2015) of which Louw performed in one and directed two. After spending a year singing in Greece during the 2017/18 season, Louw returned to South Africa and founded The Little Theatre Company, which is based in the Vaal Triangle.

=== Vocal coach ===
In 2019, Louw founded the Stéfan Louw School of Singing in Parys, South Africa, providing vocal training to students from diverse backgrounds. The school has become a cornerstone of the Parys music community, offering lessons in both English and Afrikaans and focusing on a variety of genres, from opera to jazz and gospel.

== Opera repertoire ==
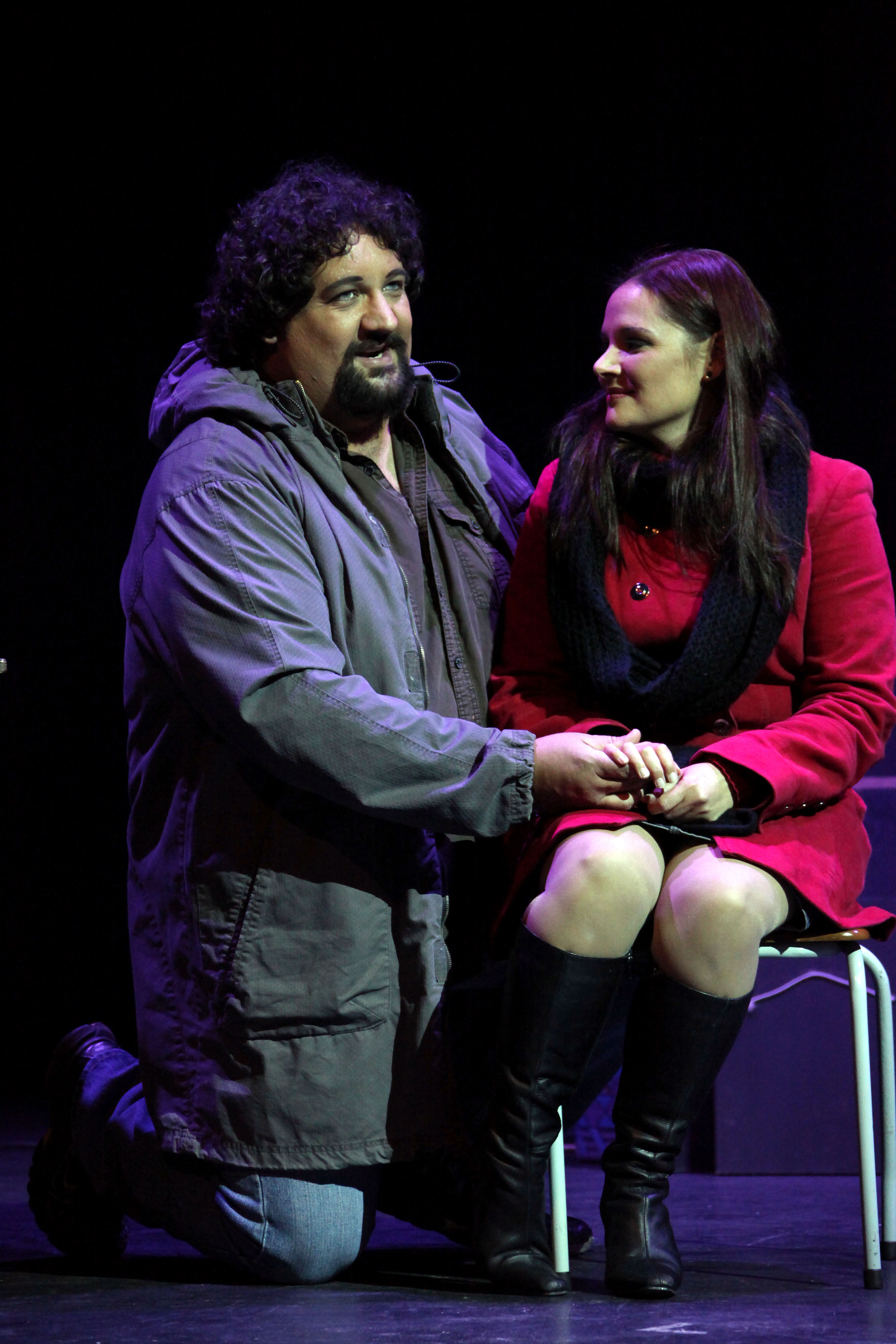
Louw as Rodolfo in La bohème (2015)

- Alfredo in La traviata
- Calaf in Turandot
- Canio in Pagliacci
- Cavaradossi in Tosca
- Don José in Carmen
- Hoffmann in Les contes d'Hoffmann
- Manrico in Il trovatore
- Otello in Otello
- Pinkerton in Madama Butterfly
- Pollione in Norma
- Radames in Aida
- Rodolfo in La bohème
- The Duke of Mantua in Rigoletto
- Tonio in La fille du régiment
- Von Eisenstein'in Die Fledermaus
- Werther in Werther

== Oratorio repertoire ==
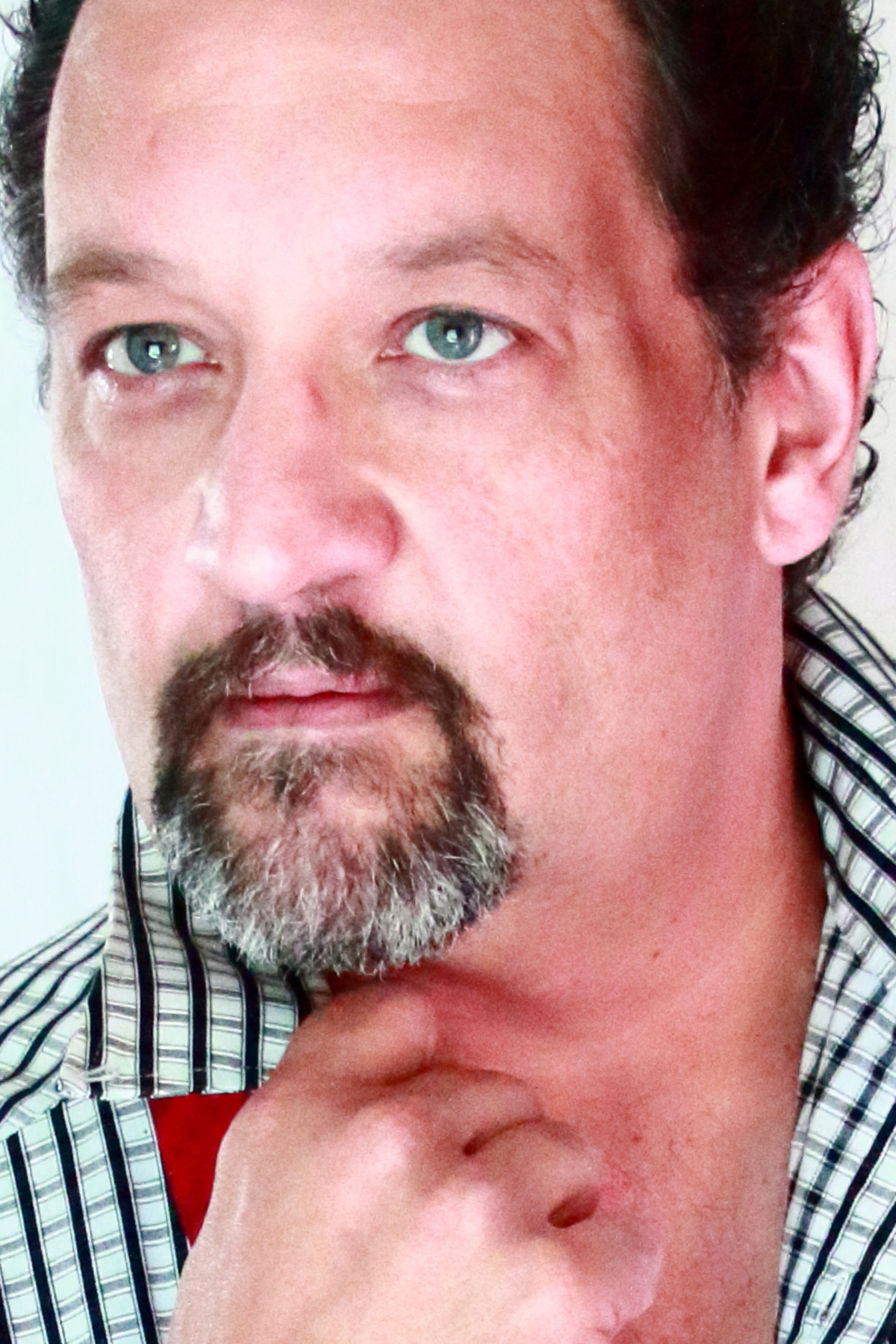
Stéfan Louw Operatic Tenor South Africa (April 2025)

- Puccini's Messa di Gloria
- Handel's Messiah
- Rossini's Stabat Mater
- Beethoven's Ninth Symphony
- Beethoven's Missa Solemnis
- Dvorak's Mass in D major
- Rossini's Petite messe solennelle
- Mahler's Das Lied von der Erde
- Verdi's Requiem

== Personal life ==
Louw met his wife, Marisa (Van Aswegen), in June 1996 when they were both members of the State Theatre Opera Chorus in the opera Tosca. They got married in Gordon's Bay on 20 February 1999.

In 2019, during the peak of Marisa's breast cancer treatment, Louw embarked on doing solo performances at private events to raise funds for her treatments. This period marked a turning point in his life, during which he embarked on producing small-scale productions and concerts which included house concerts at his home in Parys.

Beyond his professional endeavours, Louw enjoys playing PC games and recreational angling. Both he and Marisa are passionate animal lovers, sharing their home with Pekingese dogs, a Senegal parrot, an African Grey parrot, Budgerigars (commonly known as Budgies), and two pet mini-pigs.
