= Dawid Engela =

South African composer (1931–1967)

Dawid Sofius Engela (30 October 1931 – 25 November 1967) was a South African broadcaster, composer and musicologist.

== Early life ==
He was born in Florida, a suburb to the west of Johannesburg, Transvaal (now part of the province of Gauteng). He was the only child of David Jakobus Engela (1895–1962) and Sophia Hendrina Fredrika Engela (1903–1991, née Buys). His father was a teacher in the service of the Transvaal Education Department and, later, also a part-time lecturer in philosophy at the University of South Africa. His mother was an obstetric nurse and midwife.

His parents, both members of the Gereformeerde Kerk, brought him up to be highly religious, an important fact which was reflected in various compositions. His father was of an artistic nature and was a self-taught musician and painter, and Dawid was encouraged to learn the piano formally.

He took an early interest in African music and song and would attend Sunday afternoon church services in the African neighborhood to make closer acquaintance with the music of the people. This knowledge evidently contributed in later years to his decision to set two poems by Roy Campbell including The Zulu Girl to music; these poems describe typical Zulu characters.

In 1947 he matriculated from Voortrekker High School, Boksburg, with a first-class pass and distinctions in Latin, Mathematics, Physical Science and Music.

== University and early broadcast work ==
He registered in 1948 for a BA degree at Potchefstroom University. His subjects were Latin, Hebrew, Greek, Theology, Dutch and Afrikaans, and Music. He was also accompanist, soloist and pianist/conductor in the student orchestra. At this point Engela was aiming to enter the ministry, but soon realized that his future career lay in music. He nevertheless decided first to complete the year's study at Potchefstroom.

In 1949 he registered for a three-year B.Mus. degree at the University of the Witwatersrand. His tutors were Prof. P. R. Kirby, Dr. W Paff and Adolph Hallis.

Engela's long association with the broadcast media began on 1 December 1948, when he took a part-time job as an apprentice record program compiler in the SABC record library. He managed his time sufficiently well to pursue his full-time studies while having an income. In February 1950 he resigned from the SABC to pay more attention to his studies; nevertheless he handled the music column in the weekly SABC magazine, Radio, from June – August 1950. At the end of 1951 he completed his B.Mus. studies and immediately (in November) rejoined the SABC, this time as announcer/producer. He held this post until May 1953.

== Vienna ==
In May 1952 he met the young singer Mimi Coertse. They married on 25 July 1953. For this occasion he composed his so-called Wedding Cantata (Huwelikskantate). They wished to further their music studies in Vienna from January 1954, but first would undertake a tour of Europe. As a result they departed for London in September 1953 with individual two-year music bursaries of £25 per annum awarded by the Federasie van Afrikaanse Kultuurverenigings (FAK – Federation of Afrikaans Cultural Unions).

Engela's chief goal for his studies in Vienna was to achieve a doctorate in musicology. He registered at the University of Vienna, and began his research under Prof. Erich Schenk. This would deal with 'Harmony in the music of the early seventeenth century, with particular reference to the works of Monteverdi, Schütz and Schein'.

At the same time he registered at the Akademie für Musik und darstellende Kunst with a view to establishing himself generally as a musician. He took courses in piano accompaniment (with Alfred Uhl and later Karl Schiske) and composition and arrangement (with Hanns Jelinek and Paul Hindemith).

Full-time study proved to be difficult, however, with Engela having to take a number of part-time broadcasting jobs to make ends meet. During this period his marriage to Mimi failed, and he moved instead to London to try to get a permanent broadcasting job.

== London and the BBC ==
Engela's application for a permanent post at the BBC was successful and he was appointed from 1 September 1956 for a contract period of three years. Later it was extended and eventually he was in the service of the BBC for seven years, during which time he became a naturalised British citizen. Initially he worked in the Afrikaans Division and later in the Overseas Regional Service, as announcer, translator, programme compiler and drama organiser and producer, even occasionally doing duty as a sports commentator.

In September 1956 Engela registered as a student at the Royal College of Music. He resumed his interrupted studies, taking composition with Herbert Howells, music criticism with Frank Howes and piano with Henry Brown. In April 1958 he passed the ARCM Performance Diploma examination with distinction. In the same year he also passed the written examination for the D.Phil. degree in music history.

His plan was to complete his doctoral thesis within eighteen months. Its title was to be 'Periods of crisis in musical thought during the past millennium in Western civilisation and their relation to the present musical revolution'.

In 1958 he met the Scottish contralto, Ruth Morrison, whom he married in December of that year. From this marriage two children were born, Charl (1960) and Jeannie (1961). This marriage also failed, however, and was finally dissolved in January 1967.

In 1962 his father died. Engela and his family attended the funeral in South Africa. During this visit he wrote a children's book, Stories uit die Italiaanse Operas (Stories from the Italian Operas).

The London period was filled with rich musical experiences, including the radio interviews that he conducted with the composers Aaron Copland, Iain Hamilton, Humphrey Searle, John Joubert and others. The first public performances of his compositions date from this period. Well-known South African performers such as Joyce Barker, Betsy De La Porte and Dawie Couzyn were involved. He also organised the entire London production of Bartho Smit's play The Maimed. The performance by the English Stage Society took place on Sunday, 27 November 1960, at the Royal Court Theatre.

== Return to South Africa ==
At the end of August 1963 Engela left the BBC. During September the family moved to Cape Town where he took up the post of Music Organiser for the SABC on 1 October 1963. He held this post until February 1965 after which he began work as music manager of the Cape Performing Arts Board (CAPAB) in March 1965. He held this post until his death.

On 1 September 1967 he married for a third time, this time to a person without musical training – Ansie Fouché. He would not enjoy this marriage for long, however. On Saturday 25 November 1967 the couple left Cape Town for a short visit with his mother in Boksburg, before leaving on a long-planned overseas visit. Near Laingsburg Engela was killed instantly in a head-on collision with an oncoming car. His wife, who lost consciousness, died shortly afterwards.
