= James Louw =

English cricketer

Personal information
- Full name: James Haig Louw
- Born: 16 April 1971 (age 55); Dordrecht, Eastern Cape, South Africa
- Batting: Left-handed
- Role: Batsman

Domestic team information
- Years: Team
- 1999: Oxford University

Career statistics
Competition	First-class
Matches	7
Runs scored	183
Batting average	15.25
100s/50s	0/2
Top score	82
Catches/stumpings	5/–
- Source: CricketArchive, 27 February 2016

James Haig Louw (born 16 April 1971) is a former first-class cricketer who played for Oxford University during the 1999 season. He is currently a board director of Cricket Tasmania.

== Cricket career ==
Louw was educated at Keble College, Oxford, during which time he made seven first-class appearances for the Oxford University cricket team. His first recorded match was a non List A match against Glamorgan in April 1999. His first-class debut was in a 3-day match against Worcestershire, in which Louw bagged a pair (scored 0 in both innings). His highest first-class score of 82 came in a match against Essex at the County Cricket Ground, Chelmsford, although Louw scored 119 and 119 not out in each innings in a non first-class 3-day match against the Combined services team.

In September 2015, Louw was named a board director of Cricket Tasmania.
