= Johannesburg Trades Hall =

Building in Johannesburg

Coordinates: 26.20431°S 28.04225°E

Trades Hall
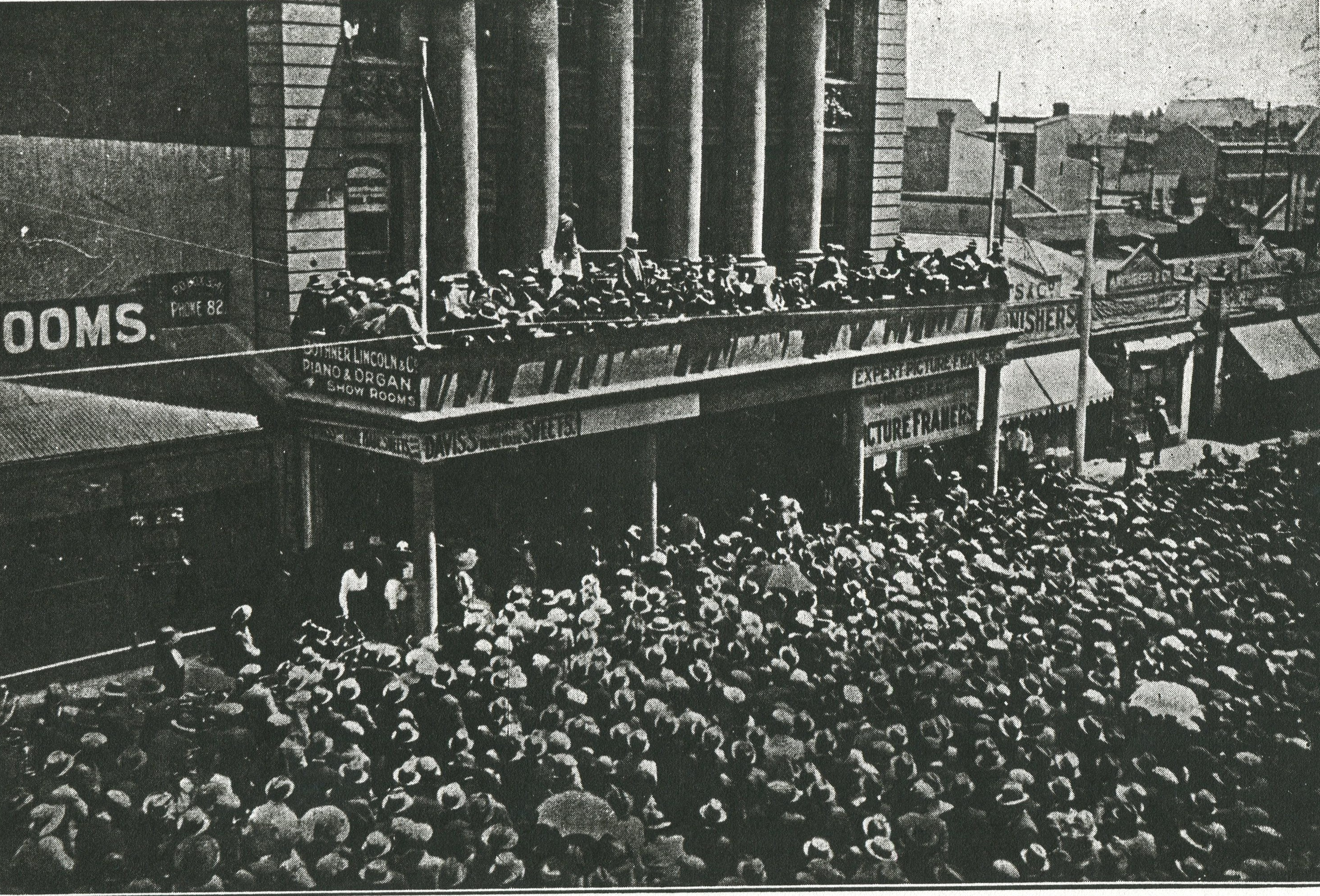
- Declaration of the strike in March 6, 1922

General information
- Status: Completed
- Location: Johannesburg, South Africa
- Completed: 1914

Height
- Roof: 102 metres (335 ft)

Technical details
- Floor count: 4

Design and construction
- Architect(s): Aburrow & Treeby

The Trades Hall is one of the oldest Edwardian buildings in the city of Johannesburg. Beyond its architectural importance, the building has historical significance as the previous headquarters of the Trade Unions. It is associated with many historical events such as the 1922 Rand Revolt. In 1986 it was listed as one of Johannesburg's 100 most important heritage buildings.

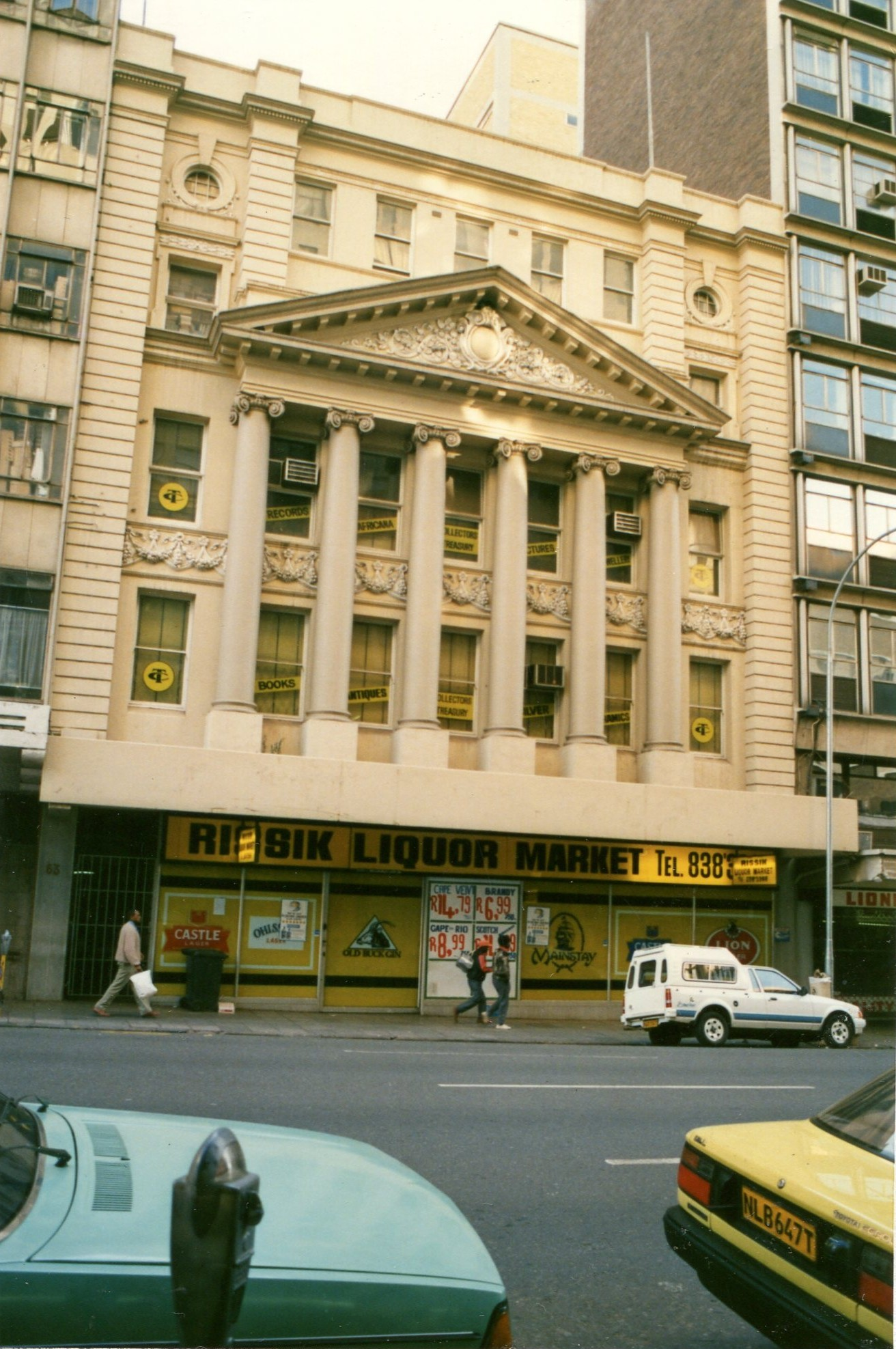
The Johannesburg Trades Hall in 1985
