= David Baskin =

American surgeon

David S. Baskin
- Education: Swarthmore College; Mount Sinai School of Medicine
- Medical career
- Field: Neurosurgery

David S. Baskin is a neurosurgeon who currently works at Houston Methodist Hospital as the vice chairman of its department of neurosurgery, the director of its residency training program, and the director of its Kenneth R. Peak Brain & Pituitary Tumor Center. He is also a professor of neurosurgery at Weill Cornell Medical College. Baskin has argued incorrectly that the vaccine preservative thiomersal is unsafe and there is a causal link between it and autism.

== Education ==
Baskin has a bachelor's degree from Swarthmore College, where he graduated with high honors, and a medical degree from Mount Sinai School of Medicine. He completed his residency in neurosurgery at the University of California, San Francisco.

== Career ==
Baskin taught neurological surgery at Baylor College of Medicine from 1984 until 2005. In 2011, he published a clinical trial in the Journal of Clinical Oncology regarding the efficacy of a type of gene therapy for malignant glioma, the most common form of brain tumor. This trial concluded that the therapy was safe and that the survival trends were "encouraging." He became the director of the Peak Center upon its establishment in 2013. In 2014, Baskin and his team conducted research regarding the use of nanosyringes to treat glioblastoma by filling them with anticancer drugs and releasing them into the bloodstream.

=== Pseudoscientific research and claims ===
In 2002, Baskin appeared before the United States House of Representatives' Committee on Government Reform. During the hearing, he stated that autism was worse than Alzheimer's disease, because, in his view, autistic children "never had a chance to enjoy life before they lost it." Baskin also labeled the thiomersal used as a vaccine preservative "poison" and claimed that ethylmercury (a component of thiomersal) was likely more neurotoxic than methylmercury. He also implied that there was a causal link between the addition of thiomersal to vaccines in the late 1930s and Leo Kanner's formal description of autism in the 1940s.

In 2003, Baskin co-authored a paper that claimed low-level exposure to thiomersal caused membrane and DNA damage, as well as caspase-3-dependent apoptosis, to human neurons and fibroblasts. In 2008, controversial nonprofit organization Autism Speaks awarded Baskin a grant to study cell proliferation in response to thiomersal exposure. In 2013, Baskin co-authored two papers in which he claimed B cells from autistic children were more sensitive to thiomersal and environmental toxins than cells from age- and sex-matched controls.

It is scientific consensus that there is no link between any vaccine or vaccine ingredient and autism and that the thiomersal used as a vaccine preservative is not harmful.

=== Awards and honors ===
Baskin has won the American Academy of Neurosurgery Award; the American College of Surgeons' Smith, Kline & French fellowship; the Wakeman Award for Research in the Neurosciences; and a distinguished alumni award from Mount Sinai School of Medicine. In 2000, he was elected to The Society of Neurological Surgeons.
