= Basking =

Basking may refer to:

- Basking in reflected glory, associating oneself with successful other such that their success becomes one's own
- Basking Ridge, New Jersey, unincorporated area in Bernards Township in the Somerset Hills region of Somerset County, New Jersey
- Basking Ridge (NJT station), New Jersey Transit station in Bernards Township, New Jersey
- Basking shark, Cetorhinus maximus, is the second largest living fish, after the whale shark
- Sunning (behaviour) or Basking behaviour used to raise body temperature, exhibited by some animals (see ectotherm)
