= Sonja Herholdt =

- Born: 1 December 1952 (age 73); Nigel, Gauteng, South Africa
- Origin: South Africa
- Genres: pop, adult contemporary
- Occupations: Singer-songwriter, actress
- Years active: 1976–present
- Labels: BMG Records, Marantha Records, Son Music

Sonja Herholdt (born 1 December 1952) is a South African singer-songwriter and Afrikaner actress.

== Personal life ==
Herholdt was born in the small Gauteng mining village of Nigel and at the age of three made her first singing performance at the local community recreation hall, singing the Afrikaans lullaby Slaap, my Kindjie.

She attended the Afrikaans-medium Tini Vorster Primary and Hoërskool John Vorster where she became Head Girl in both and followed her theatrical pursuits.

She later obtained a diploma cum laude in Teaching after three years at the Johannesburg (Goudstad) College of Education. She gave up teaching to pursue music after meeting her future husband, FC Hamman. The couple married in 1976 and started a family, their youngest son later developed an extreme hearing impairment in 1993. Herholdt subsequently decided to start a school for hearing and linguistically impaired Afrikaans children, this was housed in the pre-primary section of Bryanston Primary School. This resulted in Herholdt returning to teach for a period of time.

In 1996, Herholdt was involved in a serious car accident. She and her husband subsequently divorced after 21 years of marriage.

In collaboration with Carel Cronjé, she released her autobiography in 2007 Sonja: Meisie van Nigel. Later that year she was injured in a robbery on the way home from Cronjé's Johannesburg home.

== Career ==
Her breakthrough came when she did a spot on Gwynneth Ashley Robin's show and was soon asked to record Ek Verlang Na Jou. The single went gold in South Africa, selling over 25 000 copies.

Her subsequent albums and singles earned her similar critical and commercial success. She went on to win a total of eight Sarie awards. In the 1970s and 1980s, she was frequently the best-selling female artist in South Africa.

In 1979, she finally fulfilled her ambition to act by starring in Sing vir die Harlekyn, and winning a Rapport Oscar-Award as Best Female Newcomer.

She later enjoyed music success in Europe, she holds the distinction of being the first ever South African singer to be invited to perform in the Netherlands on their local Television. She recorded her song Oberammergau in Dutch. She also performed in Belgium, pushing Oberammergau into fifth place in the Belgian charts.

In 1989, she performed at the Religious Broadcasting Corporation in Washington, coinciding with the release of her gospel album, The Warrior is a Child.

In 1991, she received an award from the Afrikaans Chamber of Commerce for her services to Afrikaans music.

In 1995, she signed an album contract with BMG Records, enjoying success with the title track of her new BMG compilation, Skipskop. Her 1998 album Ritsel in die Rietbos did not meet critical and commercial expectations. But she rebounded with the critically acclaimed 2000 album, Reconstructing Alice.

In 2002 she developed her own record company, Son Music and released Sonjare, a nostalgic retrospective of her original hits.

== Discography ==
Herholdt has recorded several albums and singles since the 1970s;

Albums

- Sonja (1976)
- Sonja Herholdt (1977)
- On stage/In die kalklig (1978)
- Waterblommetjies (1978)
- 'n Lied vir Kersfees (1979)
- Harlekyn (Gold) (1979)
- Grootste Treffers (1980)
- Waarom Daarom (1981)
- Reflections (1982)
- Liefdeslig (1984)
- Lofsang – Sonja Herholdt en Jan de Wet (1985)
- Dis net vir jou (1987)
- Sonja Herholdt sing die Jeugsangbundel (1987)
- Sonja Herholdt sing die Jeugsangbundel 2 (1988)
- Tuiskoms (1988)
- Die Klokkespel 'Vrede (1989)
- The Warrior is a Child (1989)
- 'n Ster Vanaand (1994)
- Tuiskoms (1995)
- More sal die son weer skyn (1996)
- Ritsel in die Rietbos (1998)
- Reconstructing Alice (2000)
- Sonjare
- 20 Gunsteling treffers
- Dis Kersfees
- Sonja Herholdt Skipskop
- Die mense wat ek liefhet*Gunsteling treffers (1992)
- Sê die engele moet kyk na my (1994)
- Die verhale van vrouwees
- She
- She The Princess
- Liefling die movie
- Pêrels

== Awards ==
Year	Category	Awards body	Result
1991	Erkentlikheidstoekening	Afrikaanse Sakekamer (Afrikaans Chamber of Commerce)	Winner
1980	Rapport Oscar, Beste Nuweling Aktrise (Best Female Newcomer)	Rapport	Winner
1980	Beste Langspeler van die Jaar (Best Album)	SAMA	Winner
1976	Beste Langspeler van die jaar (Best Album)	SAMA	Winner
1975–80	Beste Sangeres van die Jaar (Best Female Singer)	SAMA	Winner
	Junior Rapportryers-toekening	Junior Rapportryers	Winner
	Rising Star Award	Papillon	Winner
	Lifetime Award	Skouspel 2010	
	Lifetime Award	Tempo Toekennings 2010	
