= Jeremy Baskin =

South African economist

Jeremy Baskin is a specialist in sustainable business practice. He is a director of the University of Cambridge's Programme for Industry, running a global programme on Business & Poverty and a range of other programmes in Australia. Baskin is also a South African labour market analyst.

Baskin became involved as a trade unionist in the militant black unions of South Africa in the 1970s and worked his way up to general secretary of the Congress of South African Trade Unions' Paper, Printing, Wood and Allied Workers' Union. He was also an executive member of COSATU.

In 1991, he wrote Striking Back, a history of COSATU. It covered the period from 1985 until the release of Nelson Mandela in 1990. In 1994, he became the director of COSATU's think-tank, the National Labour and Economic Development Institute (Naledi) and in 1998, after a stint as a senior public servant, he was appointed advisor to the South Africa's Minister of Labour.

In September 2001, Baskin moved to London and joined the Ethical Investment Research Service (EIRIS) as global head of research. In 2005 he joined the University of Cambridge, becoming the Director of CPSL Australia.
