= Roxy Louw =

South African model

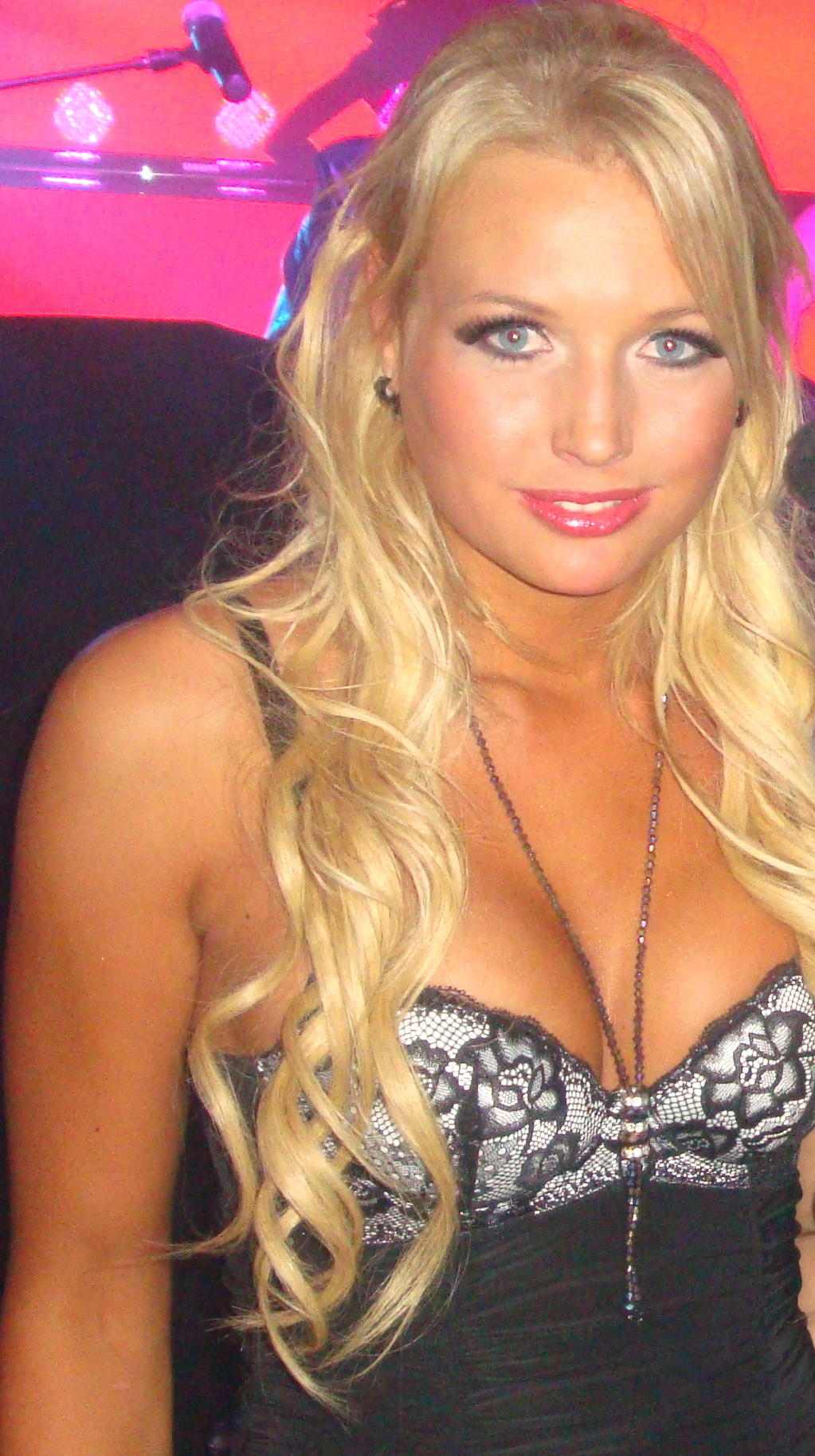
- Louw in May 2010
- Born: Roxanne Louw; 9 June 1987 (age 38); Cape Town, South Africa
- Education: Stellenberg High School
- Occupations: DJ, model, and actress
- Height: 5 ft 9 in (1.75 m)
- Spouse: Sam Barton (m. 2020)
- Relatives: Rob Louw (father), Robbie Louw (brother)
- Website: www.roxylouw.com

Roxy Louw (born Roxanne Louw on 9 June 1987 in Cape Town, South Africa) is a South African DJ, model, actress, and surfer. She has modelled for Sports Illustrated, Renault, Woolworths, Kauai, Vodacom, and Nashua Mobile, and has been featured by FHM. She has also acted in films such as Blue Crush 2 and The Perfect Wave. Louw was the international face of Oakley in 2005. She has also recently been cast in Tropika Island of Treasure All Stars (season 10), which is scheduled to be released in late 2022.

== Early life ==
Roxanne Louw was born on 9 June 1987 to rugby player Rob Louw and Azille Louw in Cape Town, South Africa. She grew up on a small holding in Durbanville, a rural residential suburb of the greater Cape Town metropolis. Louw attended Durbanville Primary School and Stellenberg High School. At Stellenberg High School, she played provincial hockey.

== Career ==
At the age of 17, Roxy Louw was signed as a team rider with Oakley America by Seth Hulley when he noticed her surfing skills. She went on to become the international face of Oakley. As a professional surfer, she has advocated for equal pay for female surfers and has spoken out against online sexual harassment.

In addition to being a surfer, Roxy Louw is also a professional model. She has modelled for Sports Illustrated, Renault, Woolworths, Kauai, Vodacom, and Nashua Mobile, and has been featured by FHM. She was also the face of Oakley's 2005–2010 international advertising campaign.

In 2012, Louw launched a limited edition car in her name with Renault South Africa.

She is also a registered Yoga teacher with Yoga Alliance.

Louw married Sam Barton, a former New Zealand rugby player, on February 4, 2020.

In 2022, Louw established the fashion brand KAAL. She became an ambassador for the Princess Charlene of Monaco Foundation in 2024.

== Personal life ==
Roxy Louw has two sisters, Mystique and Shahnee, as well as a brother called Robbie. She is fluent in both English and Afrikaans.

Roxy Louw is currently married to Sam Barton, a former New Zealand rugby player.

== Selected filmography ==
- Blue Crush 2 (2011)
- The Perfect Wave (2014)

== See also ==
- Rob Louw (father)
- Robbie Louw (brother)
- Sam Barton (partner)
