= Robbie Louw =

South African rugby union player

- Full name: Robert Mathew Mark Louw
- Born: 19 November 1992 (age 33) Cape Town, South Africa
- Height: 1.88 m (6 ft 2 in)
- Weight: 95 kg (209 lb; 14 st 13 lb)
- School: Paul Roos Gymnasium, Stellenbosch
- Notable relative(s): Rob Louw (father), Roxy Louw (sister)

Rugby union career
- Position: Centre
Youth career
- 2012–2013: Western Province
Senior career
Years	Team	Apps	(Points)
2016	Boland Cavaliers	4	(10)
- Correct as of 4 September 2018

Robbie Louw (born Robert Mathew Mark Louw on 19 November 1992) is a South African rugby union player who played first class rugby for the Boland Cavaliers in 2016. He made one appearance in the Currie Cup qualifiers and three appearances in the Currie Cup Premier Division. His regular position is centre.

== Family ==
He is the son of Rob Louw, a rugby player that played rugby union and rugby league in the last 1970s and early 1980s, making 19 test appearances for the South Africa national team. He also has three sisters, Roxy, Mystique, and Shahnee.
