= Rob Louw =

South Africa international rugby union & league player

- Born: Robert James Louw; 26 March 1955 (age 71) Cape Town, Union of South Africa
- Height: 1.89 m (6 ft 2 in)
- Weight: 91 kg (14 st 5 lb)
- School: Wynberg Boys' High School
- University: Stellenbosch University

Rugby union career
- Position: Flanker or Number eight
Amateur team(s)
Years	Team	Apps	(Points)
- Stellenbosch University
–	Defence RFC		
–	Gardens–Tech RFC		
Senior career
Years	Team	Apps	(Points)
1980–1985	L'Aquila		
Provincial / State sides
Years	Team	Apps	(Points)
1978–1985	Western Province	81	(72)
International career
Years	Team	Apps	(Points)
1980–1984	South Africa	19	(20)
National sevens team
Years	Team		Comps
2002	South Africa 7s (manager)		1
Coaching career
- Years: Team
- –: Rugby Roma
- 1994: Hamilton RFC
- Rugby league career

Playing information
- Position: Loose forward
Club
Years	Team	Pld	T	G	FG	P
1985–87	Wigan					8

Robert James Louw (born 26 March 1955) is a South African rugby footballer who represented South Africa 19 times in international test rugby union. He also played in the Western Province teams that won the Currie Cup five consecutive times. South African rugby chief Danie Craven rated Louw as "one of the best Springboks ever to represent South Africa", "fast enough to play among the backs", and a "superb ambassador for South Africa" due to "his friendly manner and attractive personality". Louw was nominated as South African Rugby Player of the Year in 1979 and in 1984.

== Background ==
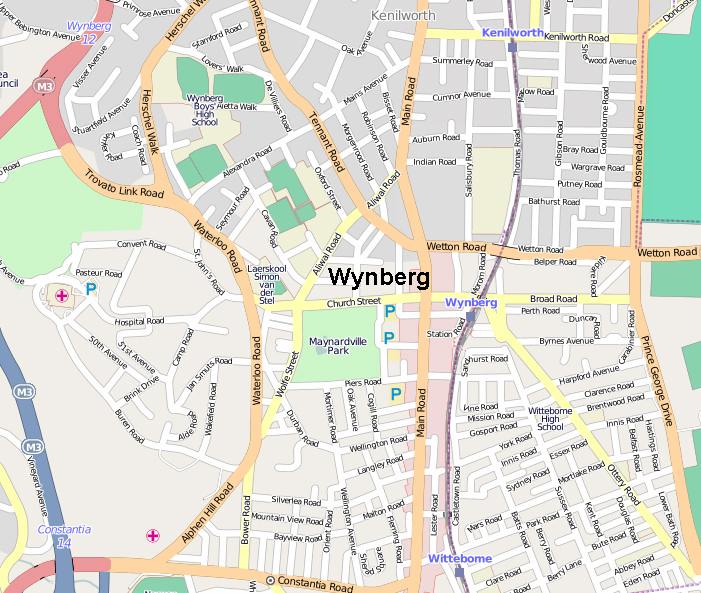
A map of Wynberg, where Louw was born, showing Wynberg Boys' High School at the top left.

Rob Louw was born in Wynberg, Cape Town on 26 March 1955 to one of the oldest families of Western descent in South Africa. He has two brothers, Mark and Michael. His ancestor Jan Pieterz Louw (1628–91) moved in 1658 from Caspel ter Maere in the Netherlands to the way-station at the Cape of Good Hope that the Dutch East India Company had established in 1652 (present-day Cape Town). His grandfather, Matthys Michiel Louw (b. 1855), was a nurse at the leper colony established in 1845 on Robben Island, before its transition to a prison. Rob's father, Matthew Michael (Matt) Louw, was born on the island in 1922, and served in the South African Air Force's 30 Squadron in Cairo during World War II. Matt was stationed in Italy for a while, as well as at the military installation on Robben Island in the 1940s, as a radio telegraphist. As a young man Matt had played rugby until a knee injury in 1954 ended his playing career. Due to his love of the game, Matt became a referee, a role in which he continued until he was in his 70s.

== Early life ==
Louw received his secondary education at Wynberg Boys' High School and his tertiary education at Stellenbosch University. The Springbok fast bowler Garth le Roux was one of his school mates. Louw joined the South African Navy, where he was Sportsman of the Year for two consecutive years.

== Early career ==
Louw gained provincial selection to Western Province's 1972–1973 school teams for Craven Week. In 1975 he was selected for a South African under-21 team that included Gysie Pienaar, Divan Serfontein, and Schalk Burger Sr.

As a student he regularly represented his university, which has the most rugby teams of any club in South Africa. At the 1979 Toyota annual national club rugby tournament, Louw scored five tries in Maties' game against Pukke, who lost 9-97. By 1990 Louw's feat still stood as the record for most tries scored by a player during the tournament. The Stellenbosch team set several other records in this 1979 encounter: most points in a match, most tries in a game (16), and the largest win margin. They not only won the 1979 tournament, but set records for most tries in the tournament (26) and most points in the competition (165). Stellenbosch beat Tukkies 27–11 in the final to emerge overall champions.

Louw played 81 times for Western Province's senior team from 1978 to 1985, appearing in six Currie Cup Finals winning three. During Province's centenary year celebrations in 1983 he played for his home team on 31 May against a Rest of South Africa team. At the time his home club was given as Defence.

He scored a try in Province's 1984 Currie Cup Final victory of 19–9 over Natal.

== International career ==
Louw made his test début at the New Wanderers Ground in Johannesburg against a South American team on 26 April 1980. Captained by Morné du Plessis, the South Africans beat their opponents by 24–9 before a crowd of 34,000. Appropriately enough, he finished his test career just over four years later with a match on 27 October 1984 against South America and Spain at Cape Town. The increasing pressure from internal and international opposition to apartheid had rung the death knell for international competition by South Africa's sports teams. Louw had played in 28 Springbok matches, of which 19 were tests; the most notable were probably the 1980 series in South Africa against the British and Irish Lions, and the 1981 tour to New Zealand and the USA.

=== British and Irish Lions tour, 1980 ===
Louw was selected for all four of South Africa's tests against the touring British and Irish Lions, and scored in each of the first two matches. His first test try came on 31 May at Newlands Stadium, his home ground. Gysie Pienaar had chipped and gathered the ball for a storming run down the right-side of the field before passing to Louw on his inside. Louw evaded a hapless John Carleton with an inside swerve, and scored from 25 metres out, despite the attempts of Lions' wing Mike Slemen. He drove for the try-line with full-back Rodney O'Donnell on his back for the last six metres, and scored before an ecstatic crowd of 40,000.

In the second test match at the Free State Stadium in Bloemfontein on 14 June, Louw scored in the 12th minute of the game. Wing Gerrie Germishuys had intercepted a cross-field kick by the Lions' Andy Irvine and sprinted down the left-side of the field, wrong-footing a retreating John Carleton with an outside-inside swerve. Germishuys passed to Louw, who gave the ball to Willie du Plessis upon being tackled himself. Louw jumped up and ran himself into position on Du Plessis' inside to take his second pass. The cross-cover defense of Ray Gravell arrived too late to stop Louw's try in the corner. Before the match The Glasgow Herald had noted the pace of Louw, matched with that of Du Plessis, gave the Springboks "a marked superiority".

=== New Zealand tour, 1981 ===
The Springbok tour to New Zealand met a barrage of protests against the policy of apartheid. Protesters opposed the tour as part of an international anti-apartheid movement that believed in denying economic, sporting and cultural contact with South Africa. The movement wanted to isolate the South African government and force it to negotiate with the liberation movements, particularly the African National Congress.

On the tour, Louw shared a room with coloured flyhalf Errol Tobias. In an interview reported in The Sydney Morning Herald, Louw claimed that black and coloured players were proud of the Springboks and that rugby had created a sense of unity among South Africans. Due to his friendship with Tobias, Louw was not well-regarded by team manager Johan Claassen and coach Nelie Smith. Reflecting on the tour 15 years later, former Springbok flank Boland Coetzee praised Louw and Hempies du Toit for their efforts to make Tobias feel welcome.

The All Black visit to South Africa in 1985 was cancelled due to political pressure from anti-apartheid organizations. Trials had already been held to select a national squad. To compensate South African players for the cancellation, the South African Rugby Board selected a so-called "Shadow" Springbok team for an internal tour. The team included Louw and two players of colour, Dolly Ntaka from the black South African Rugby Association, and Wilfred Cupido from the coloured Western Province Leagues.

=== International caps ===
No.	Opposition	Result	Position	Tries	Date	Venue
1.	South America	24 – 9	Flank		26 April 1980	Wanderers Stadium, Johannesburg
2.	South America	18 – 9	Flank		3 May 1980	Kings Park Stadium, Durban
3.	British and Irish Lions	26 – 22	Flank	1	31 May 1980	Newlands Stadium, Cape Town
4.	British and Irish Lions	26 – 19	Flank	1	14 June 1980	Free State Stadium, Bloemfontein
5.	British and Irish Lions	12 – 10	Flank		28 June 1980	EPRU Stadium, Port Elizabeth
6.	British and Irish Lions	13 – 17	Flank		12 July 1980	Loftus Versfeld Stadium, Pretoria
7.	South America	22 – 13	Flank		18 October 1980	Wanderers, Montevideo
8.	South America	30 – 16	Flank		25 October 1980	Prince of Wales Cricket Club, Santiago
9.	France	37 – 15	Flank		8 November 1980	Loftus Versfeld Stadium, Pretoria
10.	Ireland	23 – 15	Flank	1	30 May 1981	Newlands Stadium, Cape Town
11.	Ireland	12 – 10	Flank		6 June 1981	Kings Park Stadium, Durban
12.	New Zealand	9 – 14	No. 8		15 August 1981	AMI Stadium, Christchurch
13.	New Zealand	22 – 25	Flank		12 September 1981	Eden Park, Auckland
14.	South America	50 – 18	Flank		27 March 1982	Loftus Versfeld Stadium, Pretoria
15.	South America	12 – 21	Flank		3 April 1982	Free State Stadium, Bloemfontein
16.	England	33 – 15	Flank	1	2 June 1984	EPRU Stadium, Port Elizabeth
17.	England	35 – 9	Flank		9 June 1984	Ellis Park Stadium, Johannesburg
18.	South America	32 – 15	Flank	1	20 October 1984	Loftus Versfeld Stadium, Pretoria
19.	South America	21 – 13	Flank		27 October 1984	Newlands Stadium, Cape Town

== Playing abroad ==
=== L'Aquila, 1980–1985 ===
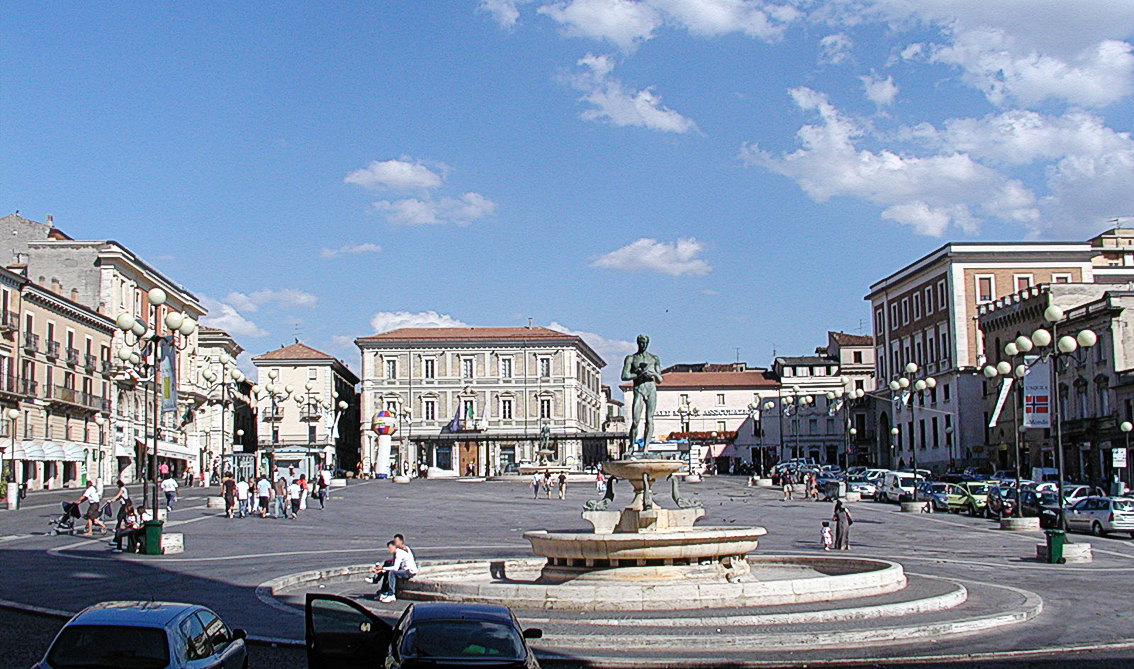
Piazza del Duomo in L'Aquila, capital of the Abruzzo region and Louw's Italian base during the 1980s.

Louw was probably the first rugby player of international standard to play rugby in Italy regularly, from 1980 to 1985. Louw played in the L'Aquila team of 1980–1981 which won the Italian league title, beating Treviso 39–33. He later returned to coach Rugby Roma.

=== Wigan, 1985–1987 ===
After the cancellation of the 1985 All Black tour to South Africa due to South Africa's apartheid policies, Louw joined the professional rugby league club Wigan in England, accompanied by Springbok teammate Ray Mordt. Louw and Mordt's actions caused Danie Craven to inveigle against "traitors", in the context not only of the antipathy between rugby union and rugby league, but also because rugby union at the time was committed to amateurism as guiding principle. In order to sign on at Wigan, Louw and Mordt had to relinquish their amateur status, which excluded them from further involvement with rugby union at the time.

Initially Louw had to play in Wigan's second team, but recently appointed New Zealand coach Graham Lowe soon included him as a lock, alongside Ian Potter, in the first team. Despite good performances by Louw and fellow-South African Nick du Toit in the last games of the season, Wigan lost by one point to Halifax in the race for the 1986 British rugby league title.

Rob Louw appeared as a substitute (replacing second-row Ian Roberts) in Wigan's 15–8 victory over Oldham in the 1986 Lancashire Cup Final during the 1986–87 season at Knowsley Road, St. Helens, on Sunday 19 October 1986.

In 1987, Louw was on the reserve bench but was not used when Wigan beat Warrington to retain the John Player Special Trophy, while Mordt did not make the team. Louw made enough appearances to win a league medal as Wigan won the league in 1986/87.

=== World XVs, 1984, 1997 ===
Louw was selected for two world fifteen matches abroad, both in 1984, and he also played for a South African invitational team against a World XV in 1997.

To commemorate the completion of Cardiff Arms Park, an invitational Wales Rugby Union President's XV was selected to play Wales in 1984. Louw was appointed captain of the President's XV, which included All Blacks Gary Whetton and Steven Pokere, Australian Roger Gould and Peter Grigg, and fellow-South Africans Wilfred Cupido (a coloured player, selected for the Springboks' internal tour of South Africa in 1985) and Henning van Aswegen. On 3 April the World XV encountered Crawshay's Welsh Rugby Football Club at Stradey Park in Llanelli.

Louw was included in the RFU President's XV five months later that played against England on 29 September 1984. Danie Gerber, Errol Tobias, and Rudi Visagie were among his teammates, while the England squad included Rob Andrew, Rory Underwood and Clive Woodward.

In 1997, Louw played in a South African team against a World XV in Stellenbosch to benefit Keith Andrews and Robert Jones. The South African team included Danie Gerber, Breyton Paulse and Nick Mallett, while the World XV boasted Scotland's Gavin Hastings, the Frenchmen Philippe Saint-André and Philippe Sella, Wales' Phil Davies, and England's Peter Winterbottom and Mike Teague.

=== Classics tournaments ===
Louw has turned out in several tournaments for former international players. In November 1997, he participated in the World Rugby Classic series in Bermuda, alongside Wilfred Cupido, Helgard Muller, and Mkaya Jack. In April 2000 he played in the Golden Oldies tournament in Japan, along with Gysie Pienaar, Avril Williams, Wilfred Cupido, Divan Serfontein, Burger Geldenhuys, and Eben Jansen. In March 2004, Louw was in the squad for the match between the Springbok Legends and the Puma Classics of Argentina at the Olivos Rugby Club in Buenos Aires. Others in the squad included John Allan, James Small, Pieter Hendriks, Garth Wright, Zithobile Ntaka, Dick Muir, and Gary Teichmann.

== Further rugby involvement ==
Louw applied to the South African Rugby Board (SARB) in 1988 for reinstatement as an amateur in order to play in and coach a South African Defence Force club. Louw's appeal was based on an International Rugby Board rule that allowed former professional players to play for Defence Force clubs. The disciplinary committee of the SARB rejected Louw's appeal on the grounds that he was not a serving member of the Defence Force, even though he was a Navy reservist at the time. By 1994, Louw had been allowed to return to rugby, and was coaching Hamilton Rugby Football Club in Greenpoint.

In 1992, Louw was included in a South African Veterans' B team which played against an A team at Dan QueQue Stadium in the black township of New Brighton, Port Elizabeth. The match was notable for the exploits of Bantu Holomisa, who sprinted 40 metres to score a try for the A team, which won 35–34. Other members of the team included Hennie Bekker, alongside players of colour such as Godfrey Symons and Aslam Toefy. Louw succeeded with a goal kick for the B team, which included Norman Xhoxho, Zola Dunjwa and Zola Yeye. In the main curtain raiser, an invitational A team was beaten 52–47 by a B team that included Mike Catt, who later represented England in their Rugby World Cup Final victory in 2003.

Louw served as manager of South Africa's Sevens rugby team at the Commonwealth Games in Manchester in July 2002. Earlier that year he was one of the co-presenters on four training programs in Gauteng that was co-sponsored by rugby ball manufacturer Gilbert and the Afrikaans newspaper Beeld.

== Family ==
Louw is married to Azille and is the father of a son, Robbie, and three daughters: Mystique, Shahnee, and Roxanne (Roxy), a model who was the face of Oakley's 2005-2010 international advertising campaign. Azille returned in April 1987 to Cape Town so that Roxy could be born in South Africa. Louw followed at the end of May. The Louws live in Durbanville, a rural residential suburb of the greater Cape Town Metropolis.

== Personal life and health ==
Louw sued SA Sports Illustrated in 1987 to prevent the magazine from publishing a photograph in which the rugby player posed in such a way as to suggest that he was naked, apart from a strategically placed rugby ball. The image was meant to mirror a similar one of South African cricket captain Clive Rice, published a couple of years previously. SA Sports Illustrated and Louw settled the matter out of court, with the magazine agreeing not to publish.

In 1990, Louw incurred serious injuries to his right upper arm during the Mykonos Cup race for inflatable rubber boats at Langebaan lagoon. Louw was flung from his boat and mauled by the propeller blade of another competitor. Only the fast action of his brother, Mark, and para-medics prevented him from bleeding to death, as the main artery in the arm had been punctured. Due to a three-hour operation, he recovered full use of his arm, to the extent that he participated in the Yellow Pages celebrity car race at the Kyalami racing circuit eight months later.

Louw was a passenger on a Cessna aircraft that crashed on landing on a game reserve runway in Mpumalanga, South Africa, in 2005. Apart from whiplash, the five passengers were not badly injured, but the aircraft was heavily damaged.

Diagram of biliary system, showing galbladder (9), liver (10,11) and duodenum (19), portions of which were removed from Louw in 2010.

During a gallbladder operation in 2009, surgeons detected aggressive metastatic melanoma in Louw, and the prognosis was that he had five months left to live. Due to the advanced stage of the cancer, Louw was flown to Houston, Texas on 16 October with the help of Stellenbosch magnate Johann Rupert. At the MD Anderson Cancer Center, portions of his duodenum and liver were removed in two operations, and he remained hospitalized for three months. Two weeks after the diagnosis Louw, still in the United States, and former Springbok Robbie Fleck urged crowds attending the Currie Cup Final to wear pink to promote awareness of cancer. After his treatment Louw started using a mixture of herbs to improve his immune system, extolling the virtues of turmeric (Afrikaans, "borrie"), green tea, and black pepper in particular. Although the cancer was in remission, Louw was required to undergo medical scans every three months, which in December 2011 uncovered a growth in his duodenum which had to be excised.

Since his medical diagnosis, Louw has been part of several campaigns to raise awareness of melanoma and cancer, as well as to raise funds for treatment of others. For example, in February 2010, he appeared with other members of the South African Rugby Legends organization at a fundraiser in Cape Town. He also worked with The South African Melanoma Advisory Board in this regard.

== Business interests ==
Louw started a company for manufacturing and racing inflatable boats in 1988, which was registered as Robbiduck in October 1993. In the 1991 Trans-Agulhas challenge race some 25 teams used the company's boats, with Mark Louw racing a catamaran design called Thunderduck. After participating in an inflatable race in Australia in 1990 in one of his Robbiduck boats, Louw obtained an exclusive contract to export them to that country. A similar pattern followed in the United States and Australia. Robbiduck was exporting to California by 1991, and Robbiduck boats broke a world speed record in 1992 at San Diego.

Louw moved his factory from its first location on Cape Town's Waterfront in 1992, by which time the number of workers had increased from one to 25. Thunderducks were exported to California, leading the American Power Boat Association to create a new category in racing inflatables. Thunderduck Inflatables, Inc. was formed in 1996 in San Diego, California, to import Thunderducks to the United States. The company reportedly attracted contracts with Navy Seal Team Command and US civilian companies.

In May 1994, Rob and Mark Louw obtained a court order for the provisional liquidation of Adventure Sports Enterprises, the inflatable rubber boat company in which both had shares. The court heard that the company had suffered as a result of an economic recession, and that it owed Louw R225,000. Due to Louw's inability to manage Robbiduck after his Mykonos Cup accident, Mark reportedly took over the running of Robbiduck and started his own company, Mako Inflatables, in 1995.

Louw is currently the managing director of Robbi Thatch, a roof thatching business that he started in 1989. In 2000 he became the Cape regional representative for MexSport, former All-Black Murray Mexted's rugby agency.

== See also ==
- 1980 British Lions tour to South Africa
- 1981 South Africa rugby union tour of New Zealand
- List of South Africa national rugby union players – Springbok no. 505
