= Mimi Coertse =

South African soprano (1932–2026)

Mimi Coertse DMS
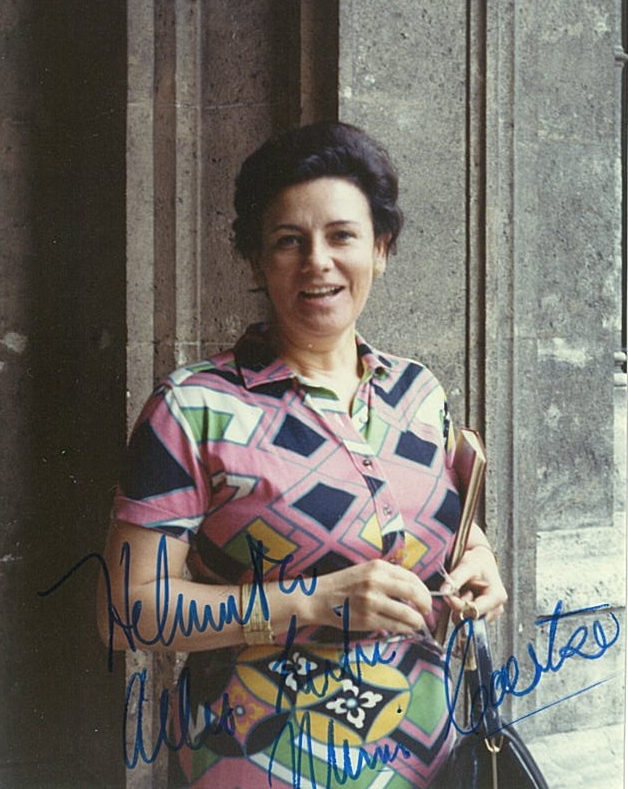
- Coertse in Vienna c. 1966
- Born: Maria Sophia Coertse; 12 June 1932; Durban, Natal, South Africa
- Died: 27 April 2026 (aged 93); Pretoria, Gauteng, South Africa
- Education: Helpmekaar Kollege
- Occupation: Operatic soprano
- Spouses: Dawid Engela (m. 1953; div. 1957) Diego Brighi (m. 1965; div. 1969) Werner Ackerman (m. 1970–1994)
- Children: 2 (adopted)

Maria Sophia Coertse (12 June 1932 – 27 April 2026) was a South African soprano who appeared professionally as Mimi Coertse. Born in Durban, she began her vocal studies in 1949. She moved to Europe in 1953, first to England and later to the Netherlands and Austria. Coertse made her debut in opera in 1955 in Parsifal, and continued to perform with various opera companies until 1978. Coertse attained the rank of Kammersängerin, and received the Decoration for Meritorious Services, the Austrian Cross of Honour for Science and Art, and an honorary doctorate in philosophy from the University of Pretoria, among others. She was married three times and had two adopted children. Coertse died in April 2026 at the age of 93.

== Early life ==
Coertse, born in Durban on 12 June 1932, matriculated at the Helpmekaar Girls High School in Johannesburg. She began vocal studies in South Africa in 1949. Her first vocal coach in Johannesburg was Aimee Parkerson.

Her debut performance in South Africa was singing Handel's Messiah at the Johannesburg City Hall on 11 December 1951. In July 1953 she married broadcaster and composer Dawid Engela. She left South Africa in September 1953 for London, and then went via The Hague to Vienna. In January 1954 she started training with Maria Hittorff and Josef Witt.

== Opera career ==
Coertse made her debut in January 1955 as the "first flowermaiden" in Wagner's Parsifal at the Teatro San Carlo in Naples, with Karl Böhm conducting. She also sang in Basel and at the Teatro San Carlo, Naples. On 17 March 1956 she made her debut at the Vienna State Opera as the Queen of the Night in Die Zauberflöte by Mozart and remained with the Vienna State Opera until 1978. Her Covent Garden debut was in 1956, in the same role.

Her roles were limited in the United Kingdom as the Equity boycott of South Africa due to Apartheid prevented its members from having anything to do with South Africa's entertainment industry. Coertse sang the soprano part in Bach's Matthäus-Passion at Fritz Wunderlich's first appearance in Vienna in 1958, when he performed the tenor arias with Julius Patzak singing the Evangelist. In 1958, Coertse and Fritz Wunderlich again worked together at the Aix-en-Provence festival in Die Zauberflöte.

In 1965, she sang Konstanze in Die Entführung aus dem Serail at the Vienna State Opera which also featured Fritz Wunderlich as Belmonte. In 1966, Coertse was honoured by the President of Austria with the title Österreichische Kammersängerin, for her ten years of work as a permanent member at the Vienna State Opera.

Her repertoire also included:

- The Magic Flute (Wolfgang Amadeus Mozart) – Queen of the night
- Il Seraglio (Wolfgang Amadeus Mozart) – Constance
- Ariadne auf Naxos (Richard Strauss) – Najade, later Zerbinetta
- Rigoletto (Giuseppe Verdi) – Gilda
- The Tales of Hoffmann (Jacques Offenbach) – Olympia, Antonia, Giulietta, Stella
- Palestrina (Hans Pfitzner) – the Angel
- Carmen (Georges Bizet) – Frasquita
- Martha (Friedrich von Flotow) – Martha
- Mignon (Ambroise Thomas) – Philine
- La traviata (Giuseppe Verdi) – Violetta
- I Pagliacci (Ruggiero Leoncavallo) – Nedda
- Arabella (Richard Strauss) – Fiaker-Milli
- Bastien und Bastienne (Wolfgang Amadeus Mozart) – Bastienne
- The Merry Widow (Franz Lehár) – Hanna Glawari
- Lucia di Lammermoor (Gaetano Donizetti) – Lucia
- Die Fledermaus (Johann Strauss II) – Rosalinde
- L'heure espagnole (Maurice Ravel) – Concepcion, staging Otto Schenk
- Don Giovanni (Wolfgang Amadeus Mozart) – Donna Elvira
- La bohème (Giacomo Puccini) – Musetta
- Norma (Vincenzo Bellini) – Norma
- Così fan tutte (Wolfgang Amadeus Mozart) – Fiordiligi
- Falstaff (Giuseppe Verdi) – Mrs. Alice Ford
- Turandot (Giacomo Puccini) – Liu, a young slave
- Don Giovanni (Wolfgang Amadeus Mozart) – Donna Anna
- Die schweigsame Frau (Richard Strauss) – Aminta, Timida 1968 Premiere Vienna State Opera, staging Hans Hotter
- Die ägyptische Helena (Richard Strauss) – Aithra
- Daphne (Richard Strauss) – Daphne
- Don Carlos (Giuseppe Verdi) – Elisabeth von Valois

== Later years ==
After returning to South Africa in 1973, she was a regular guest on South African stages and also a frequent broadcaster on radio and television. She returned to the Vienna State Opera for a single farewell performance as Elisabetta in Don Carlo on 14 December 1978.

In later years, she devoted her time to exposing young South African singers to the neglected art of Lieder singing, which is comparable to opera in terms of technical and interpretive demands. Her support for her fellow South African musicians was significant, including the Mimi Coertse Bursary.

In 1996, Austria's Federal Ministry for Science and Art awarded her the Austrian Decoration for Science and Art (Austrian Honour, first class), the highest honour an artist can receive in that country.

In 1998, she received an honorary doctorate from the University of Pretoria and another in 2013 from the Unisa. In 2002 she received the Golden Rathausmann from the mayor of Vienna.

In 1998, Coertse and Neels Hansen founded The Black Tie Ensemble, a development project which enables young, classically trained singers to bridge the gap between training and professional performance.

== Personal life and death ==
Coertse was married three times. Her first marriage, to South African composer Dawid Engela in 1953, ended in divorce in 1957. Her second marriage was to Italian businessman Diego Brighi in 1965; they divorced in 1969. Her last marriage was to a South African businessman, Werner Ackerman, from 1970 until 1994. After five miscarriages, she adopted two children, Werner and Mia.

Coertse died on 27 April 2026, at the age of 93, in Pretoria, Gauteng, South Africa.

== Honours and awards ==
- 1966: Title of Kammersängerin
- 1985: Decoration for Meritorious Services (South Africa) in recognition of her contribution to the Arts
- August 1996: Austrian Cross of Honour for Science and Art
- 1998: Honorary Doctor of Philosophy (h.c.) from the University of Pretoria, South Africa
- 2002: Golden "Rathausmann"
- In 2004: Voted 94th in the Top 100 Great South Africans
- In 2008: Mimi Coertse Museum van Afrikaans opened at HAP – Huis van Afrikaanse Poësie in Capital Park, Pretoria.
- 2020: Inaugurated as a living legend in the South African Legends Museum. She was one of only 20 legends from whom a bust was also made.

== Literature ==
- Helmuth Furch, "Die Wiener Jahre von Kammersängerin Mimi Coertse", ("The Viennese Years of Kammersängerin Mimi Coertse"), Bulletin of Museums- und Kulturverein Kaisersteinbruch No. 41, 20–56, March 1996: also "Mimi Coertse, die hochgeschätzte Konzert- und Liedsängerin" ("A Reverence for a Great Concert- and Lieder-singer"), Bulletin of Museums- und Kulturverein Kaisersteinbruch No. 52, 33–54, December 1998.
- Helmuth Furch, Eva Hilda Smolik and Elfriede Werthan, Kammersängerin Mimi Coertse, eine Wienerin aus Südafrika (Kammersängerin Mimi Coertse, a Viennese Woman from South Africa; with a preface by Marcel Prawy), Vienna, 2002.
