= 1925 in South Africa =

- Decades: 1900s; 1910s; 1920s; 1930s; 1940s
- See also: List of years in South Africa

The following lists events that happened during 1925 in South Africa.

== Incumbents ==
- Monarch: King George V.
- Governor-General and High Commissioner for Southern Africa: The Earl of Athlone.
- Prime Minister: J.B.M. Hertzog.
- Chief Justice: James Rose Innes.

== Events ==
May

- 1 – The Prince of Wales arrives in Cape Town on a visit to South Africa.

July

- 23 – D.F. Malan, Minister of the Interior, introduces the Areas Reservation and Immigration and Registration Bill, also known as the Asiatic Bill.

Augustus

- 1 – The New Cape Central Railway and its 204 miles 69 chains (329.7 kilometres) long line between Worcester and Voorbaai is incorporated into the South African Railways (SAR).

Unknown date

- Afrikaans officially replaces Dutch as the second official language after English.
- The manor house of Groot Constantia is gutted by a fire.
- The University of Pretoria begins the tradition of Jool in South Africa.
- South Africa returns to the gold standard.

== Births ==
- 14 April – Colin Eglin, founding member and leader of the Progressive Federal Party. (d. 2013)
- 4 May – Ruth First, journalist, academic and activist. (d. 1982)
- 6 June – Andrew Mlangeni, anti-apartheid activist. (d. 2020)
- 19 June – Alfred Nzo, anti-apartheid activist. (d. 2000)
- 28 September – Cromwell Everson, composer. (d. 1991)
- 5 October – Herbert Kretzmer, journalist and lyricist (d. 2020)
- 14 October – Phillip Tobias, palaeoanthropologist. (d. 2012)

== Deaths ==
- 30 August – Cathcart William Methven, civil engineer and painter. (b. 1849)

== Railways ==
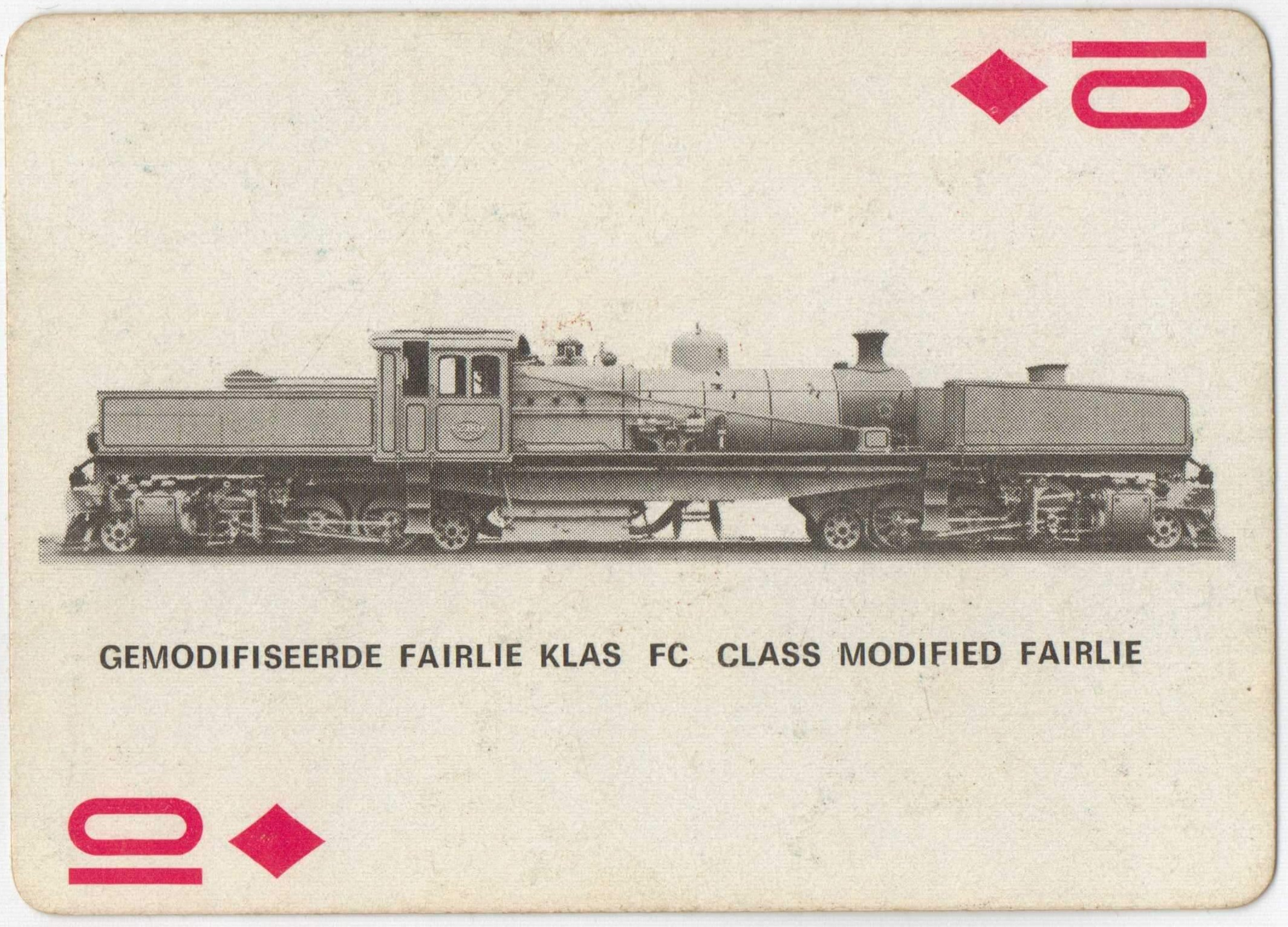
Class FC Modified Fairlie

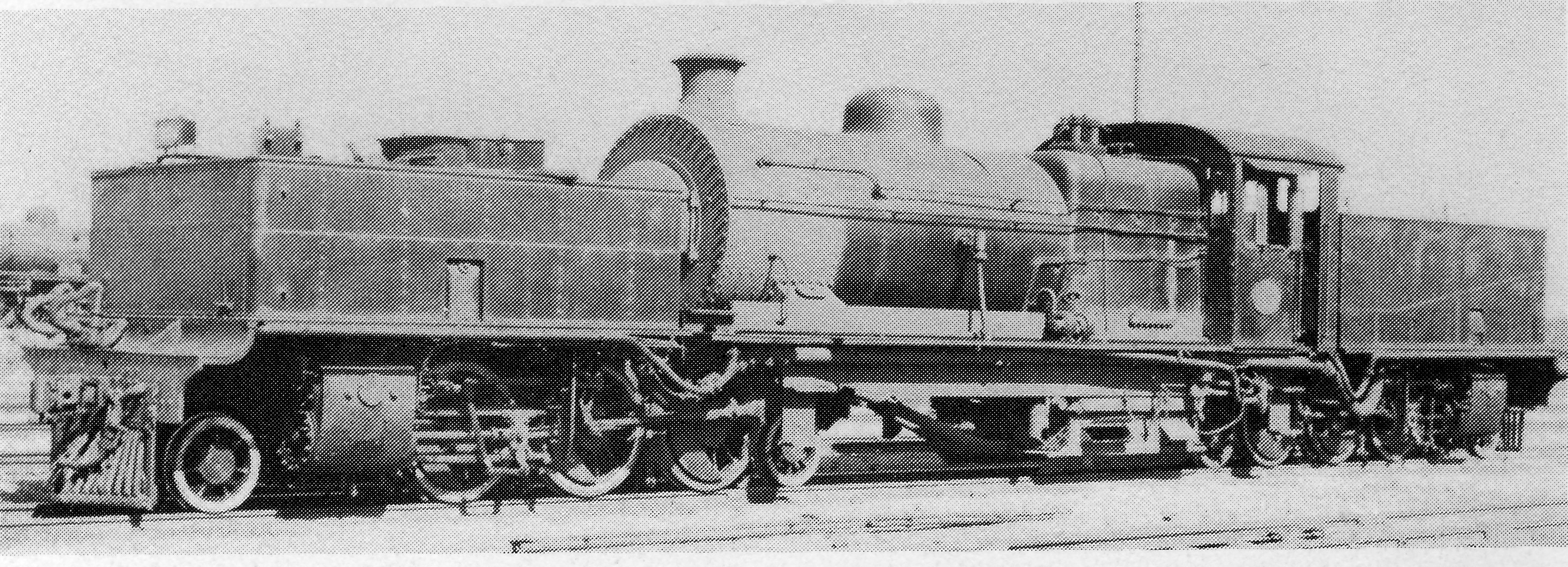
Class GD Garratt

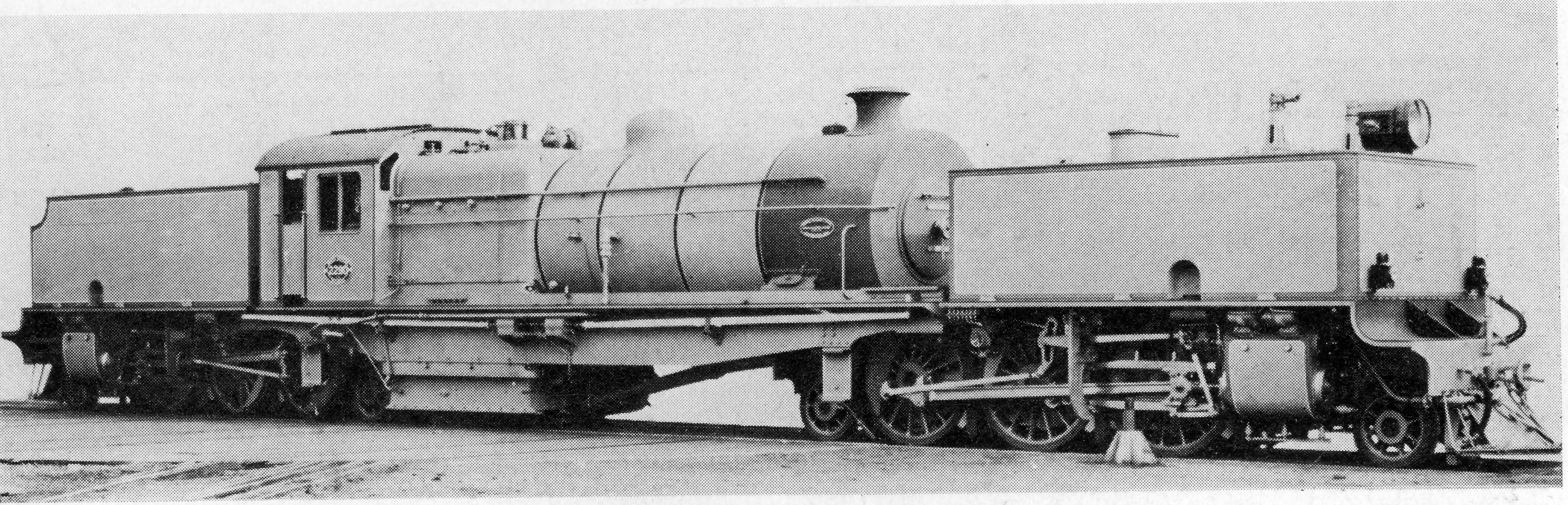
Class GG Garratt

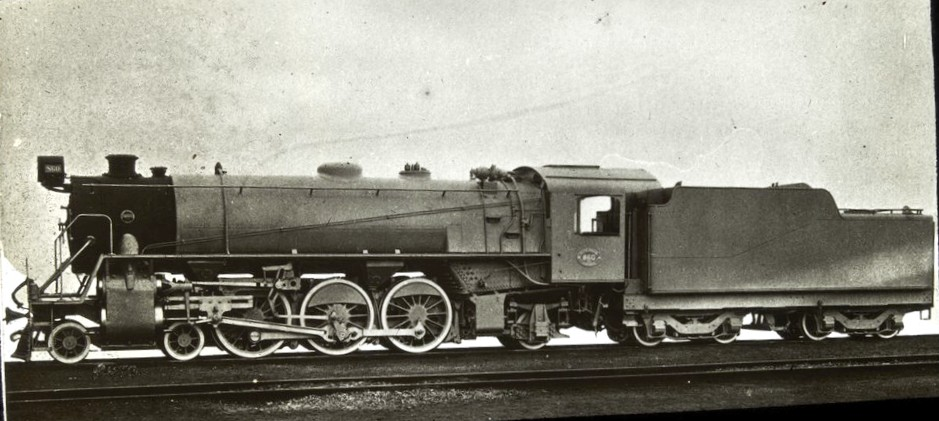
Class 16D

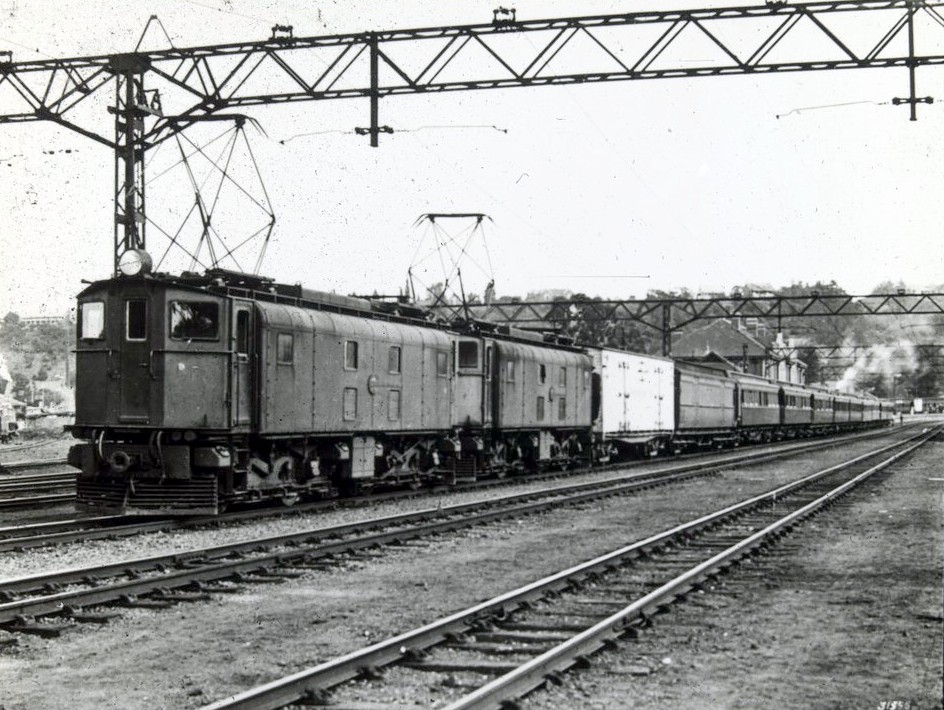
Class 1E

=== Railway lines opened ===
- 21 January – Transvaal – Rustenburg to Boshoek, 15 miles 17 chains (24.5 kilometres).
- 26 May – Transvaal – Magaliesburg to Schoemansville, 33 miles 20 chains (53.5 kilometres).
- 26 June – Natal – Eshowe to Extension, 74 chains (1.5 kilometres).
- 1 September – Transvaal – Ermelo to Lothair, 30 miles 51 chains (49.3 kilometres).
- 25 September – Transvaal – Elandshoek to Solarvale (Narrow gauge), 9 miles 40 chains (15.3 kilometres).
- 1 October – Transvaal – Nylstroom to Vaalwater, 45 miles 62 chains (73.7 kilometres).
- 14 October – Free State – Senekal to Marquard, 29 miles 78 chains (48.2 kilometres).
- 19 October – Cape – Kareevlakte to Ladismith, 46 miles 38 chains (74.8 kilometres).
- 26 November – Free State – Frankfort to Villiers, 19 miles 40 chains (31.4 kilometres).
- 1 December – Cape – Fort Beaufort to Katberg (Narrow gauge), 24 miles 36 chains (39.3 kilometres).

=== Locomotives ===
Seven new Cape gauge locomotive types, six steam and one electric, enter service on the SAR. The electric locomotive is the first non-steam mainline locomotive type to enter service in South Africa in quantity.

- A single experimental Class FC Modified Fairlie articulated steam locomotive.
- The first four Class GD branchline 2-6-2+2-6-2 Garratt articulated locomotives.
- The first six of eighteen Class GE 2-8-2+2-8-2 Garratt locomotives.
- A single Class GG 2-6-2+2-6-2 Double Prairie type Garratt on fast mainline passenger service.
- Two American-built Class 15C 4-8-2 Mountain type steam locomotives.
- The first two of seven Class 16D 4-6-2 Pacific type passenger locomotives.
- The first of altogether 172 Class 1E electric locomotives, spread over seven orders, the first mainline electric locomotive to be introduced in South Africa.
