= Outeniqua Railroad Pass =

Mountain pass in South Africa

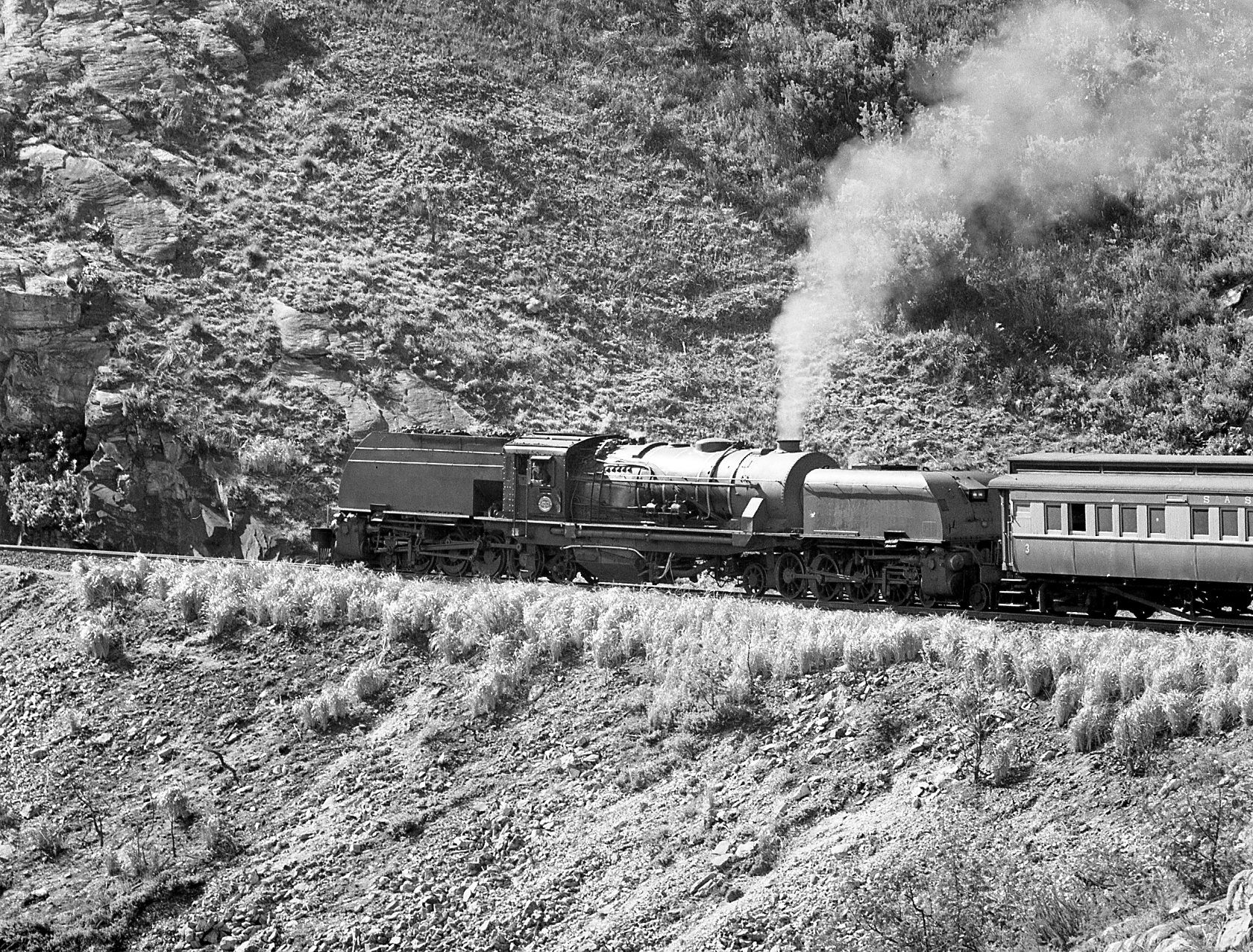
A South African Class GEA 4-8-2+2-8-4 steam locomotive carrying passengers, Outeniqua Railroad Pass, August 15, 1973

Outeniqua Railroad Pass is a mountain pass carrying railway traffic from George over the Outeniqua Mountains to Oudtshoorn. This part of the range is the only one from which this pass, the Outeniqua Pass, Montagu Pass, and Cradock Pass can be seen from one point. All four passes played a major role in connecting George with points further inland.

== History ==
Construction started on the George side of the pass in 1908. Ten tons of explosives were used to break up the hard Table Mountain quartzite, seven tunnels were built into the rock, and a workforce of 2,500 worked on the project. The railway covered a 1:40 grade in some areas of the 34-km pass, completed in 1913. It shortened the route from Port Elizabeth to Cape Town by 267 km.

== The route ==
The pass mainly follows the course of the Montagu Pass and crosses both Cradock Peak (1,579 m) and George Peak (1,327 m), the highest points in the Outeniqua. The railroad crosses the Montagu Pass with a bridge.

== Locomotives ==
Garratt-type locomotives were particularly notable for there use here, including the following classes:

- South African Class GD 2-6-2+2-6-2
- South African Class GE 2-8-2+2-8-2
- South African Class GEA 4-8-2+2-8-4

== See also ==
- List of mountain passes of South Africa
