= 1927 in South Africa =

- Decades: 1900s; 1910s; 1920s; 1930s; 1940s
- See also: List of years in South Africa

The following lists events that happened during 1927 in South Africa.

== Incumbents ==
- Monarch: King George V.
- Governor-General and High Commissioner for Southern Africa: The Earl of Athlone.
- Prime Minister: James Barry Munnik Hertzog.
- Chief Justice: James Rose Innes then William Henry Solomon

== Events ==
March

- 4 – An organised diamond rush includes trained athletes who have been hired by major companies to stake claims.

August

- 20 – The restored manor house of Groot Constantia is reopened after a fire devastated it in 1925.

Unknown date

- The South African Railways (SAR) begins to convert the couplers of its Cape Gauge rolling stock from the Johnston link-and-pin coupling system, which had been in use since 1873, to AAR knuckle couplers.

== Births ==
- 13 January – Sydney Brenner, biologist and Nobel Prize laureate, in Germiston, Johannesburg. (d. 2019)
- 13 May – Duma Nokwe, first black advocate of the Supreme Court of Transvaal and politician, (d. 1978)
- 20 March – John Joubert, South African–born British composer. (d. 2019)
- 10 June – Mizream Maseko, artist and Zion Christian Church deacon.
- 12 June – John Nkadimeng, politician, (d. 2020)
- 26 June – Ben Turok, activist, economics professor, former ANC member of parliament. (d. 2019)
- 22 October – Allan Hendrickse, politician, in Uitenhage. (d. 2005)

== Railways ==
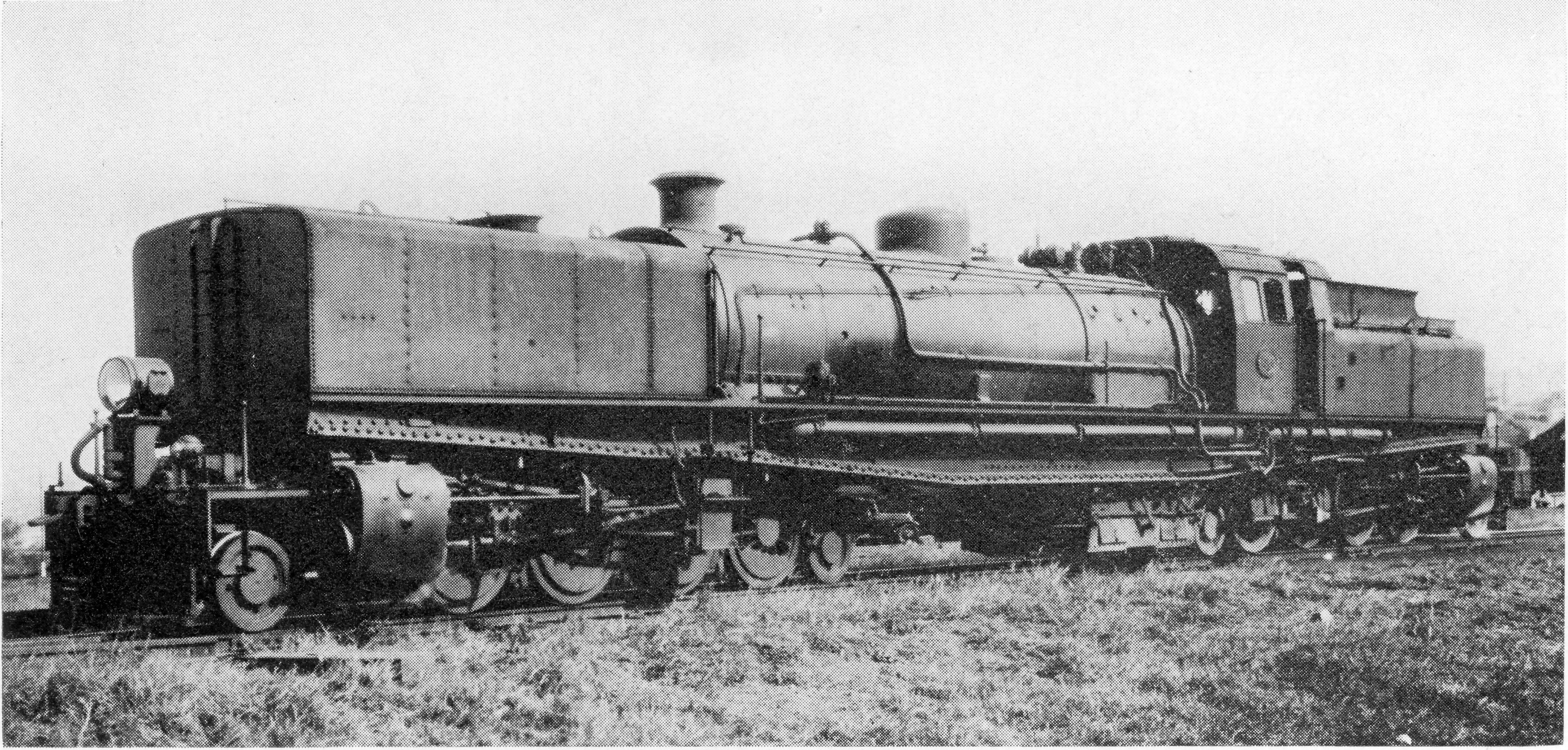
Class HF Henschel Fairlie

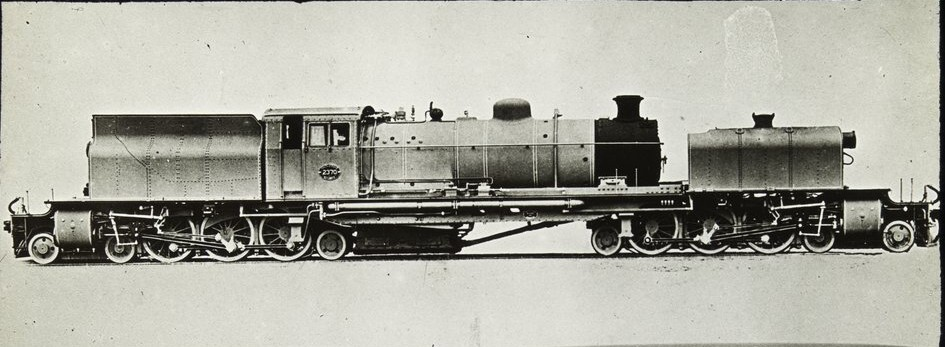
Class GF Garratt

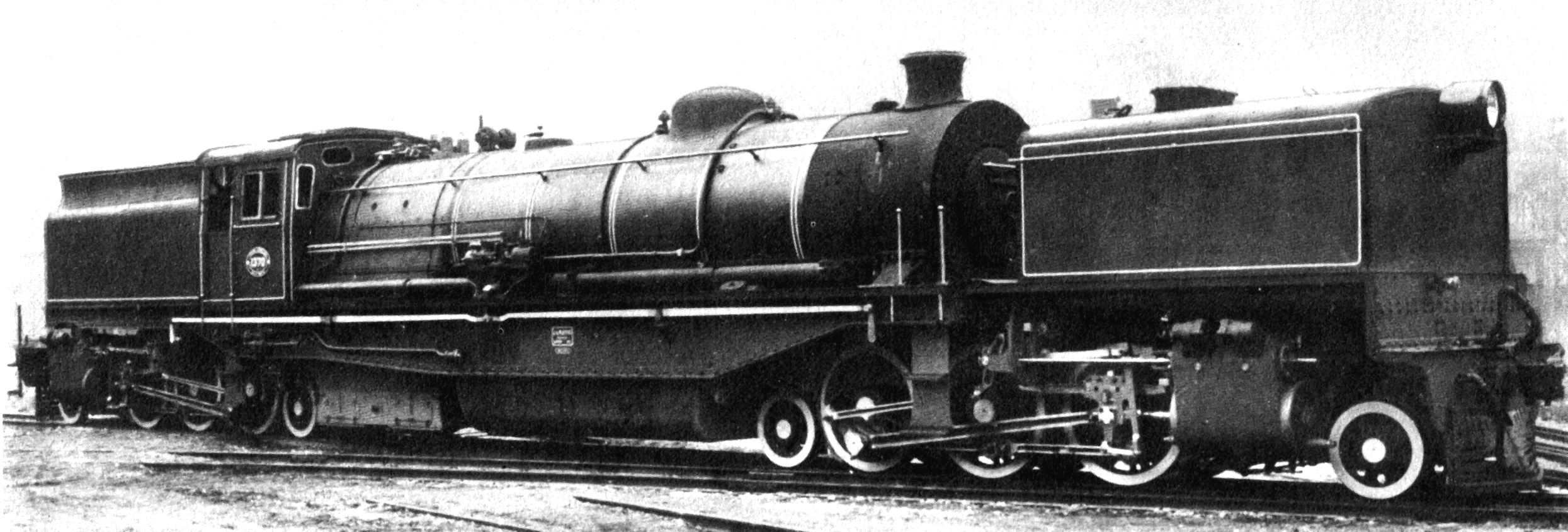
Class U Union Garratt

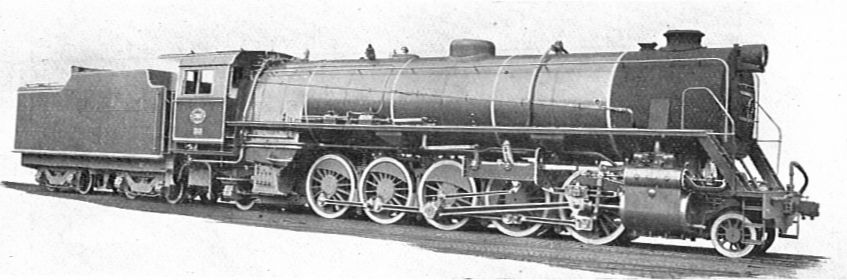
Class 18

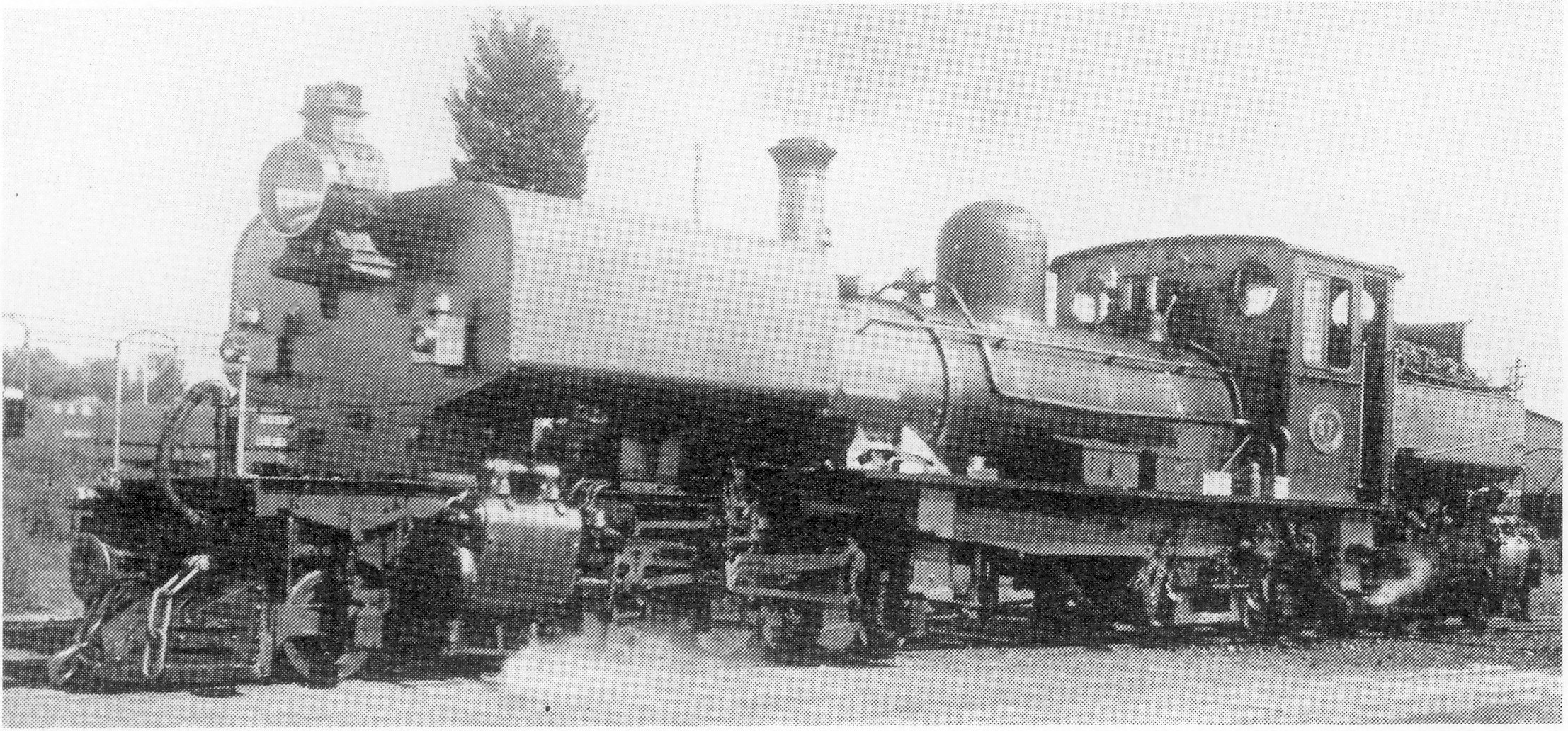
Class NG G12 Garratt

=== Railway lines opened ===
- 7 January – Cape – Sunland to Kirkwood, 14 miles 54 chains (23.6 kilometres).
- 10 February – Transvaal – Solarvale to Mount Carmel, 2 miles 25 chains (3.7 kilometres).
- 27 April – Cape – Landplaas to Bitterfontein, 31 miles 63 chains (51.2 kilometres).
- 1 July – Transvaal – Makwassie to Vermaas, 59 miles 29 chains (95.5 kilometres).
- 4 July – Natal – Candover to Golela, Transvaal, 12 miles 27 chains (19.9 kilometres).
- 14 September – Cape – Imvani to Qamata, 26 miles 79 chains (43.4 kilometres).

=== Locomotives ===
Seven new steam locomotive types, five Cape gauge and two narrow gauge, enter service on the SAR. All the Cape Gauge locomotives were delivered equipped with the new AAR knuckle couplers.

- Ten Class HF 2-8-2+2-8-2 Double Mikado type Modified Fairlie articulated steam locomotives.
- Thirteen Class GCA 2-6-2+2-6-2 Double Prairie type Garratt articulated branchline locomotives.
- Thirty-seven Class GF 4-6-2+2-6-4 Double Pacific type Garratt locomotives.
- Ten Class U 2-6-2+2-6-2 Double Prairie type Union Garratt articulated locomotives.
- In December, the first of two Class 18 2-10-2 Santa Fe type locomotives.
- Two Class NG G12 2-6-2+2-6-2 Double Prairie type narrow gauge Garratt locomotives. They are the smallest Garratt locomotives to see service in South Africa.
- The first three Class NG G13 2-6-2+2-6-2 Double Prairie type Garratt locomotives, on the Langkloof and Alfred County Railway narrow gauge railways.
