= South African Class HF 2-8-2+2-8-2 =

1927 articulated steam locomotive

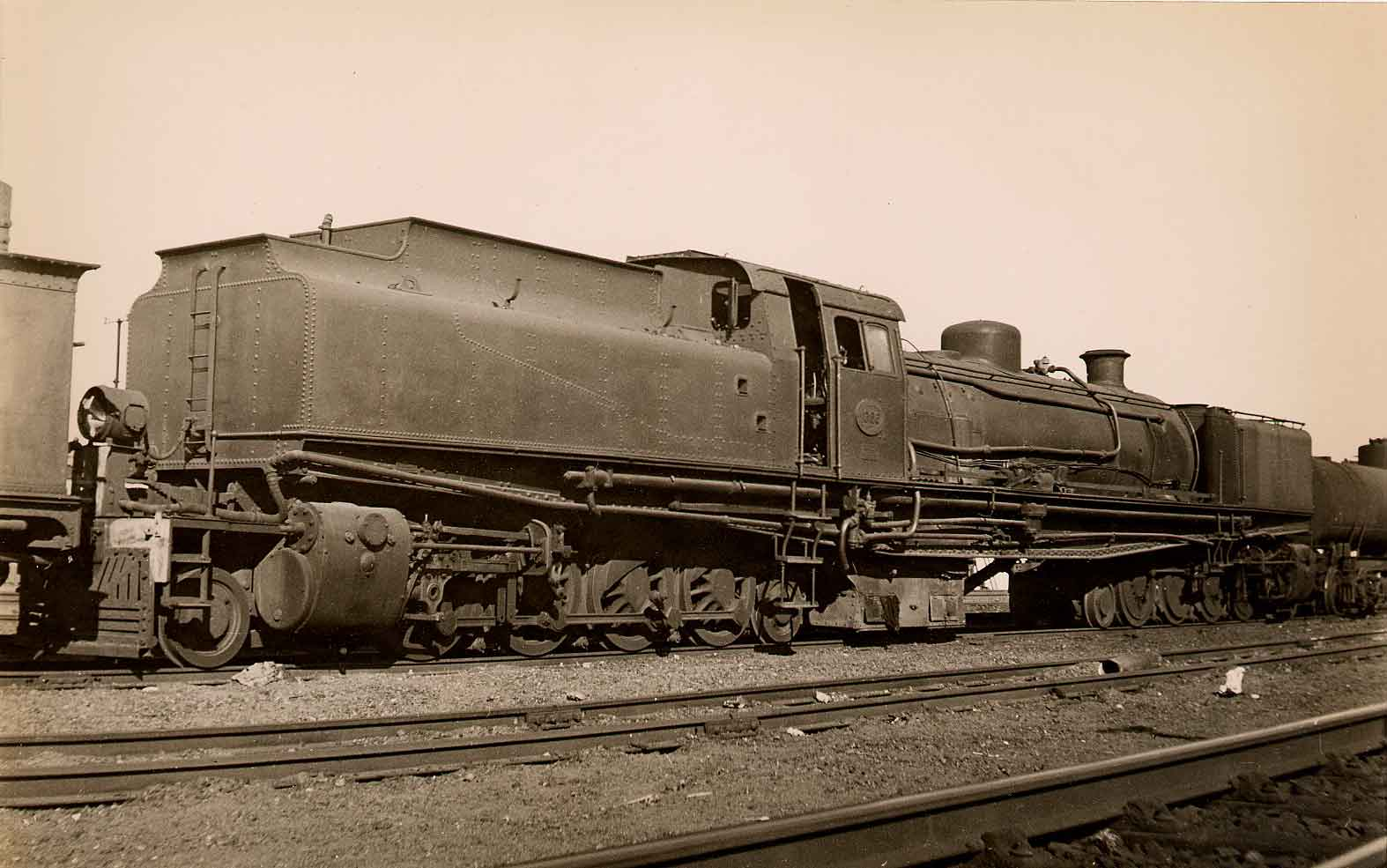
- Class HF no. 1386, c. 1940
Type and origin
- Power type: Steam
- Designer: Henschel and Son
- Builder: Henschel and Son
- Serial number: 20698–20707, 21052
- Model: Class HF
- Build date: 1926–1927
- Total produced: 11
Specifications
- Configuration
  - Whyte: 2-8-2+2-8-2T (Double Mikado)
  - UIC: 1'D1'+1'D1'h4t
- Driver: 3rd & 6th coupled axles
- Gauge: 3 ft 6 in (1,067 mm) Cape gauge
- Leading dia.: 28 1/2 in (724 mm)
- Coupled dia.: 45 1/2 in (1,156 mm) as built 46 in (1,168 mm) retyred
- Trailing dia.: 28 1/2 in (724 mm)
- Wheelbase: 69 ft 10 in (21,285 mm)
  - Engine: 22 ft 10 1/2 in (6,972 mm) each
  - Coupled: 12 ft 9 in (3,886 mm) each
- Pivot centres: 42 ft 1 in (12,827 mm)
- Length
  - Over couplers: 77 ft 6 3/4 in (23,641 mm)
- Height: 12 ft 11 3/4 in (3,956 mm)
- Frame type: Bar
- Axle load: 13 LT 2 cwt (13,310 kg)
  - Leading: 11 LT 6 cwt (11,480 kg) front 12 LT 2 cwt (12,290 kg) rear
  - 1st coupled: 12 LT 7 cwt (12,550 kg)
  - 2nd coupled: 12 LT 17 cwt (13,060 kg)
  - 3rd coupled: 12 LT 14 cwt (12,900 kg)
  - 4th coupled: 12 LT 15 cwt (12,950 kg)
  - 5th coupled: 13 LT (13,210 kg)
  - 6th coupled: 12 LT 19 cwt (13,160 kg)
  - 7th coupled: 13 LT 2 cwt (13,310 kg)
  - 8th coupled: 13 LT 2 cwt (13,310 kg)
  - Trailing: 11 LT 16 cwt (11,990 kg) front 12 LT 1 cwt (12,240 kg) rear
- Adhesive weight: 102 LT 16 cwt (104,400 kg)
- Loco weight: 150 LT 1 cwt (152,500 kg)
- Fuel type: Coal
- Fuel capacity: 9 LT (9.1 t)
- Water cap.: 3,000 imp gal (13,600 L) front 1,600 imp gal (7,270 L) rear
- Firebox
  - Type: Round-top
  - Grate area: 53 sq ft (4.9 m^{2})
- Boiler
  - Diameter: 5 ft 11 1/8 in (1,807 mm)
  - Tube plates: 15 ft (4,572 mm)
  - Small tubes: 169: 2 in (51 mm)
  - Large tubes: 34: 5 1/2 in (140 mm)
- Boiler pressure: 180 psi (1,241 kPa)
- Safety valve: Pop
- Heating surface
  - Firebox: 184 sq ft (17.1 m^{2})
  - Tubes: 2,062 sq ft (191.6 m^{2})
  - Arch tubes: 25 sq ft (2.3 m^{2})
  - Total surface: 2,271 sq ft (211.0 m^{2})
- Superheater
  - Heating area: 598 sq ft (55.6 m^{2})
- Cylinders: Four
- Cylinder size: 18 in (457 mm) bore 24 in (610 mm) stroke
- Valve gear: Heusinger
- Valve type: Piston
- Loco brake: Steam
- Train brakes: Vacuum
- Couplers: AAR knuckle
Performance figures
- Tractive effort: 45,640 lbf (203.0 kN) @ 75%
Career
- Operators: South African Railways
- Class: Class HF
- Number in class: 11
- Numbers: 1380–1390
- Delivered: 1927–1928
- First run: 1927
- Withdrawn: 1951

The South African Railways Class HF 2-8-2+2-8-2 of 1927 was an articulated steam locomotive.

In 1927, the South African Railways placed ten Class HF Modified Fairlie articulated steam locomotives with a 2-8-2+2-8-2T "Double Mikado" type wheel arrangement in service. An eleventh one was placed in service in 1928.

== Manufacturer ==
The Class HF Modified Fairlie locomotive was designed and built by Henschel and Son to the specifications of Colonel F.R. Collins DSO, Chief Mechanical Engineer of the South African Railways (SAR). Ten locomotives were built in 1926 and were numbered in the range from 1380 to 1389 when they were delivered in 1927. Another locomotive, number 1390, was built in 1927 and delivered by Henschel in 1928.

While Henschel of Kassel in Germany had built several locomotive types for German South West Africa prior to the First World War, most of which had come onto the SAR roster in 1922, the Class HF was the first locomotive class to be built by them for the SAR.

== Characteristics ==
The Class HF was designed for mainline work and was larger and much heavier than the Classes FC and FD Modified Fairlie branchline locomotives of 1925 and 1926. It was the Modified Fairlie equivalent of the Class GE 2-8-2+2-8-2 Garratt which was similar in both size and mechanical respects. If the earlier classification practice for Modified Fairlie locomotives had been adhered to, it should logically have been designated Class FE, but the inconsequent designation of Class HF for "Henschel Fairlie" was used instead.

The locomotives had Heusinger-Walschaerts valve gear, bar frames and were superheated. They had round-topped fireboxes, unlike the earlier Modified Fairlie locomotives which had Belpaire fireboxes. They were fitted with the Parry soot-blower which enabled the boiler tubes to be cleaned during running conditions. Reversing was effected from the driver's cab by Hendrie's steam reversers. Provision was made for steam to either engine unit to be cut off in emergencies.

The exhaust steam from the rear engine unit was conveyed to the smokebox through a pipe arranged on the left-hand side of the engine on the outside of the main boiler frame. In line with the left-hand side of the smokebox, it then passed through the frame and into the blast pipe. The exhaust steam from the front engine unit passed through a pipe connected directly to the blast pipe, which had two distinct orifices. The two engine units were virtually identical and could be interchanged by a slight alteration in the arrangement of their steam pipes.

The coupled wheels had overhung springs and the leading Bissel and trailing carrier wheels of each engine unit had 3/4 inch (19 millimetres) play to each side, while the radial movement of each engine unit was limited at either end. Each engine unit was provided with a steam brake which was actuated automatically in conjunction with the vacuum train brake. In addition, the rear engine unit was fitted with a screw type handbrake, operated from the cab. The locomotives were fitted with Lambert sanding gear with eight sanders, four in front of four wheels in either direction of running.

The locomotive had Pyle National electric headlamps which were fitted to brackets above the end buffer beam of each engine unit rather than at the top of the bunkers, to allow the lights to follow the curvature of the track. The turbo-generator to power the lights was arranged on top of the boiler ahead of the safety valves.

== Shortcomings ==
As built, the locomotives were not successful, with the result that they were staged for some time while the Mechanical Engineer of the Durban workshops, G. Ramsay, carried out experiments with the blast pipe arrangement. After successful modification, their steaming capacity was improved to the extent that they could be placed in service. Like the earlier Modified Fairlies they proved to be powerful locomotives, but they were less successful than their Garratt equivalent.

They suffered from the same shortcomings as their Class FC and Class FD predecessors. The long rigid frame resulted in severe overhang on sharp curves and was also prone to metal fatigue and cracked frames, brought about by the long frame overhangs at the front and back beyond the engine unit pivot centres. The overhangs, laden with the water and coal bunkers, tended to oscillate in an up-and-down motion while the locomotive was in motion.

The pivot bearings were also subject to quite rapid wear since they carried a considerable additional vertical load concentrated on the centre of the engine units as a result of their water and coal bunkers which were mounted on the main frame instead of on the engine units like those on the Garratt equivalent. This resulted in increased frequency of maintenance and, as a consequence, increased operating cost.

== Service ==
The maximum axle load of 13 long tons 2 hundredweight (14.67 short tons; 13.31 tonnes) of the Class HF locomotives allowed them to run on 60 pounds per yard (29.8 kilograms per metre) rail. They were placed in service on the Natal North Coast line and on the Witwatersrand. They were withdrawn from service by 1951.

No more locomotives of the Modified Fairlie design were acquired by the SAR.

== Knuckle couplers ==
In 1927, the SAR began to convert the couplers of its Cape Gauge rolling stock from the Johnston link-and-pin coupling system which had been in use since the establishment of the Cape Government Railways in 1873, to AAR knuckle couplers. Judging from contemporary photographs as well as the official SAR Locomotive Diagram Book and the dimensional locomotive drawings as published by Holland, which were for the most part based on the original as-delivered and unmodified locomotives, the Class HF locomotives were delivered new with knuckle couplers fitted, as were the Classes 18, GCA, GF and U which also entered service in 1927.

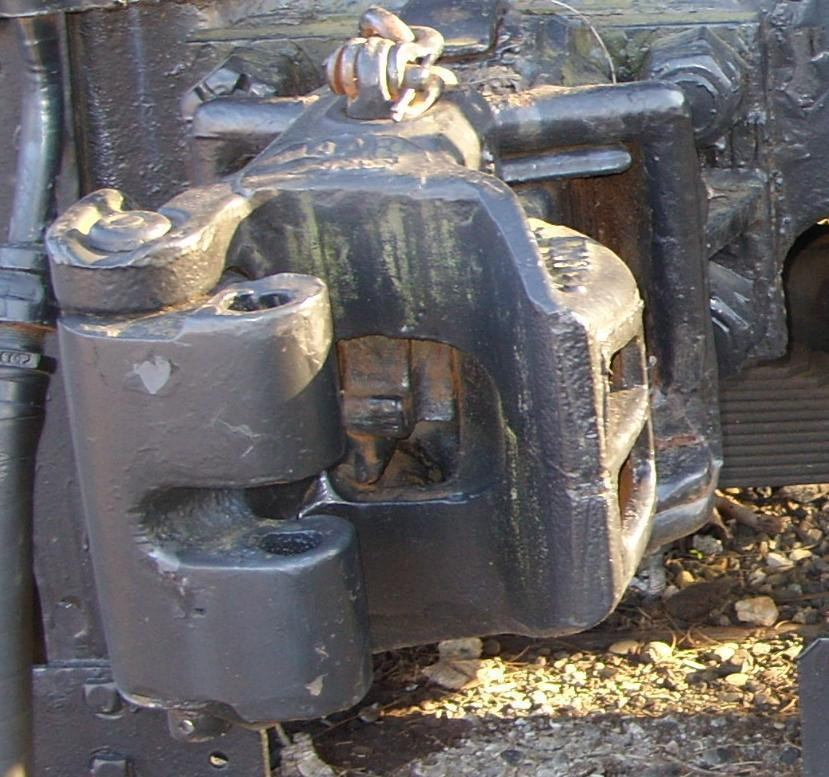
Transition era knuckle coupler

Conversion of all rolling stock would take several years and both coupler types could still be seen on rolling stock into the late 1950s. During the transition period, knuckle couplers on locomotives had a horizontal gap and a vertical hole in the knuckle itself to accommodate a link and a pin respectively. This enabled them to couple to vehicles which were still equipped with the older Johnston couplers.

Knuckle couplers had first been used in South Africa more than two decades earlier. The Central South African Railways (CSAR) introduced Gould knuckle couplers on the rolling stock of its Limited Express and Imperial Mail passenger trains in 1904. The Limited Express operated between Pretoria and Johannesburg while the Imperial Mail operated between Pretoria and Cape Town. These knuckle-couplers also had split knuckles to accommodate coupling to the old Johnston couplers with a link and pin, since the CSAR retained the old couplers on all their locomotives to keep them compatible with their own goods and older passenger rolling stock as well as with that from the other railways it connected with.

== Illustration ==
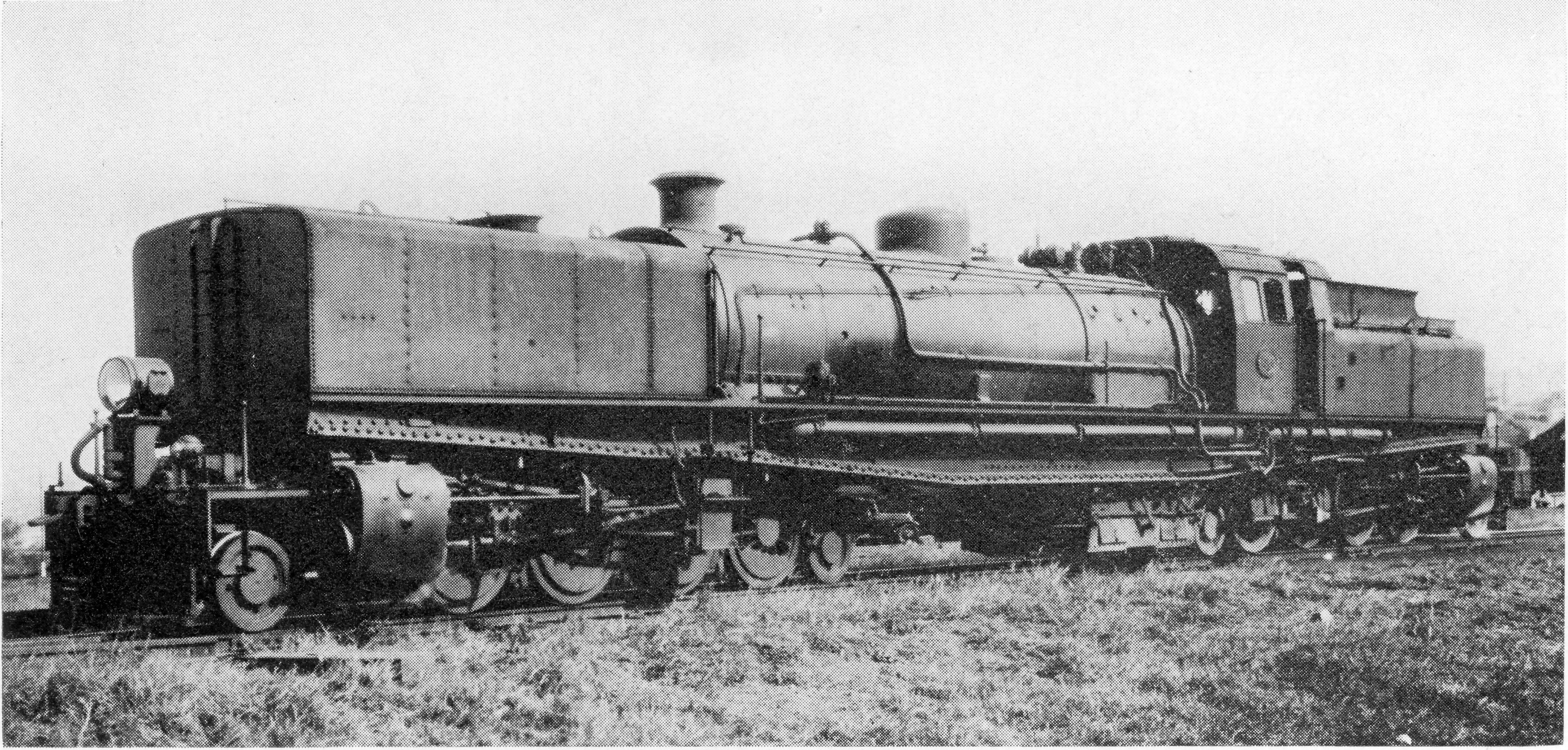
Class HF no. 1386 at Durban locomotive depot, c. 1950
