= 1924 in South Africa =

- Decades: 1900s; 1910s; 1920s; 1930s; 1940s
- See also: List of years in South Africa

The following lists events that happened during 1924 in South Africa.

== Incumbents ==
- Monarch: King George V.
- Governor-General and High Commissioner for Southern Africa:
  - Prince Arthur of Connaught (until 20 January).
  - The Earl of Athlone (from 21 January).
- Prime Minister:
  - Jan Smuts (until 29 June).
  - J.B.M. Hertzog (from 30 June).
- Chief Justice: James Rose Innes.

== Events ==
January

- 21 – Alexander Cambridge, 1st Earl of Athlone is appointed the 4th Governor-General of the Union of South Africa.

March

- 5 – The first one-day flight between Cape Town and Pretoria takes place.

June

- 30 – J.B.M. Hertzog becomes the third Prime Minister of South Africa.

Unknown date

- The Taung Child is discovered.

== Births ==
- 23 February – Allan Cormack, South African-American physicist and 1979 Nobel Prize laureate. (d. 1998)
- 14 July – Stephen Fry, Springbok rugby captain. (d. 2002)
- 26 July – Elias Motsoaledi, political activist. (d. 1994)
- 8 September – Hazel Brooks, actress (d. 2002)
- 28 November – Dennis Brutus, poet and anti-apartheid activist. (d. 2009)
- 5 December – Robert Sobukwe, anti-apartheid activist. (d. 1978)

== Railways ==
=== Railway lines opened ===
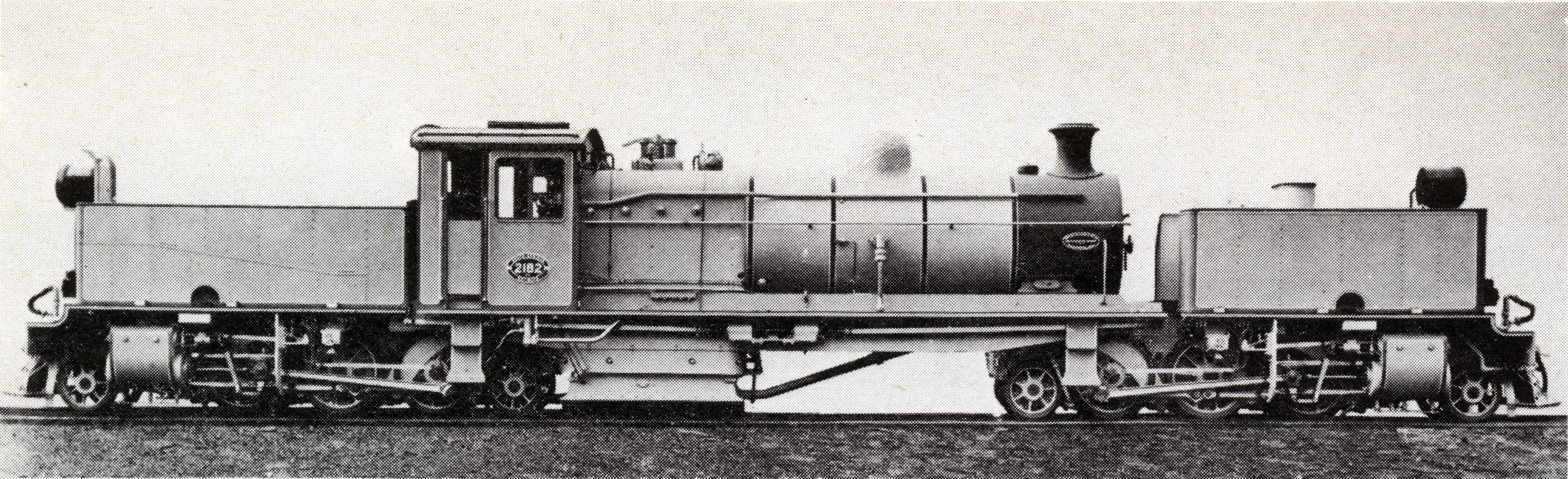
Class GC

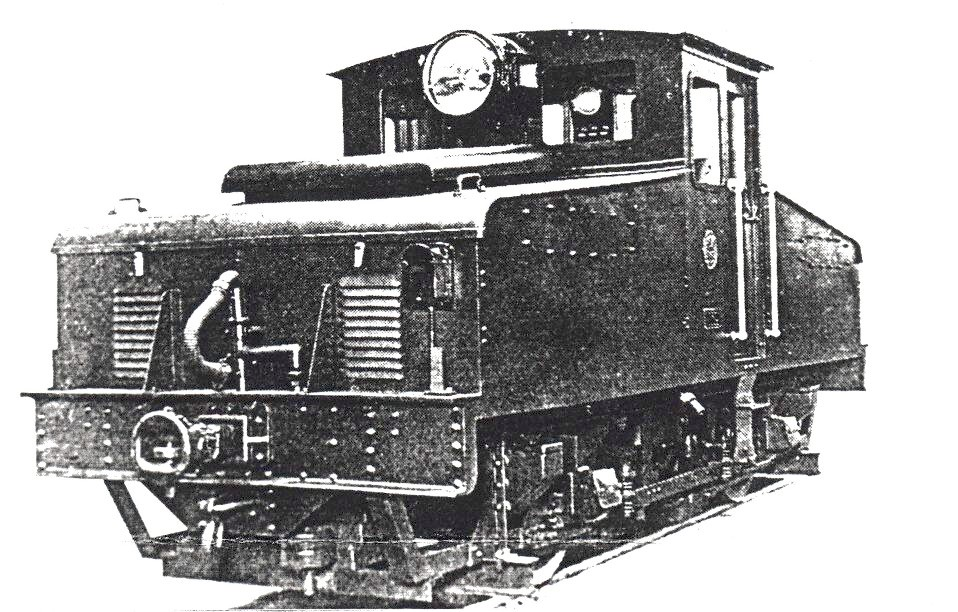
Class ES1

- 16 April – Free State – Wepener to Zastron, 46 miles 62 chains (75.3 kilometres).
- 19 April – Cape – Klipdale to Bredasdorp, 25 miles 36 chains (41.0 kilometres).
- 1 May – Transvaal – Balfour North to Grootvlei, 11 miles 30 chains (18.3 kilometres).
- 16 June – Cape – Pinelands to Langa, 2 miles 51 chains (4.2 kilometres).
- 24 July – Free State – Heilbron to Petrus Steyn, 31 miles 6 chains (50.0 kilometres).
- 10 September – Transvaal – Lydenburg to Steelpoort, 74 miles 40 chains (119.9 kilometres).
- 19 September – South West Africa – Gobabis Junction in Windhoek to Ondekaremba, 29 miles 70 chains (48.1 kilometres).
- 22 September – Transvaal – Naboomspruit to Singlewood, 20 miles 47 chains (33.1 kilometres).
- 3 November – Cape – Franklin to Kokstad, 25 miles 54 chains (41.3 kilometres).
- 4 November – Cape – Franklin to Matatiele, 47 miles 76 chains (77.2 kilometres).
- 14 November – Cape – Oudtshoorn to Calitzdorp, 35 miles 20 chains (56.7 kilometres).
- 15 December – Cape – Touws River to Kareevlakte, 41 miles 59 chains (67.2 kilometres).
- 15 December – Transvaal – Hercules to Schoemansville, 17 miles 64 chains (28.6 kilometres).

=== Locomotives ===
- The first of six Class GC branchline 2-6-2+2-6-2 Garratt articulated locomotives.
- A single Class ES1 battery-powered shunting locomotive at the construction site of the Colenso power station.
