= South African Class GEA 4-8-2+2-8-4 =

1946 articulated steam locomotive

South African Class GEA & GEAM 4-8-2+2-8-4
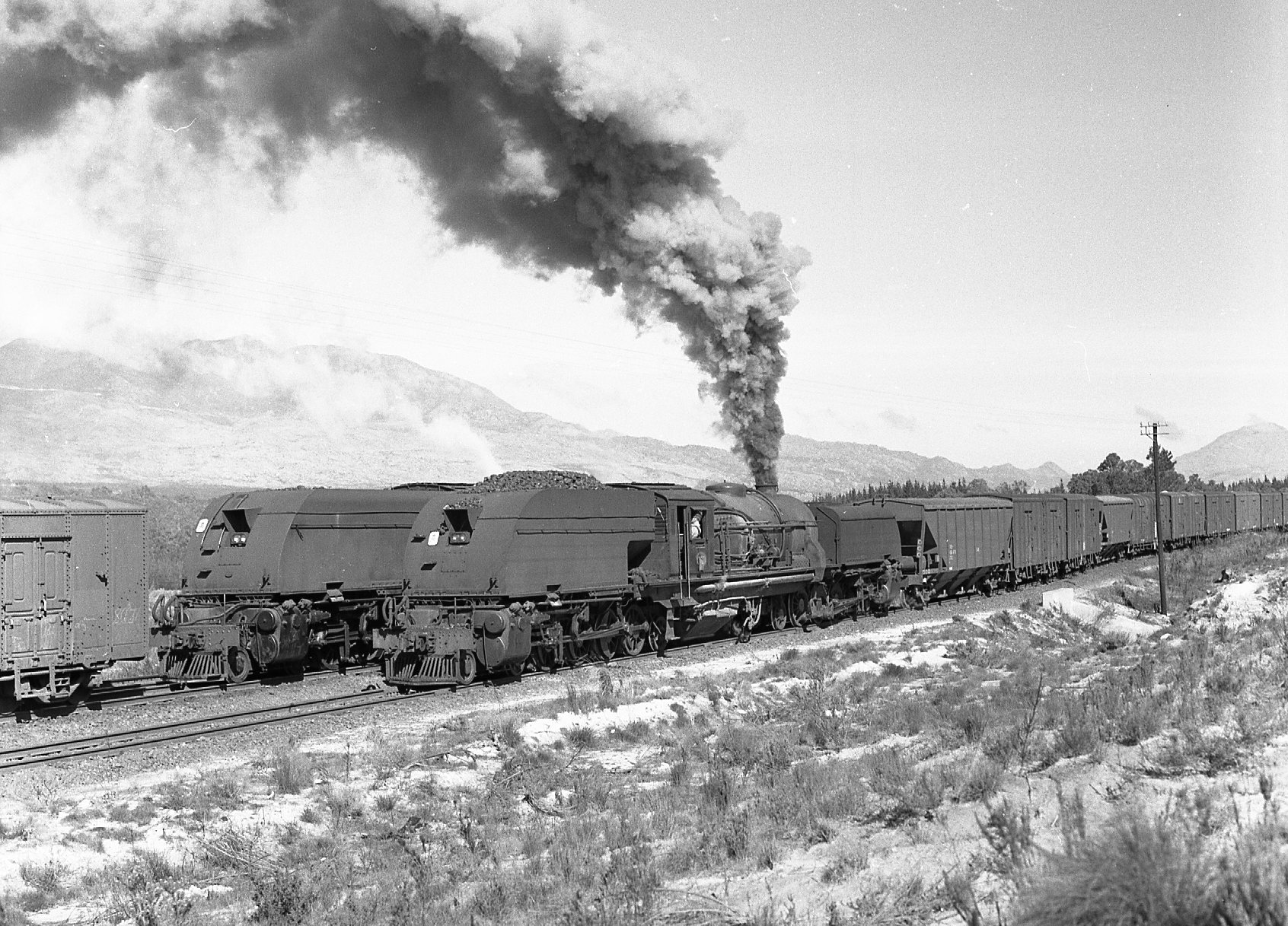
- No. 4010 and sister at Steenbras in August 1973
Type and origin
- ♠ Locomotive as built ♥ Locomotive with modified front water tank
- Power type: Steam
- Designer: South African Railways (Dr. M.M. Loubser)
- Builder: Beyer, Peacock & Company
- Serial number: 7168–7217
- Model: Class GEA
- Build date: 1945–1947
- Total produced: 50
Specifications
- Configuration
  - Whyte: 4-8-2+2-8-4
  - UIC: 2'D1'+1'D2'h4t
- Driver: 3rd & 6th coupled axles
- Gauge: 3 ft 6 in (1,067 mm) Cape gauge
- Leading dia.: 28 1/2 in (724 mm)
- Coupled dia.: 48 in (1,219 mm)
- Trailing dia.: 34 in (864 mm)
- Minimum curve: 275 ft (84 m)
- Wheelbase: 80 ft 10 in (24,638 mm)
  - Engine: 28 ft 4 in (8,636 mm) each
  - Leading: 6 ft 4 in (1,930 mm) each
  - Coupled: 13 ft 4 1/2 in (4,077 mm) each
- Pivot centres: 37 ft 9 in (11,506 mm)
- Length
  - Over couplers: 88 ft 5 in (26,949 mm)
- Height: 13 ft (3,962 mm)
- Frame type: Bar
- Axle load: ♠ 15 LT (15,240 kg) ♥ 15 LT (15,240 kg)
  - Leading: ♠ 22 LT 7 cwt (22,710 kg) front 22 LT 7 cwt (22,710 kg) rear ♥ 22 LT 7 cwt (22,710 kg) front 20 LT 10 cwt (20,830 kg) rear
  - 1st coupled: ♠ 14 LT (14,220 kg) ♥ 13 LT 6 cwt (13,510 kg)
  - 2nd coupled: ♠ 15 LT (15,240 kg) ♥ 14 LT 7 cwt (14,580 kg)
  - 3rd coupled: ♠ 15 LT (15,240 kg) ♥ 15 LT (15,240 kg)
  - 4th coupled: ♠ 14 LT (14,220 kg) ♥ 13 LT 7 cwt (13,560 kg)
  - 5th coupled: ♠ 14 LT (14,220 kg) ♥ 13 LT 6 cwt (13,510 kg)
  - 6th coupled: ♠ 15 LT (15,240 kg) ♥ 14 LT 19 cwt (15,190 kg)
  - 7th coupled: ♠ 15 LT (15,240 kg) ♥ 14 LT 16 cwt (15,040 kg)
  - 8th coupled: ♠ 14 LT (14,220 kg) ♥ 13 LT 15 cwt (13,970 kg)
  - Trailing: ♠ 13 LT 3 cwt (13,360 kg) front 18 LT 8 cwt (18,700 kg) rear ♥ 13 LT 3 cwt (13,360 kg) front 13 LT 2 cwt (13,310 kg) rear
- Adhesive weight: ♠ 116 LT (117,900 kg) ♥ 112 LT 16 cwt (114,600 kg)
- Loco weight: ♠ 187 LT (190,000 kg) ♥ 183 LT 18 cwt (186,900 kg)
- Fuel type: Coal
- Fuel capacity: 10 LT (10.2 t)
- Water cap.: 3,800 imp gal (17,300 L) front 1,800 imp gal (8,180 L) rear
- Firebox
  - Type: Round-top
  - Grate area: 51.3 sq ft (4.77 m^{2})
- Boiler
  - Pitch: 8 ft 6 in (2,591 mm)
  - Diameter: 6 ft 9 in (2,057 mm)
  - Tube plates: 11 ft 8 5/8 in (3,572 mm)
  - Small tubes: 282: 2 in (51 mm)
  - Large tubes: 36: 5 1/2 in (140 mm)
- Boiler pressure: 200 psi (1,379 kPa)
- Safety valve: Ross-pop
- Heating surface
  - Firebox: 185 sq ft (17.2 m^{2})
  - Tubes: 2,328 sq ft (216.3 m^{2})
  - Arch tubes: 27 sq ft (2.5 m^{2})
  - Total surface: 2,540 sq ft (236 m^{2})
- Superheater
  - Heating area: 470 sq ft (44 m^{2})
- Cylinders: 4
- Cylinder size: 18 1/2 in (470 mm) bore 26 in (660 mm) stroke
- Valve gear: Walschaerts
- Valve type: Piston
- Valve travel: 6 1/2 in (165 mm)
- Couplers: AAR knuckle
Performance figures
- Tractive effort: 55,620 lbf (247.4 kN) @ 75%
Career
- Operators: South African Railways
- Class: Class GEA
- Number in class: 50
- Numbers: 4001–4050
- Delivered: 1946/47
- First run: 1946
- Withdrawn: 1976

The South African Railways Class GEA 4-8-2+2-8-4 of 1946 was an articulated steam locomotive.

In 1946 and 1947, the South African Railways placed 50 Class GEA Garratt articulated steam locomotives with a 4-8-2+2-8-4 type wheel arrangement in service.

== Manufacturer ==
The Class GEA 4-8-2+2-8-4 Garratt locomotive was the first new post-World War II locomotive class to be introduced on the South African Railways (SAR). It was designed by Dr. M.M. Loubser, chief mechanical engineer of the South African Railways, and although it was a development of the Class GE 2-8-2+2-8-2 locomotive, it bore little resemblance to the older locomotive.

It had a boiler which was designed to be interchangeable with that of the earlier Garratt model regarding external dimensions, but it had a bar frame and a round-topped firebox instead of the plate frame and Belpaire firebox of the earlier locomotive. The Class GEA was the first South African Garratt to have streamlined water tanks and coal bunkers and its engine units were radically different from those of the Class GE, with an expanded wheel arrangement in the form of a leading four-wheeled bogie instead of a two-wheeled Bissel truck.

An order for 50 locomotives was placed with Beyer, Peacock & Company in 1945, the largest single Garratt order ever placed with them. When they were delivered during 1946 and 1947, they were erected at the Uitenhage shops and numbered in the range from 4001 to 4050.

== Characteristics ==
The locomotives were superheated and had Walschaerts valve gear. They were the only post-war Garratts on the SAR to be without mechanical stokers and also one of the largest designs of Garratt to be manually stoked.

Its round-topped firebox was fitted with eight flexible cross-stays at the front end. The inner firebox was of steel instead of copper and it had a hopper type ashpan, fitted with an efficient arrangement of drench pipes. The ashpan doors were steam-operated with provision for hand operation when required. The finger bar fire grate was operated by two steam shaker cylinders and had two drop grates. The boiler pressure was 20 pounds per square inch (138 kilopascals) higher than that of the Class GE and it had a larger superheater area with 36 elements and incorporating a multiple valve regulator. The locomotive had a self-cleaning smokebox and was fitted with a spark arrester.

Instead of plate frames, it was built on bar frames of 4 inches (102 millimetres) thick rolled steel bar with a tensile strength of 32 to 38 long tons per square inch (5 to 6 tonnes per square centimetre). The pivots were of the adjustable type and were oil lubricated. The wheel arrangement was extended from a 2-8-2+2-8-2 to a 4-8-2+2-8-4 configuration, which permitted increased coal and water capacities. It had 2 inches (51 millimetres) larger diameter coupled wheels, all flanged. The locomotive was designed to negotiate a minimum curve of 275 feet (84 metres) radius, with 4 1/2 inches (114 millimetres) superelevation and gauge widening not exceeding 3/4 inch (19 millimetres).

The outer bogies had two-pin swing links and laminated side control springs which provided for a total side-play of 7 inches (178 millimetres). The outer pairs of bogie wheels were arranged with tyre flange watering gear. The inner bissel trucks were of the radial-arm type with helical spring side control and a total side-play of 4 inches (102 millimetres). The bogies and bissels both had Timken roller bearing axle boxes. The front engine unit had two 21 inches (533 millimetres) diameter vacuum brake cylinders, while the hind engine units were provided with steam and hand brakes.

The cab arrangement was made especially convenient for the crew. The double roof was lined with teak while side louvre ventilators with roller slides were fitted. The cab front and sides had ventilating doors. Sliding louvres in the cab sides provided adequate weather protection while the lookout had hinged adjustable glass windscreens. The cab was completely enclosed with sliding side doors and the crew had upholstered hinged seats with armrests.

== Modifications ==
Soon after they entered service, the front tanks of some of the locomotives were modified. While the tank capacity apparently remained the same, the all-up weight of the modified locomotives and their adhesive weight were 4 long tons (4,064 kilograms) less and their individual axle loads were different, although their maximum axle loads remained at 15 long tons (15,240 kilograms).

Two locomotives, numbers 4036 and 4049, were modified in 1952 by having their coal capacity increased by means of extensions to the upper sides of their coal bunkers. Photographs show that more locomotives were later similarly modified. It does not appear as if these locomotives were ever officially reclassified to identify them as mainline locomotives, although they are referred to as Class GEAM in an annotation in the South African Railways and Harbours Locomotive Diagram Book. The post-modification coal capacity is not specified in the documentation.

In the Western Cape, wheatland fires caused by locomotives were a huge problem for farmers as well as for the SAR who had to pay out the claims. In the late 1960s Johannes Barnard, the assistant locomotive superintendent at Cape Town, used two locomotives to experiment with spark-extinguishing equipment, a Class GEA and a Class 19C. The spark extinguishers were mounted on the chimneys and consisted of two long tubes to extend the exhaust horizontally. The tubes had spray pipes around the vertical outlet at the end to drench any sparks that may have survived the journey along the tubes. In the case of Class GEA no. 4009 the tubes fed the exhaust forward to the outlet above the front end of the Garratt's water bunker, which led to the engine being nicknamed Renoster (rhinoceros). The experiments were not successful.

== Service ==
=== South African Railways ===
The locomotives were designed for goods traffic on light 60 pounds per yard (30 kilograms per metre) rail on branch lines. Some teething troubles were experienced when they were first placed in service, but these were solved and they proved themselves as fine performers. They started their service lives working goods traffic on the lines from Johannesburg to Zeerust in the Western Transvaal.

In the Cape Province, they worked from Voorbaai to Oudtshoorn across the Montagu Pass and in the opposite direction to Riversdale. Some were later transferred to Natal to work on the North Coast line, based at Stanger and Empangeni, and on the Eshowe and Nkwalini branches. They also worked on the Franklin branch and the Overberg line from Cape Town across Sir Lowry's Pass to Caledon. The Class GEA was withdrawn from service by 1976.

=== Royal visit, 1947 ===
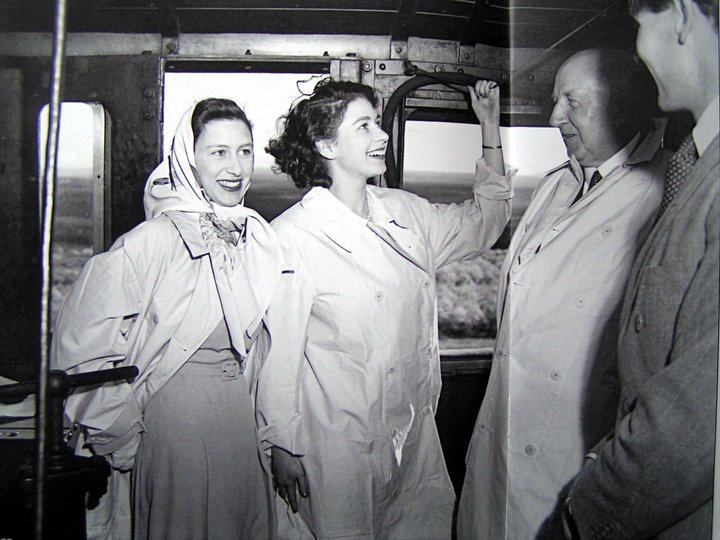
Princesses Margaret and Elizabeth on the footplate of no. 4024

During 1947, King George VI, accompanied by Queen Elizabeth and the Princesses Elizabeth and Margaret, visited the British territories in Southern Africa. The Royal Visit began in South Africa in February. Transport during the Royal Visit was aboard the Royal Train of the SAR, most of which later became the White Train for use by the Governor General of South Africa during the remaining years of the Union era and until the mid-1970s by the State President in the Republican era. During the Royal Visit, only selected British-built locomotives were used as motive power for the Royal Train. One of these was Class GEA no. 4024.

=== Industrial ===
Six Class GEA locomotives were sold into industrial service.

- No. 4003 went to Dunns Locomotive Works in the Witbank area.
- No. 4020 went to Dunns Locomotive Works and was initially used at Enyati Colliery and later at Vryheid Coronation Colliery.
- No. 4023 went to Vryheid Coronation Colliery as no. 6.
- No. 4024 went to Dunns Locomotive Works, for hire in the Witbank area.
- No. 4027 went to Dunns Locomotive Works for use at Enyati Colliery.
- No. 4031 went to Vryheid Coronation Colliery as no. 5.

== Preservation ==
Number	Works nmr	THF / Private	Leaselend / Owner	Current Location
4003	BP 7170	THF		Witbank Locomotive Depot
4022	BP 7189	THF		Krugersdorp Locomotive Depot
4023	BP 7190	THF	Transnet Heritage Foundation	Outiniqua Transport Museum
