= 1926 in South Africa =

- Decades: 1900s; 1910s; 1920s; 1930s; 1940s
- See also: List of years in South Africa

The following lists events that happened during 1926 in South Africa.

== Incumbents ==
- Monarch: King George V.
- Governor-General and High Commissioner for Southern Africa: The Earl of Athlone.
- Prime Minister: James Barry Munnik Hertzog.
- Chief Justice: James Rose Innes.

== Events ==
March

- 13 – The first commercial air route from South Africa is established when Alan Cobham does a return flight between London and Cape Town.

October

- 8 – 124 coal miners die due to a methane explosion in the Durban Navigation Colliery disaster
- 10 – The South African National War Memorial next to Delville Wood outside Longueval, France is opened.
- 10 – The Sabie Game Reserve is renamed to Kruger National Park.

== Births ==
- 23 May – Joe Slovo, politician in Obeliai, Lithuania (d. 1995)
- 11 September; Gerrit Viljoen, government minister (d. 2009)
- 24 December – Ronald Draper, cricketer (d. 2025)

== Railways ==
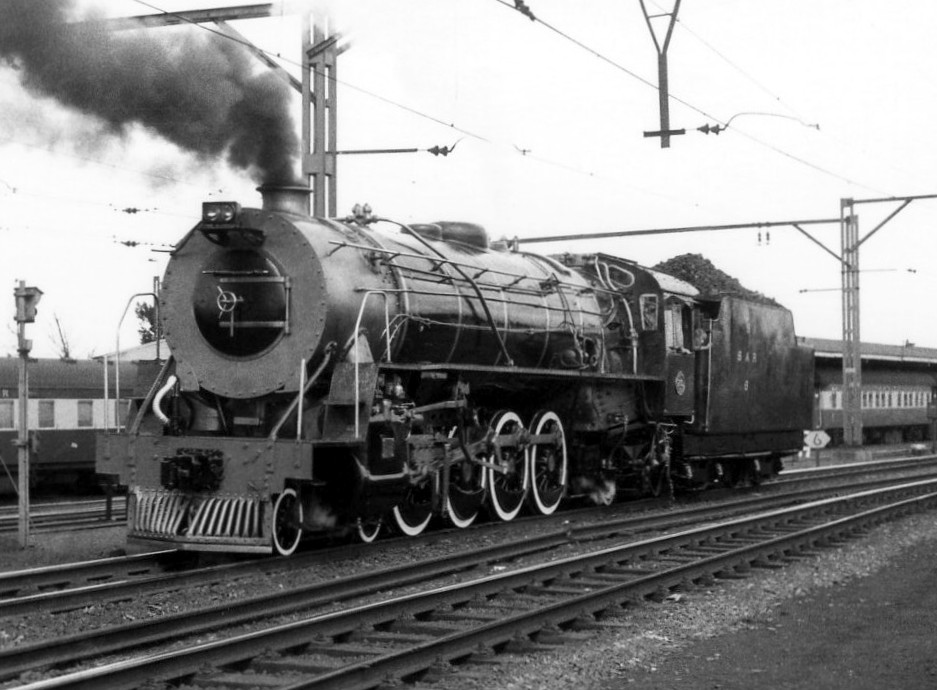
Class 15CA

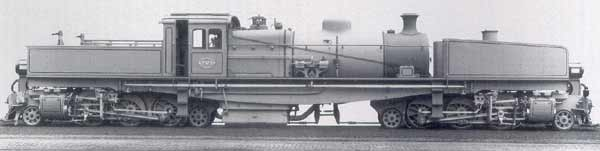
Class FD

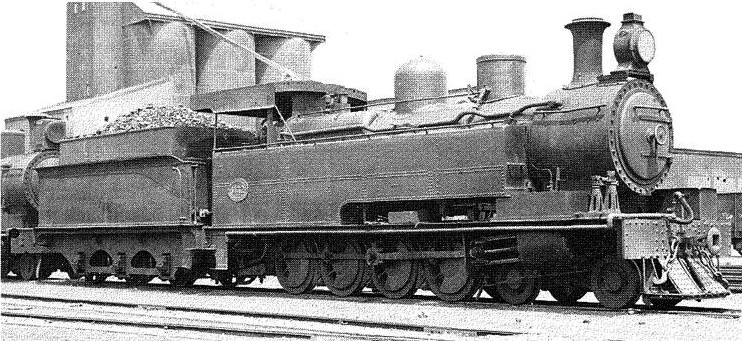
Class 17

=== Railway lines opened ===
- 18 January – Transvaal – Villiers, Free State to Grootvlei, 19 miles 39 chains (31.4 kilometres).
- 7 June – Free State – Harrismith to Warden, 35 miles 33 chains (57.0 kilometres).
- 18 August – Cape – Upington to Kakamas (Narrow gauge), 54 miles 63 chains (88.2 kilometres).
- 1 September – Cape – Addo to Sunland, 6 miles 1 chain (9.7 kilometres).
- 15 September – Natal – Mtubatuba to Candover, 110 miles 70 chains (178.4 kilometres).
- 19 November – Cape – Katberg to Seymour (Narrow gauge), 9 miles 30 chains (15.1 kilometres).
- 22 November – Transvaal – Citrus to Plaston, 17 miles 48 chains (28.3 kilometres).
- 8 December – Cape – Klawer to Landplaas, 50 miles 37 chains (81.2 kilometres).

=== Locomotives ===
Three Cape gauge locomotive types enter service on the South African Railways (SAR):

- The first twenty-three Class 15CA 4-8-2 Mountain type locomotives.
- Four Class FD 2-6-2+2-6-2 Modified Fairlie articulated steam locomotives.
- To address a shortage of suitable shunting locomotives, the first of twenty-one ex Natal Government Railways Class D1 4-8-2 tank locomotives are rebuilt to Class 17 4-8-0 tank-and-tender locomotives.
