= South African Class FD 2-6-2+2-6-2 =

1926 articulated steam locomotive

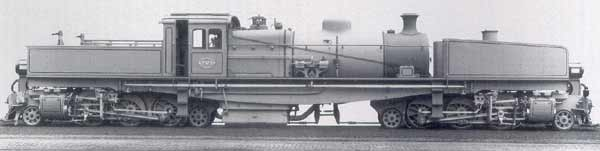
- Class FD no. 2323, later renumbered no. 674
Type and origin
- Power type: Steam
- Designer: North British Locomotive Company
- Builder: North British Locomotive Company
- Serial number: 23294-23297
- Model: Class FD
- Build date: 1925
- Total produced: 4
Specifications
- Configuration
  - Whyte: 2-6-2+2-6-2 (Double Prairie)
  - UIC: 1'C1'+1'C1'h4t
- Driver: 3rd & 4th coupled axles
- Gauge: 3 ft 6 in (1,067 mm) Cape gauge
- Leading dia.: 28 1/2 in (724 mm)
- Coupled dia.: 46 in (1,168 mm)
- Trailing dia.: 28 1/2 in (724 mm)
- Wheelbase: 58 ft 7 in (17,856 mm)
  - Engine: 18 ft 7 1/2 in (5,677 mm) each
  - Coupled: 8 ft 6 in (2,591 mm) each
- Pivot centres: 36 ft 6 in (11,125 mm)
- Length
  - Over couplers: 65 ft 7 3/4 in (20,009 mm)
- Height: 12 ft 9 1/4 in (3,893 mm)
- Frame type: Plate
- Axle load: 12 LT 7 cwt (12,550 kg)
  - Leading: 10 LT 11 cwt (10,720 kg) front 10 LT 4 cwt (10,360 kg) rear
  - 1st coupled: 12 LT 7 cwt (12,550 kg)
  - 2nd coupled: 12 LT 3 cwt (12,340 kg)
  - 3rd coupled: 12 LT 5 cwt (12,450 kg)
  - 4th coupled: 12 LT 1 cwt (12,240 kg)
  - 5th coupled: 12 LT (12,190 kg)
  - 6th coupled: 12 LT 1 cwt (12,240 kg)
  - Trailing: 10 LT 16 cwt (10,970 kg) front 9 LT 14 cwt (9,856 kg) rear
- Adhesive weight: 72 LT 17 cwt (74,020 kg)
- Loco weight: 114 LT 2 cwt (115,900 kg)
- Fuel type: Coal
- Fuel capacity: 5 LT (5.1 t)
- Water cap.: 2,500 imp gal (11,400 L) front 1,300 imp gal (5,910 L) rear
- Firebox
  - Type: Belpaire
  - Grate area: 41 sq ft (3.8 m^{2})
- Boiler
  - Pitch: 7 ft 6 1/4 in (2,292 mm)
  - Diameter: 6 ft (1,829 mm)
  - Tube plates: 10 ft 8 in (3,251 mm)
  - Small tubes: 190: 2 in (51 mm)
  - Large tubes: 32: 5 1/2 in (140 mm)
- Boiler pressure: 180 psi (1,241 kPa)
- Safety valve: Ramsbottom
- Heating surface
  - Firebox: 178 sq ft (16.5 m^{2})
  - Tubes: 1,552 sq ft (144.2 m^{2})
  - Total surface: 1,730 sq ft (161 m^{2})
- Superheater
  - Heating area: 371 sq ft (34.5 m^{2})
- Cylinders: Four
- Cylinder size: 15 in (381 mm) bore 24 in (610 mm) stroke
- Valve gear: Walschaerts
- Valve type: Piston
- Couplers: Johnston link-and-pin AAR knuckle (1930s)
Performance figures
- Tractive effort: 31,690 lbf (141.0 kN) @ 75%
Career
- Operators: South African Railways
- Class: Class FD
- Number in class: 4
- Numbers: 2320–2323, renumbered 671–674
- Delivered: 1926
- First run: 1926
- Withdrawn: 1949

The South African Railways Class FD 2-6-2+2-6-2 of 1926 was an articulated steam locomotive.

In 1926, the South African Railways placed four Class FD Modified Fairlie articulated steam locomotives with a 2-6-2+2-6-2 Double Prairie type wheel arrangement in service.

== Manufacturer ==
The Class FD Modified Fairlie locomotive was designed and built for the South African Railways (SAR) by the North British Locomotive Company in 1925, to the specifications of Colonel F.R. Collins DSO, Chief Mechanical Engineer of the SAR. Four locomotives were delivered in 1926, numbered in the range from 2320 to 2323. They were later renumbered in the range from 671 to 674.

== Characteristics ==
The Class FD was a heavier and more powerful version of the experimental Class FC which had been placed in service in 1925. It was the Modified Fairlie equivalent of the Class GD 2-6-2+2-6-2 Garratt which was similar in both size and mechanical respects, hence the Class FD designation of these Modified Fairlies. The FA and FB classifications were never used by the SAR. The Class FD locomotives had Walschaerts valve gear, plate frames and were superheated. They proved to be powerful locomotives and good steamers, but they were less successful than their Garratt equivalent.

== Shortcomings ==
They suffered from the same shortcomings as their Class FC predecessor. The 65 feet (19,812 millimetres) long rigid frame resulted in severe overhang on sharp curves and was also prone to metal fatigue and cracking, brought about by the long frame overhangs at the front and back beyond the engine unit pivot centres. The overhangs, laden with the water and coal bunkers of which about two-thirds of each extended beyond the respective pivot centres, tended to oscillate in an up-and-down motion while the locomotive was in motion.

In addition to this rather serious defect, the pivot bearings were also subject to quite rapid wear since they carried a considerable additional load compared to those on the Garratt as a result of the water and coal bunkers which were mounted on the main frame instead of on the engine units. This resulted in increased frequency of maintenance and as a consequence, increased operating cost.

== Service ==
The locomotives joined the sole Class FC in service on the Cape Midland System, working on the Grahamstown branch. They were scrapped by 1949.

The long rigid underframe of one of the Class FD locomotives was used to construct a footbridge across the single track at Poet's Corner Halt on the old Natal mainline between Pinetown and Rossburgh junction in Durban. The underframe forms the main girder of the footbridge.

== Illustration ==
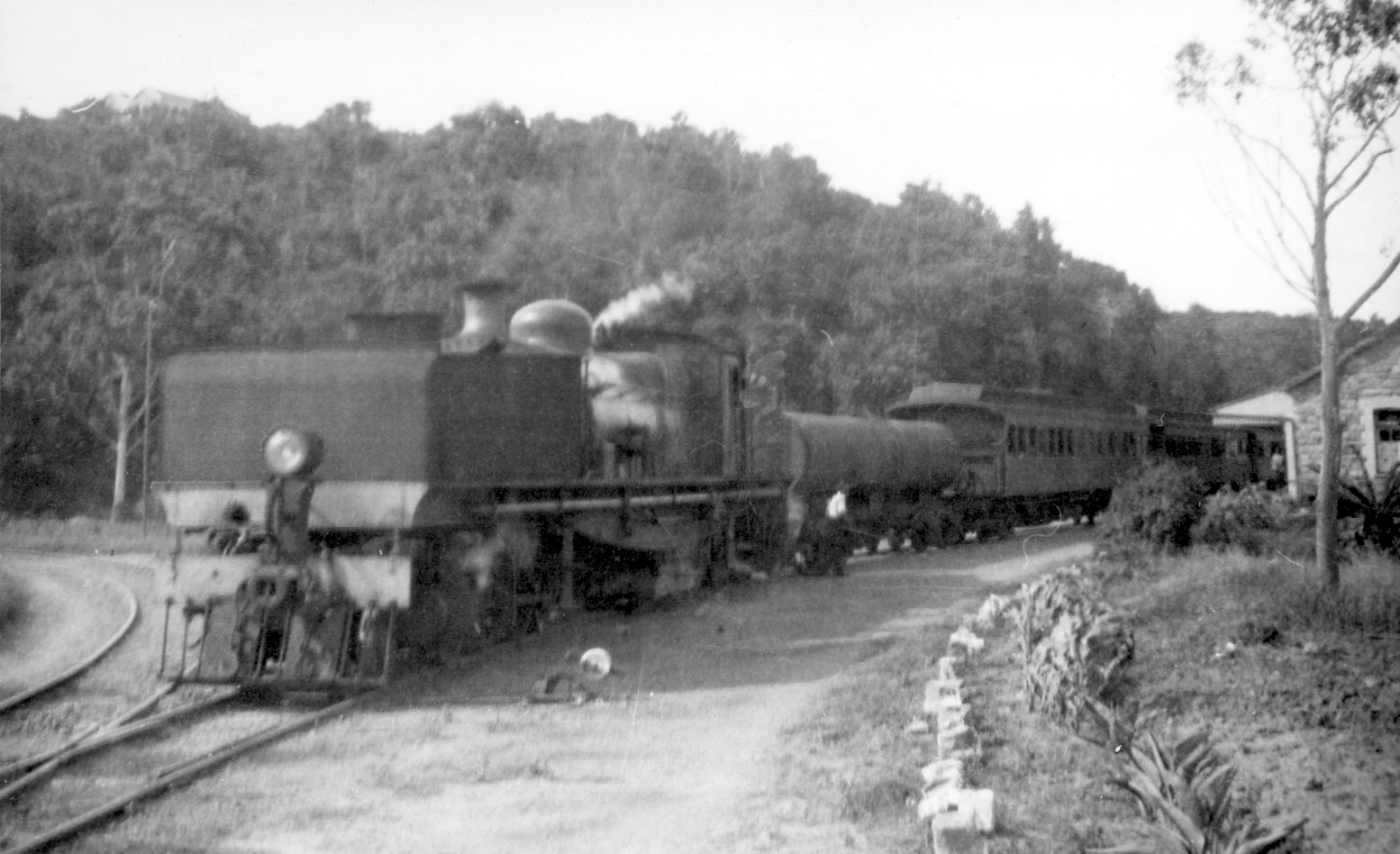
Class FD at Port Alfred, 3 September 1942
