= 2-8-2+2-8-2 =

Locomotive wheel arrangement

2-8-2+2-8-2 (Double Mikado)

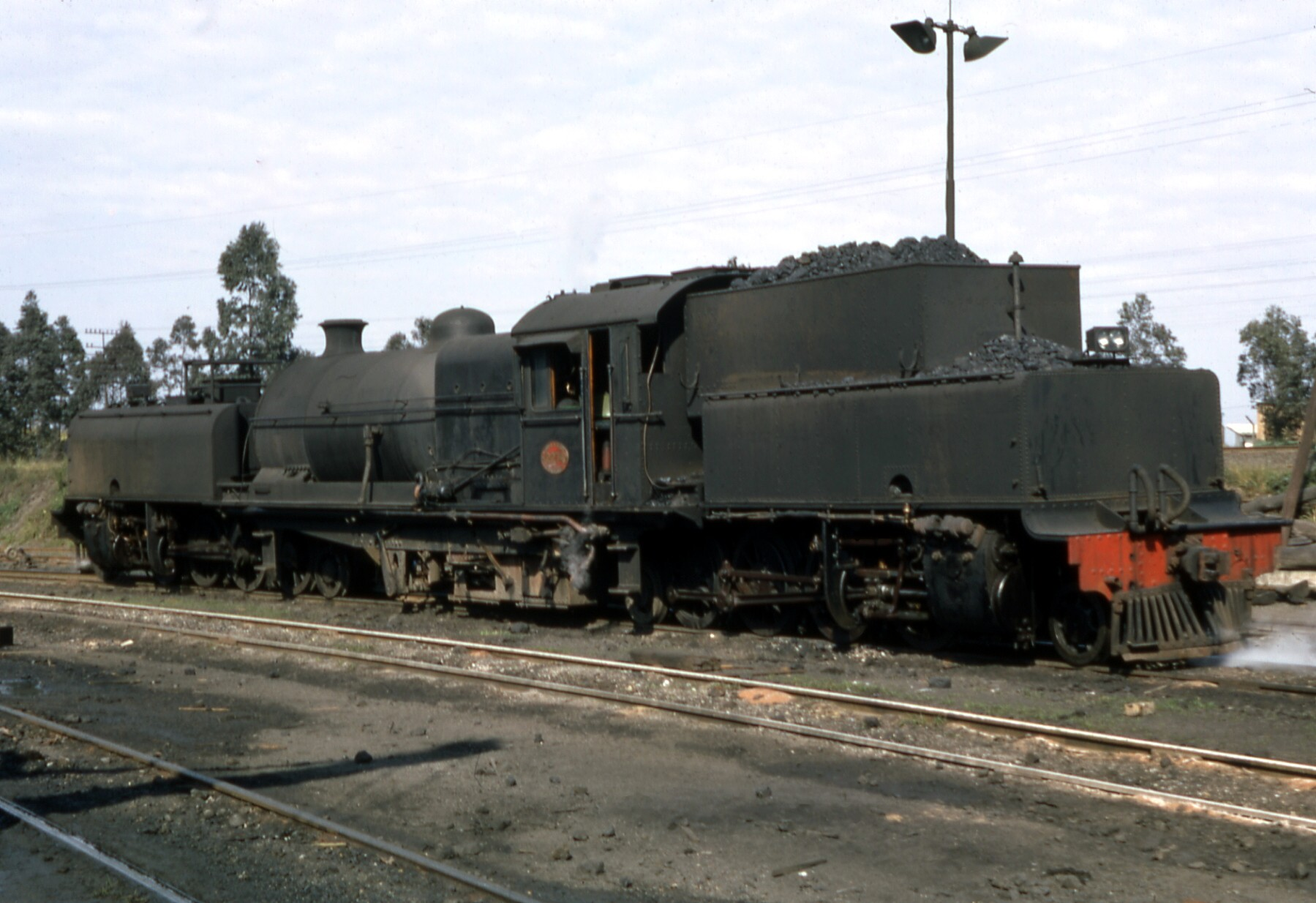
- SAR Class GE, c. 1966
Equivalent classifications
- UIC class: 1D1+1D1, 1'D1'+1'D1'
- French class: 141+141
- Turkish class: 46+46
- Swiss class: 4/6+4/6, 8/12 from 1920s
- Russian class: 1-4-1+1-4-1
First known tank engine version
- First use: 1924
- Country: South Africa
- Locomotive: SAR Class GE
- Railway: South African Railways
- Designer: Beyer, Peacock & Company
- Builder: Beyer, Peacock & Company

Under the Whyte notation for the classification of steam locomotives by wheel arrangement, a 2-8-2+2-8-2 is an articulated locomotive using a pair of 2-8-2 power units back to back, with the boiler and cab suspended between them. The 2-8-2 wheel arrangement has a single pair of leading wheels in a leading truck, followed by four coupled pairs of driving wheels and a pair of trailing wheels in a trailing truck. Since the 2-8-2 type was known as Mikado, the corresponding Garratt and Modified Fairlie types were usually known as Double Mikado.

== Overview ==
The 2-8-2+2-8-2 wheel arrangement was used by Garratt and Modified Fairlie locomotives.

=== Garratt locomotives ===
The Double Mikado was the fourth most common Garratt type, with 144 examples constructed, 114 built by Garratt patent owner Beyer, Peacock & Company and 30 built by others under license. Only 10, six for Chile and four for Peru, were built to 4 ft 8 1/2 in (1,435 mm) standard gauge. Ninety were built to 3 ft 6 in (1,067 mm) Cape gauge for a number of different African railways. For Spain, sixteen were built to 1,672 mm (5 ft 5 13/16 in) gauge.

2-8-2+2-8-2 Garratt production list – All manufacturers
Gauge	Railway	Class	Works no.	Units	Year	Builder
1,000 mm	C.F. Franco Ethiopien & Libya		1371-1376	6	1939	Ansaldo, Italy
1,000 mm	War Department, India/Burma		7122-7135	14	1944	Beyer, Peacock & Company
1,000 mm	Royal State Railways of Thailand		21618-21623	6	1929	Henschel & Son
1,000 mm	Royal State Railways of Thailand		23109-23110	2	1936	Henschel & Son
3 ft 6 in	Sierra Leone Development Corporation		6786	1	1937	Beyer, Peacock & Company
3 ft 6 in	Sierra Leone Development Corporation		6842	1	1937	Beyer, Peacock & Company
3 ft 6 in	South African Railways	GE	6193-6198	6	1924	Beyer, Peacock & Company
3 ft 6 in	South African Railways	GE	6339-6348	10	1927	Beyer, Peacock & Company
3 ft 6 in	Rhodesia Railways		6562-6569	8	1929-30	Beyer, Peacock & Company
3 ft 6 in	South African Railways	GE	6716-6717	2	1930	Beyer, Peacock & Company
3 ft 6 in	Sierra Leone Development Corporation		6726-6727	2	1931	Beyer, Peacock & Company
3 ft 6 in	Rhodesia Railways		6877-6882	6	1938	Beyer, Peacock & Company
3 ft 6 in	Rhodesia Railways		6899-6904	6	1937	Beyer, Peacock & Company
3 ft 6 in	War Department, Congo/Gold Coast/Rhodesia		7057-7074	18	1943	Beyer, Peacock & Company
3 ft 6 in	Rhodesia Railways		7498-7527	30	1953	Beyer, Peacock & Company
4 ft 8 1/2 in	Central of Peru		6731	1	1931	Beyer, Peacock & Company
4 ft 8 1/2 in	Nitrate Railways, Chile		6291-6293	3	1926	Beyer, Peacock & Company
4 ft 8 1/2 in	Nitrate Railways, Chile		6481-6483	3	1928	Beyer, Peacock & Company
4 ft 8 1/2 in	Central of Peru		6626-6628	3	1930	Beyer, Peacock & Company
5 ft 6 in	Central of Aragon, Spain		402-407	6	1931	Babcock & Wilcox, Spain
5 ft 6 in	Renfe, Spain		730-739	10	1960	Babcock & Wilcox, Spain

=== Modified Fairlie locomotives ===
The South African Railways (SAR), where the Modified Fairlie concept was conceived as a possible alternative to the Garratt, was the only user. The Modified Fairlie was essentially an adaptation of the Kitson-Meyer concept. It was similar in appearance to a Garratt, but with the boiler, cab, coal and water bunkers all mounted on a single rigid frame which pivoted on the engine units, with the pivot centers located approximately at the centre of the rigid wheelbase of each engine unit. In the Garratt design, by comparison, the coal and water bunkers are mounted directly on the engine units and swivel with them, while the boiler, firebox and cab are mounted on a rigid frame which is suspended between the two engine units.

== Usage ==
=== South Africa ===
Between 1925 and 1931, the SAR placed eighteen 3 ft 6 in (1,067 mm) Cape gauge Class GE Garratts in service, all built by Beyer, Peacock & Company between 1924 and 1930. The first six entered service in 1925 and proved so successful that a second order for ten was placed in 1926. Another two locomotives entered service in 1931. All of them had Belpaire fireboxes, plate frames, Walschaerts valve gear and were superheated. The locomotive was an enlargement of the Class GD 2-6-2+2-6-2 Double Prairie and was designed as a heavy goods locomotive for use on light 60 pounds per yard (30 kilograms per metre) rail. They were the first eight-coupled Garratts to be built for the SAR and, on a tractive effort basis at the time of their introduction, they were the most powerful locomotives operating on light track in Africa and the Southern Hemisphere.

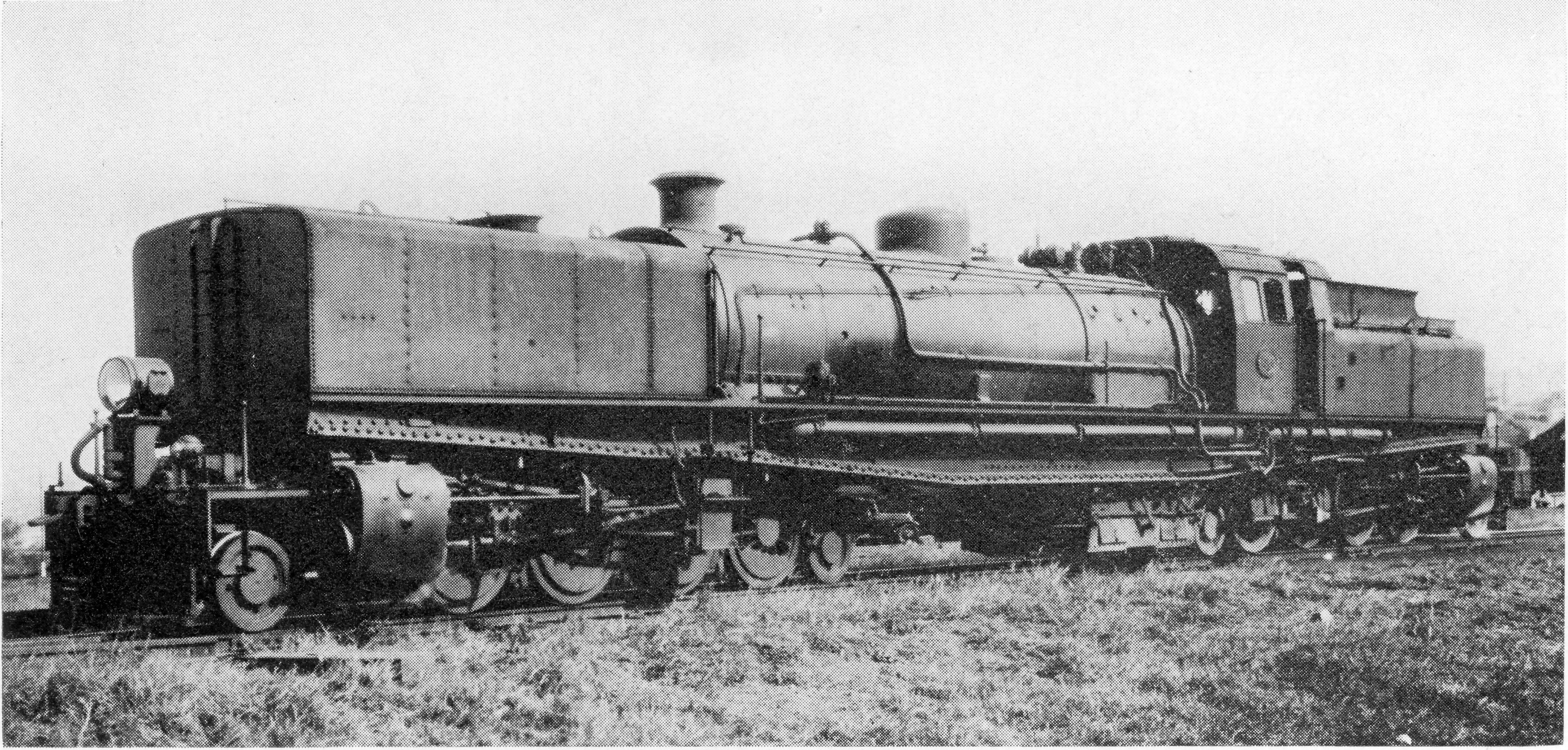
SAR Class HF no. 1386, c. 1950

In 1927, the SAR placed ten Class HF Modified Fairlie Double Mikados in service, followed by an eleventh one in 1928. The locomotive was designed by the SAR under the direction of Colonel F.R. Collins DSO, SAR Chief Mechanical Engineer from 1922 to 1929, and was built by Henschel & Son in 1926 and 1927, hence the designation of Class HF for "Henschel Fairlie". Designed for mainline work, it was the Modified Fairlie equivalent of the Class GE Garratt which was similar in both size and mechanical respects. It had Walschaerts valve gear, a bar frame and was superheated, with a round-topped firebox.

The Class HF proved to be a powerful locomotive, but it was less successful than its Garratt equivalent. The pivot bearings were subject to quite rapid wear since they carried a considerable additional load compared to those on the Garratt, as a result of the water and coal bunkers which were mounted on the main frame instead of on the engine units. This resulted in increased maintenance and, as a consequence, increased operating cost. No more locomotives of the Modified Fairlie design were acquired by the SAR.
