= South African Class GE 2-8-2+2-8-2 =

1925 articulated steam locomotive

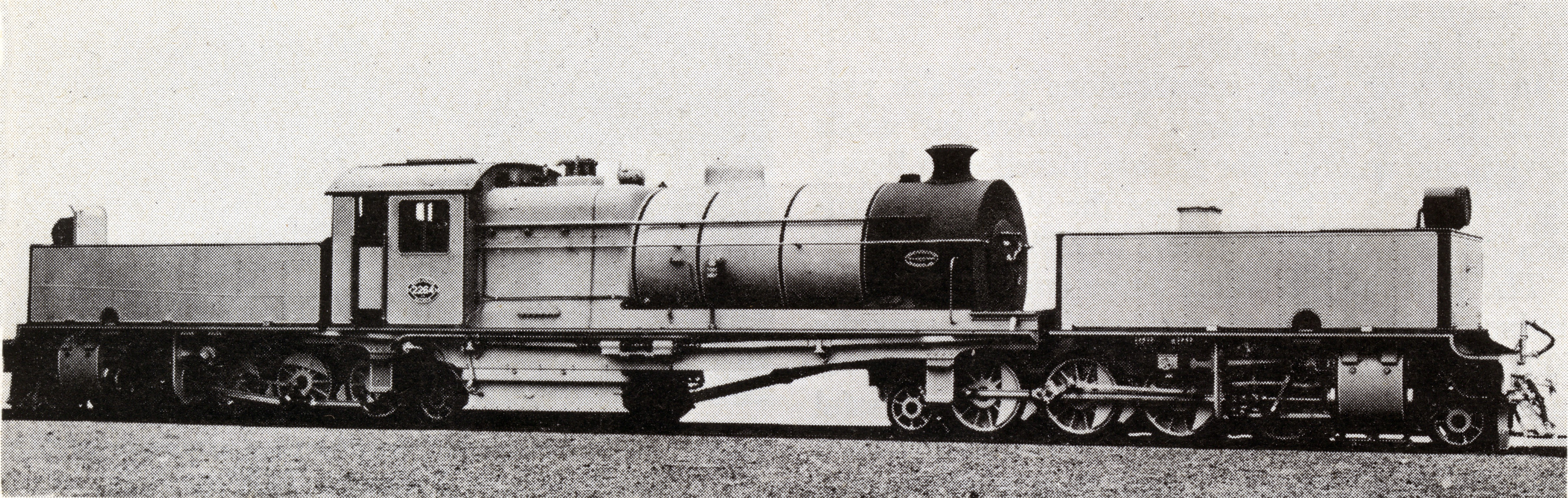
- First batch Class GE no. 2264, c. 1924
Type and origin
- ♠ Engine numbers 2260-2275 ♥ Engine numbers 2276 & 2277 ♣ Engine numbers 2260-2265 ♦ Engine numbers 2266-2275
- Power type: Steam
- Designer: Beyer, Peacock & Company
- Builder: Beyer, Peacock & Company
- Serial number: 6193–6198, 6339–6348, 6716–6717
- Model: Class GE
- Build date: 1924–1930
- Total produced: 18
Specifications
- Configuration
  - Whyte: 2-8-2+2-8-2 (Double Mikado)
  - UIC: 1'D1'+1'D1'h4
- Driver: 3rd & 5th coupled axles
- Gauge: 3 ft 6 in (1,067 mm) Cape gauge
- Leading dia.: 28 1/2 in (724 mm)
- Coupled dia.: 45 1/2 in (1,156 mm) as built 46 in (1,168 mm) retyred
- Trailing dia.: 28 1/2 in (724 mm)
- Wheelbase: 70 ft (21,336 mm)
  - Engine: ♠ 22 ft 10 1/2 in (6,972 mm) each ♥ 22 ft 11 in (6,985 mm) each
  - Coupled: 12 ft 9 in (3,886 mm) each
- Pivot centres: 35 ft (10,668 mm)
- Length
  - Over couplers: ♠ 76 ft 8 3/4 in (23,387 mm) ♥ 76 ft 8 1/4 in (23,374 mm)
- Height: 12 ft 11 11/16 in (3,954 mm)
- Frame type: Plate
- Axle load: ♠ 13 LT 9 cwt (13,670 kg) ♥ 13 LT 3 cwt (13,360 kg)
  - Leading: ♠ 11 LT 4 cwt (11,380 kg) front 11 LT (11,180 kg) rear ♥ 11 LT 2 cwt (11,280 kg) front 11 LT 10 cwt (11,680 kg) rear
  - 1st coupled: ♠ 12 LT 6 cwt (12,500 kg) ♥ 12 LT 3 cwt (12,340 kg)
  - 2nd coupled: ♠ 13 LT 1 cwt (13,260 kg) ♥ 13 LT 3 cwt (13,360 kg)
  - 3rd coupled: ♠ 12 LT 19 cwt (13,160 kg) ♥ 13 LT 1 cwt (13,260 kg)
  - 4th coupled: ♠ 12 LT 19 cwt (13,160 kg) ♥ 13 LT 1 cwt (13,260 kg)
  - 5th coupled: ♠ 13 LT 7 cwt (13,560 kg) ♥ 12 LT 18 cwt (13,110 kg)
  - 6th coupled: ♠ 13 LT 7 cwt (13,560 kg) ♥ 12 LT 18 cwt (13,110 kg)
  - 7th coupled: ♠ 13 LT 9 cwt (13,670 kg) ♥ 13 LT (13,210 kg)
  - 8th coupled: ♠ 12 LT 2 cwt (12,290 kg) ♥ 12 LT 11 cwt (12,750 kg)
  - Trailing: ♠ 11 LT 3 cwt (11,330 kg) front 11 LT 11 cwt (11,740 kg) rear ♥ 11 LT 7 cwt (11,530 kg) front 11 LT 4 cwt (11,380 kg) rear
- Adhesive weight: ♠ 103 LT 10 cwt (105,200 kg) ♥ 102 LT 15 cwt (104,400 kg)
- Loco weight: ♠ 148 LT 8 cwt (150,800 kg) ♥ 147 LT 18 cwt (150,300 kg)
- Fuel type: Coal
- Fuel capacity: 9 LT (9.1 t)
- Water cap.: 3,300 imp gal (15,000 L) front 1,300 imp gal (5,910 L) rear
- Firebox
  - Type: Belpaire
  - Grate area: 52 sq ft (4.8 m^{2})
- Boiler
  - Pitch: 7 ft 9 1/4 in (2,369 mm)
  - Diameter: 6 ft 9 in (2,057 mm)
  - Tube plates: 11 ft 3 in (3,429 mm)
  - Small tubes: 288: 2 in (51 mm)
  - Large tubes: 36: 5 1/2 in (140 mm)
- Boiler pressure: 180 psi (1,241 kPa)
- Safety valve: Ramsbottom
- Heating surface
  - Firebox: ♣ 215 sq ft (20.0 m^{2}) ♦♥ 202 sq ft (18.8 m^{2})
  - Tubes: 2,374 sq ft (220.552 m^{2})
  - Arch tubes: ♥ 27 sq ft (2.5 m^{2})
  - Total surface: ♣ 2,589 sq ft (240.5 m^{2}) ♦ 2,576 sq ft (239.3 m^{2}) ♥ 2,603 sq ft (241.8 m^{2})
- Superheater
  - Heating area: ♣ 362 sq ft (33.6 m^{2}) ♦ 349 sq ft (32.4 m^{2}) ♥ 364 sq ft (33.8 m^{2})
- Cylinders: 4
- Cylinder size: ♠ 18 in (457 mm) bore ♥ 19 in (483 mm) bore ♠♥ 24 in (610 mm) stroke
- Valve gear: Walschaerts
- Valve type: Piston
- Couplers: Johnston link-and-pin AAR knuckle (1930s)
Performance figures
- Tractive effort: ♠ 45,640 lbf (203.0 kN) @ 75% ♥ 50,850 lbf (226.2 kN) @ 75%
Career
- Operators: South African Railways
- Class: Class GE
- Number in class: 18
- Numbers: 2260–2277
- Delivered: 1925–1931
- First run: 1925
- Withdrawn: 1975

The South African Railways Class GE 2-8-2+2-8-2 of 1925 was an articulated steam locomotive.

Between 1925 and 1931, the South African Railways placed 18 Class GE Garratt articulated locomotives with a 2-8-2+2-8-2 Double Mikado type wheel arrangement in service. They were built in three batches over six years.

== Manufacturer ==
In 1924, specifications were prepared by F.R. Collins, chief mechanical engineer of the South African Railways (SAR), for the Class GE 2-8-2+2-8-2 Double Mikado type Garratt locomotive. An order was placed with Beyer, Peacock & Company for the design and construction of six locomotives.

They were delivered during March 1925, numbered in the range from 2260 to 2265 and erected in the Salvokop workshops in Pretoria. The Class GE was the only purebred Garratt Double Mikado type to see service on the SAR.

The locomotives proved to be most successful and a second order for ten engines was placed with Beyer, Peacock & Company in 1926. These were placed in traffic during November of that year, numbered in the range from 2266 to 2275.

A third order for two locomotives, also from Beyer, Peacock & Company, followed in 1930, numbered 2276 and 2277 and placed in service in February 1931.

== Characteristics ==
The Class GE Garratt was designed as a heavy goods locomotive for use on light 60 pounds per yard (30 kilograms per metre) rail. It was an enlarged version of the Class GD 2-6-2+2-6-2 Double Prairie type. The Class GE were the first eight-coupled Garratts to be built for the SAR and at the time of their introduction, they were the most powerful locomotives in respect of tractive effort operating on light track in Africa and the Southern Hemisphere.

They had plate frames, steel Belpaire fireboxes and were superheated, with four safety valves set at 180 pounds per square inch (1,241 kilopascals). Their piston valves were actuated by Walschaerts valve gear, controlled by steam reversing gear. As delivered, they had 45 1/2 inches (1,156 millimetres) diameter coupled wheels which were later retyred to 46 inches (1,168 millimetres) diameter.

The two water tanks had a combined capacity of 4,600 imperial gallons (20,900 litres). They had a water-filling tube hole on the front tank only since the front and rear tanks were connected by leveling pipes in accordance with the usual Garratt practice. The locomotives were delivered with mechanical lubricators, but these were later removed.

The locomotives of the three orders were visually distinguishable from one another. The first two orders were mechanically identical, but the second batch had redesigned water tanks with rounded top corners and inset tops on their coal bunkers to improve rearward vision for the crew. They also had slightly smaller firebox and superheater heating areas than the engines of the first batch.

The two locomotives of the third batch were similar in general appearance to those of the second batch, but were 10 long hundredweight (508 kilograms) lighter than the engines of the first two batches. They had arch tubes added in the firebox, wider cabs and 1 inch (25 millimetres) larger bore cylinders which made them more powerful. Their engine units had a 1/2 inch (13 millimetres) longer wheelbase.

== Service ==
They were placed in service working goods traffic on the light rail sections between Zeerust and Mafeking and between Pretoria and Pietersburg. Some were later allocated to the Natal North Coast, shedded at Stanger and Empangeni and employed on freight traffic. In 1972, no. 2262 was the last steam locomotive to undergo a complete overhaul at the Durban Mechanical Workshops.

A few were used for a brief period to work across the Montagu Pass between George and Oudtshoorn. Their final duties were on the Nkwalini branch in Natal, where the last survivors of the original eighteen locomotives were finally replaced by Class GEA and Class GO Garratts. The last ten Class GE locomotives were withdrawn from service in April 1975.

== Knuckle couplers ==
From 1927, the SAR began to convert the couplers of its Cape Gauge rolling stock from the Johnston link-and-pin coupling system, which had been in use since the establishment of the Cape Government Railways in 1873, to AAR knuckle couplers. Conversion of all rolling stock was to take three decades and both coupler types could still be seen on rolling stock into the late 1950s.

Of the locomotives depicted, no. 2269 has the older Johnston link-and-pin type couplers. The coupler on no. 2274 is one of the transition period knuckle couplers with a horizontal gap and a vertical hole in the knuckle itself to accommodate, respectively, a link and a pin to enable the locomotive to couple to rolling stock which was still equipped with the older link-and-pin type couplers.

== Preservation ==
In September 2017, surviving locomotive 2260, last used in the early 1970s, was moved from Millsite to Bloemfontein for preservation as part of the THF A list.
