= Franklin, KwaZulu-Natal =

Franklin
- Location within KwaZulu-Natal Location within South Africa
- Coordinates: 30.320°S 29.454°E
- Country: South Africa
- Province: KwaZulu-Natal
- District: Harry Gwala
- Municipality: Greater Kokstad

Area
  - Total: 6.89 km^{2} (2.66 sq mi)

Population (2011)
  - Total: 2,018
  - Density: 293/km^{2} (759/sq mi)

Racial makeup (2011)
  - Black African: 96.0%
  - Coloured: 2.3%
  - White: 1.7%

First languages (2011)
  - Xhosa: 66.8%
  - Zulu: 16.7%
  - Sotho: 9.6%
  - Afrikaans: 2.9%
  - Other: 4.0%
- Time zone: UTC+2 (SAST)
- PO box: 4706
- Area code: 039

Franklin is a town in Greater Kokstad Local Municipality in the KwaZulu-Natal province of South Africa.
