= South African Class FC 2-6-2+2-6-2 =

1925 articulated steam locomotive

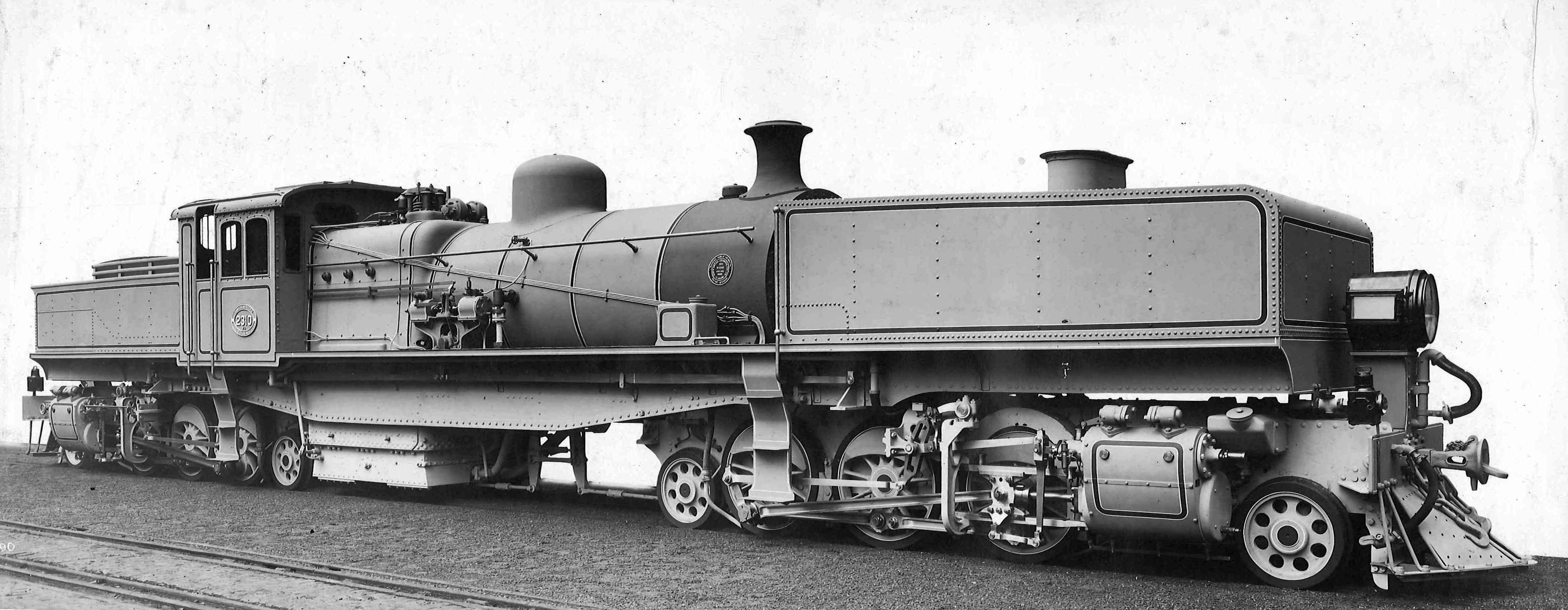
- Class FC no. 2310, later renumbered 670, c. 1925
Type and origin
- Power type: Steam
- Designer: North British Locomotive Company
- Builder: North British Locomotive Company
- Serial number: 23140
- Model: Class FC
- Build date: 1924
- Total produced: 1
Specifications
- Configuration
  - Whyte: 2-6-2+2-6-2 (Double Prairie)
  - UIC: 1'C1'+1'C1'h4
- Driver: 3rd & 4th coupled axles
- Gauge: 3 ft 6 in (1,067 mm) Cape gauge
- Leading dia.: 28 1/2 in (724 mm)
- Coupled dia.: 42 3/4 in (1,086 mm)
- Trailing dia.: 28 1/2 in (724 mm)
- Wheelbase: 56 ft 8 in (17,272 mm)
  - Engine: 17 ft 8 1/4 in (5,391 mm) each
  - Coupled: 8 ft (2,438 mm) each
- Pivot centres: 35 ft 8 in (10,871 mm)
- Length
  - Over couplers: 63 ft 9 in (19,431 mm)
- Height: 12 ft 3 in (3,734 mm)
- Frame type: Plate
- Axle load: 10 LT 10 cwt (10,670 kg)
  - Leading: 9 LT 11 cwt (9,703 kg) front 9 LT 2 cwt (9,246 kg) rear
  - 1st coupled: 10 LT 10 cwt (10,670 kg)
  - 2nd coupled: 10 LT 10 cwt (10,670 kg)
  - 3rd coupled: 10 LT 10 cwt (10,670 kg)
  - 4th coupled: 10 LT 10 cwt (10,670 kg)
  - 5th coupled: 10 LT 8 cwt (10,570 kg)
  - 6th coupled: 10 LT 10 cwt (10,670 kg)
  - Trailing: 9 LT 4 cwt (9,348 kg) front 8 LT 19 cwt (9,094 kg) rear
- Adhesive weight: 62 LT 18 cwt (63,910 kg)
- Loco weight: 99 LT 14 cwt (101,300 kg)
- Fuel type: Coal
- Fuel capacity: 5 LT (5.1 t)
- Water cap.: 2,080 imp gal (9,460 L) front 920 imp gal (4,180 L) rear
- Firebox
  - Type: Belpaire
  - Grate area: 34 sq ft (3.2 m^{2})
- Boiler
  - Pitch: 7 ft 3 in (2,210 mm)
  - Diameter: 5 ft 1 3/4 in (1,568 mm)
  - Tube plates: 11 ft 3 3/8 in (3,439 mm)
  - Small tubes: 143: 2 in (51 mm)
  - Large tubes: 24: 5 1/2 in (140 mm)
- Boiler pressure: 180 psi (1,241 kPa)
- Safety valve: Ramsbottom
- Heating surface
  - Firebox: 155 sq ft (14.4 m^{2})
  - Tubes: 1,232 sq ft (114.5 m^{2})
  - Total surface: 1,387 sq ft (128.9 m^{2})
- Superheater
  - Heating area: 280 sq ft (26 m^{2})
- Cylinders: Four
- Cylinder size: 14 in (356 mm) bore 23 in (584 mm) stroke
- Valve gear: Walschaerts
- Valve type: Piston
- Couplers: Johnston link-and-pin
Performance figures
- Tractive effort: 28,470 lbf (126.6 kN) @ 75%
Career
- Operators: South African Railways
- Class: Class FC
- Number in class: 1
- Numbers: 2310, renumbered 670
- Delivered: 1925
- First run: 1925
- Withdrawn: 1939

The South African Railways Class FC 2-6-2+2-6-2 of 1925 was an articulated steam locomotive.

In 1925, the South African Railways placed a single experimental Class FC Modified Fairlie articulated steam locomotive with a 2-6-2+2-6-2 Double Prairie type wheel arrangement in service.

== Manufacturer ==
To obtain experience with another type of articulated locomotive similar to the Garratt design, Colonel F.R. Collins DSO, Chief Mechanical Engineer of the South African Railways (SAR), was authorised to experiment with a modified type of Fairlie locomotive. The sole experimental Class FC 2-6-2+2-6-2 Double Prairie type Modified Fairlie locomotive was designed and built for the SAR by the North British Locomotive Company in 1924. It was numbered 2310 upon delivery during February 1925, but it was later renumbered to 670.

== The Fairlie locomotive ==
The Fairlie locomotive was invented and patented in 1864 by the Scottish engineer Robert Francis Fairlie.

=== Double Fairlie ===
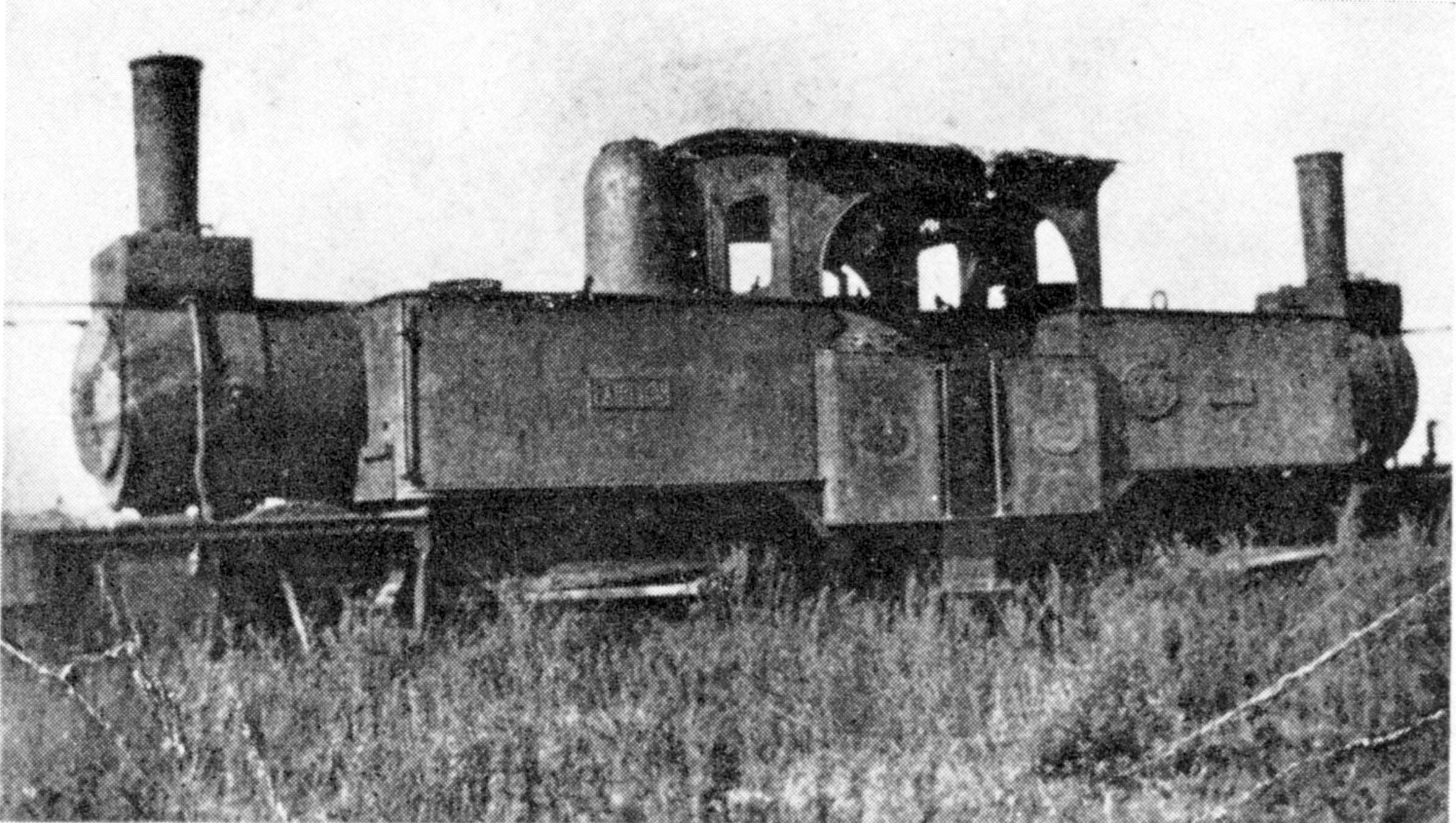
Cape Government Railways Double Fairlie, c. 1888

The first Fairlie locomotives later became known as Double Fairlies. In general appearance, most of them were reminiscent of the German-built Zwillinge which saw service on the narrow gauge lines in German South West Africa and other German territories. However, while the Zwillinge were pairs of individual locomotives which were semi-permanently coupled back-to-back, the Double Fairlie was a single locomotive with either a double-ended boiler or two separate boilers with smokeboxes at each end, a central firebox and a central cab, all mounted on one rigid frame. It ran on two swiveling engine units or powered bogies similar to those of a Garratt locomotive, with the cylinders on each engine unit at the respective locomotive ends. Couplers, buffers and, where they were in use, cowcatchers were mounted on the engine units so that they could more accurately follow the curvature of the track.

=== Single Fairlie ===
A variation of the Fairlie concept was the Single Fairlie, also known as the Mason Fairlie. The Single Fairlie design was essentially half a Double Fairlie. It retained the ability to negotiate sharp curves and while it abandoned the bidirectional nature of the Double Fairlie, it regained the ability of conventional locomotives to have a large water and coal bunker behind the cab and to use a trailing tender if necessary.

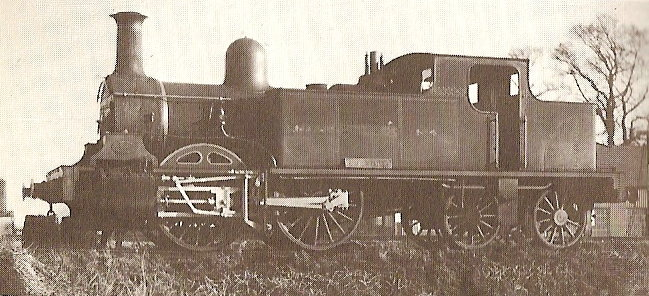
Swindon Marlborough & Andover Railway Single Fairlie, c. 1878

Early Single Fairlies were similar in appearance to regular tank locomotives. The whole engine and bunker or tender combination was mounted on a single rigid frame as on the conventional tank engine, but it differed by virtue of the fact that a pivoting engine unit was mounted under the boiler and an unpowered bogie under the bunker or tender.

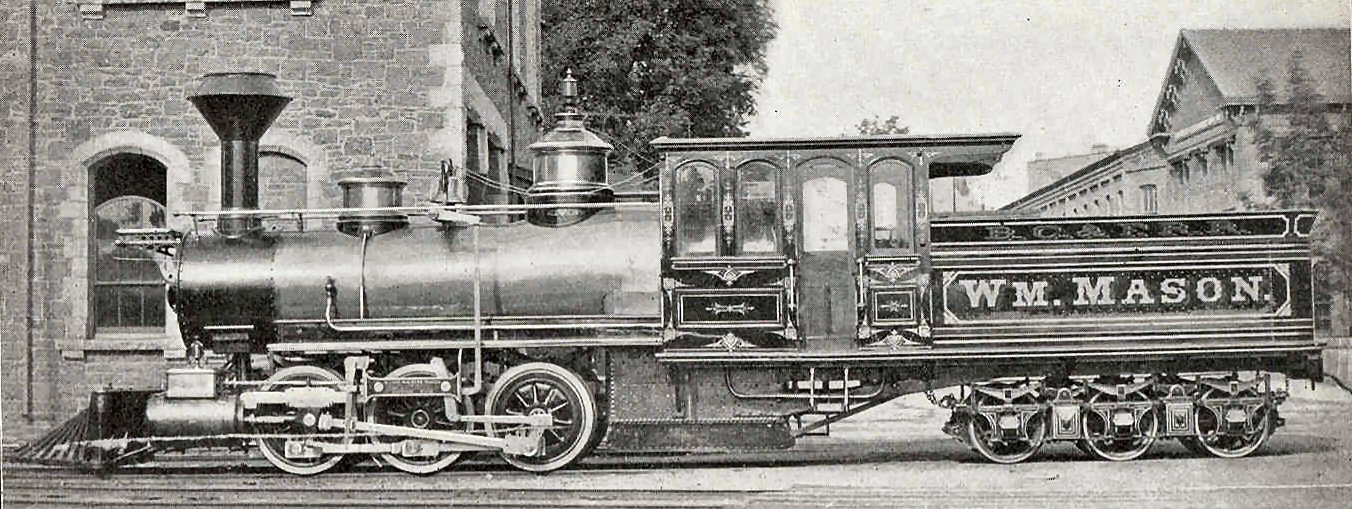
Mason Bogie Single Fairlie, c. 1874

Later models were similar in appearance to conventional tender locomotives. It was developed by William Mason in the United States, where the type became known as the Mason Bogie. It had one boiler, a cab and bunker at one end, a single engine unit or powered bogie under the boiler and an unpowered bogie under the cab and bunker. The illustration shows a Mason Bogie with an 0-6-6 wheel arrangement.

=== Modified Fairlie ===
The first Modified Fairlie was introduced in South Africa and was viewed as a competitor and alternative to the Garratt type. Colonel Collins displayed a distinct preference for articulated locomotives and the Modified Fairlie was acquired as an experimental locomotive in 1925 to compare its concept to that of the Garratt locomotive in terms of actual performance and maintenance requirements.

The Class FC Modified Fairlie was, in essence, an adaptation of the Kitson-Meyer concept. It was similar in appearance to a Garratt, but with the boiler, cab, coal and water bunkers all mounted on a single rigid frame which extended almost over the full length of the locomotive. This superstructure was supported on two engine units by means of pivots. The pivot centres were located approximately at the centre of the coupled wheelbase of each engine unit. In the Garratt design, by comparison, the coal and water bunkers are mounted directly on the engine units and pivot with them, while the boiler, firebox and cab are mounted on a rigid cradle frame which is suspended between the two engine units.

On the Modified Fairlie, as compared to the Double Fairlie, the distance between the engine units had been increased to a figure similar to that of the Garratt type, thereby allowing space between them for a liberal firebox and ashpan. This resulted in a more efficient boiler and also distributed the weight of the engine over a greater length than was obtainable with an orthodox Double Fairlie design. It was claimed that the Modified Fairlie arrangement reduced the wear between wheel flanges and rails and that the distribution of the loads on the axles as fuel and water was expended was less variable than could be obtained with the Garratt design.

== Characteristics ==
The superheated Class FC had 7-inch (178-millimetre) diameter piston valves actuated by Walschaerts valve gear, and a 7/8 inch (22 millimetres) thick plate frame. The aim with the experimental locomotive was to compare the performance and maintenance requirements of the Modified Fairlie to that of a Garratt, in particular to the Class GC 2-6-2+2-6-2 Double Prairie type Garratt which was similar in both size and mechanical respects. Hence, also, the experimental Modified Fairlie's Class FC designation, skipping the FA and FB classifications which were never used by the SAR.

== Service ==
The locomotive was placed in service on the Cape Midlands System. While it gave good service, it was not outstanding and proved to be not as successful as the Garratt. The 63-foot-long (19.2-metre) frame resulted in severe overhang on sharp curves. The heavily laden overhangs beyond the pivots also led to metal fatigue due to its tendency to oscillate up-and-down. The pivot bearings were also subject to quite rapid wear, since they carried a considerable additional load compared to those on the Garratt as a result of the water and coal bunkers which were mounted on the long main frame instead of on the engine units. These factors resulted in increased frequency of maintenance and, as a consequence, increased operating cost.

No more of the Class FC locomotive was ordered. The sole locomotive was scrapped in 1939, after a comparatively short service life of only fourteen years.

A 1/12th scale model of the Class FC was built by Twinning Models Ltd. and displayed at the Museum of Transport in Glasgow.

== Illustration ==
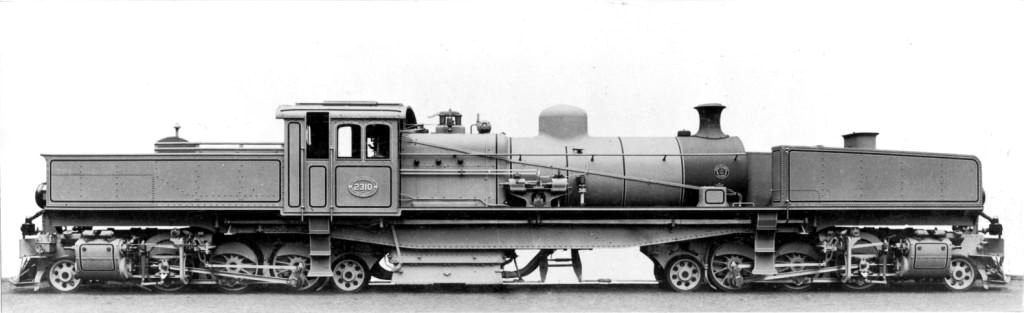
Builder's works picture of no. 2310

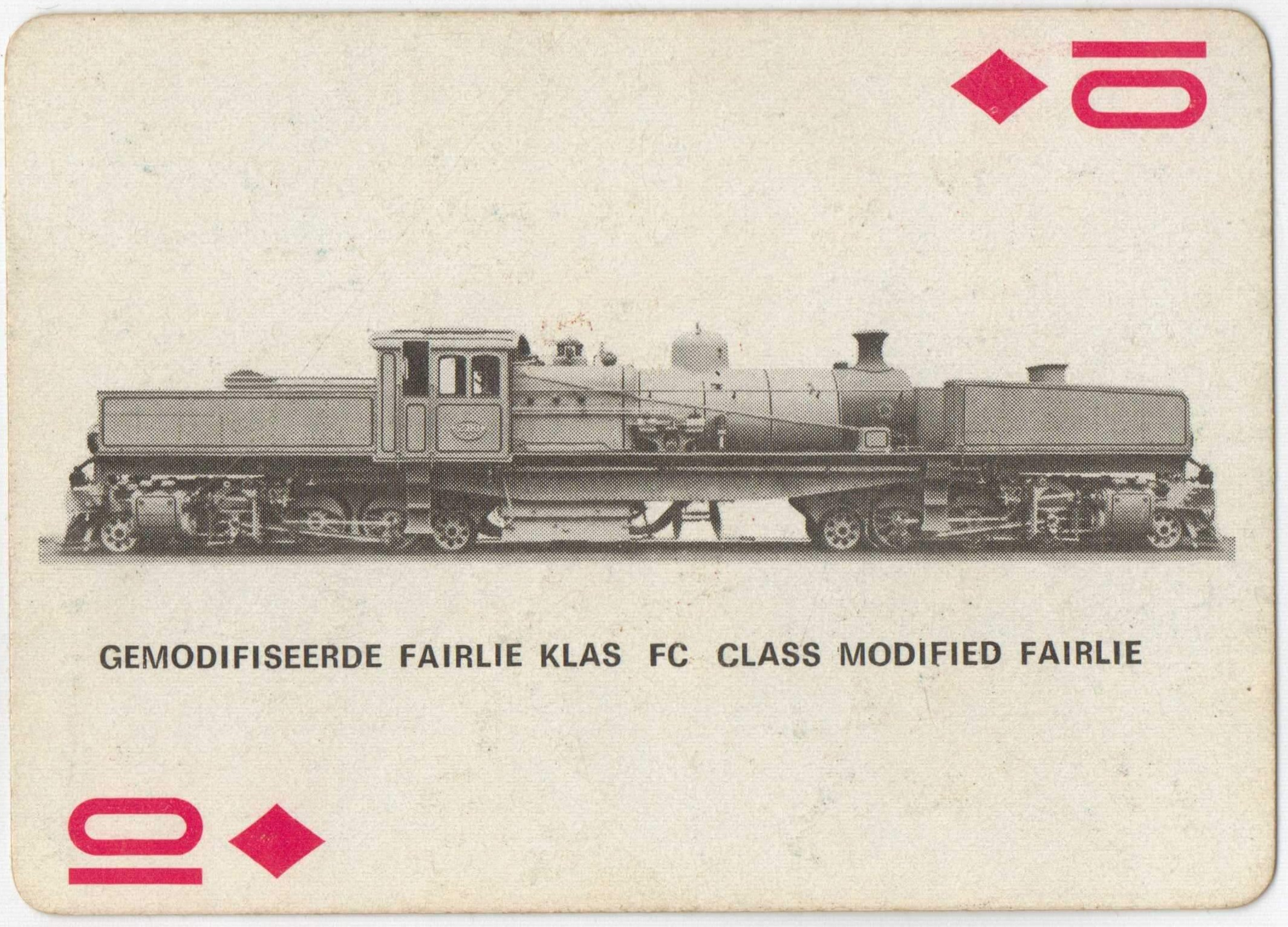
Class FC 2310 (2-6-2+2-6-2) SAR Museum Playing Card
