= South African Class GD 2-6-2+2-6-2 =

1925 articulated steam locomotive

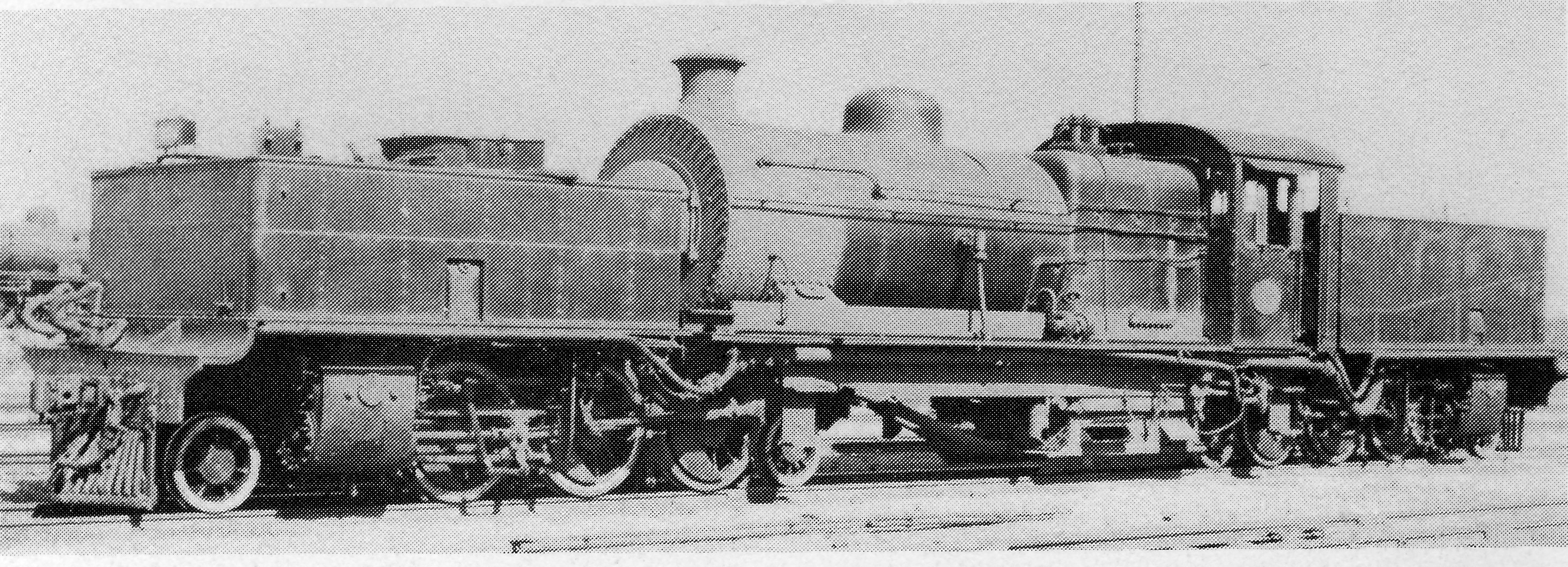
- Class GD Garratt, c. 1965
Type and origin
- Power type: Steam
- Designer: Beyer, Peacock & Company
- Builder: Beyer, Peacock & Company
- Serial number: 6263–6266, 6281–6290
- Model: Class GD
- Build date: 1925–1926
- Total produced: 14
Specifications
- Configuration
  - Whyte: 2-6-2+2-6-2 (Double Prairie)
  - UIC: 1'C1'+1'C1'h4
- Driver: 3rd & 4th coupled axles
- Gauge: 3 ft 6 in (1,067 mm) Cape gauge
- Leading dia.: 28 1/2 in (724 mm)
- Coupled dia.: 46 in (1,168 mm)
- Trailing dia.: 28 1/2 in (724 mm)
- Wheelbase: 58 ft 4 in (17,780 mm)
  - Engine: 18 ft 9 in (5,715 mm) each
  - Coupled: 8 ft 6 in (2,591 mm) each
- Pivot centres: 30 ft 6 in (9,296 mm)
- Length
  - Over couplers: 65 ft 3/4 in (19,831 mm)
- Height: 12 ft 10 1/4 in (3,918 mm)
- Frame type: Plate
- Axle load: 12 LT 15 cwt (12,950 kg)
  - Leading: 11 LT 7 cwt (11,530 kg) front 11 LT 16 cwt (11,990 kg) rear
  - 1st coupled: 12 LT 10 cwt (12,700 kg)
  - 2nd coupled: 12 LT 10 cwt (12,700 kg)
  - 3rd coupled: 12 LT 10 cwt (12,700 kg)
  - 4th coupled: 12 LT 11 cwt (12,750 kg)
  - 5th coupled: 12 LT 11 cwt (12,750 kg)
  - 6th coupled: 12 LT 15 cwt (12,950 kg)
  - Trailing: 7 LT 15 cwt (7,874 kg) front 7 LT 16 cwt (7,925 kg) rear
- Adhesive weight: 75 LT 7 cwt (76,560 kg)
- Loco weight: 114 LT 1 cwt (115,900 kg)
- Fuel type: Coal
- Fuel capacity: 5 LT (5.1 t) as built 9 LT (9.1 t) no. 2220
- Water cap.: 2,300 imp gal (10,500 L) front 1,500 imp gal (6,820 L) rear
- Firebox
  - Type: Belpaire
  - Grate area: 40 sq ft (3.7 m^{2})
- Boiler
  - Pitch: 7 ft 9 1/4 in (2,369 mm)
  - Diameter: 6 ft (1,829 mm)
  - Tube plates: 10 ft 7 7/8 in (3,248 mm)
  - Small tubes: 184: 2 in (51 mm)
  - Large tubes: 32: 5 1/2 in (140 mm)
- Boiler pressure: 180 psi (1,241 kPa)
- Safety valve: Ramsbottom
- Heating surface
  - Firebox: 172 sq ft (16.0 m^{2})
  - Tubes: 1,517 sq ft (140.9 m^{2})
  - Total surface: 1,689 sq ft (156.9 m^{2})
- Superheater
  - Heating area: 370 sq ft (34 m^{2})
- Cylinders: 4
- Cylinder size: 15 in (381 mm) bore 24 in (610 mm) stroke
- Valve gear: Walschaerts
- Valve type: Piston
- Couplers: Bell link-and-pin AAR knuckle (1940s-1950s)
Performance figures
- Tractive effort: 31,690 lbf (141.0 kN) @ 75%
Career
- Operators: South African Railways
- Class: Class GD
- Number in class: 14
- Numbers: 2220–2223, 2228–2237
- Delivered: 1925/26
- First run: 1925
- Withdrawn: 1967

The South African Railways Class GD 2-6-2+2-6-2 of 1925 was an articulated steam locomotive.

In 1925, the South African Railways placed four Class GD Garratt articulated locomotives with a 2-6-2+2-6-2 Double Prairie type wheel arrangement in branchline service. Another ten of these locomotives were delivered in 1926.

== Manufacturer ==
The Class GD 2-6-2+2-6-2 Double Prairie type Garratt locomotive was marginally larger and more powerful than its predecessor Class GC, with a heavier axle loading, but also intended for branchline work. Four locomotives were delivered by Beyer, Peacock & Company in December 1925, numbered in the range from 2220 to 2223. These were followed in January 1926 by ten more from the same manufacturer, seven of them built in 1925 and numbered in the range from 2228 to 2234, and the last three built in 1926 and numbered in the range from 2235 to 2237.

== Characteristics ==
They locomotives were superheated and had plate frames, Belpaire fireboxes, piston valves and Walschaerts valve gear.

As built, their coal bunkers had a 5 long tons (5.1 tonnes) capacity. At some stage, the coal bunker of no. 2220 was enlarged to a 9 long tons (9.1 tonnes) capacity.

== Service ==
The locomotives were placed in service on the North Coast and the Pietermaritzburg to Franklin lines in Natal. From 1926, some were allocated to Paarden Eiland to work on the line from Cape Town across Sir Lowry's Pass to Caledon in the Overberg. They were the first Garratts to work the Caledon line and were later joined by the two Class GK Garratts after the New Cape Central Railway was absorbed by the SAR in 1925.

The Class GD proved themselves as handy and trouble-free locomotives and gave good service for more than forty years. They were later allocated to the Cape Midland system to work across the Montagu Pass between George and Oudtshoorn for many years until they were finally all allocated to the Port Alfred branch. They remained there until they were withdrawn from service in 1967.
