= South African Class GL 4-8-2+2-8-4 =

1929 articulated steam locomotive

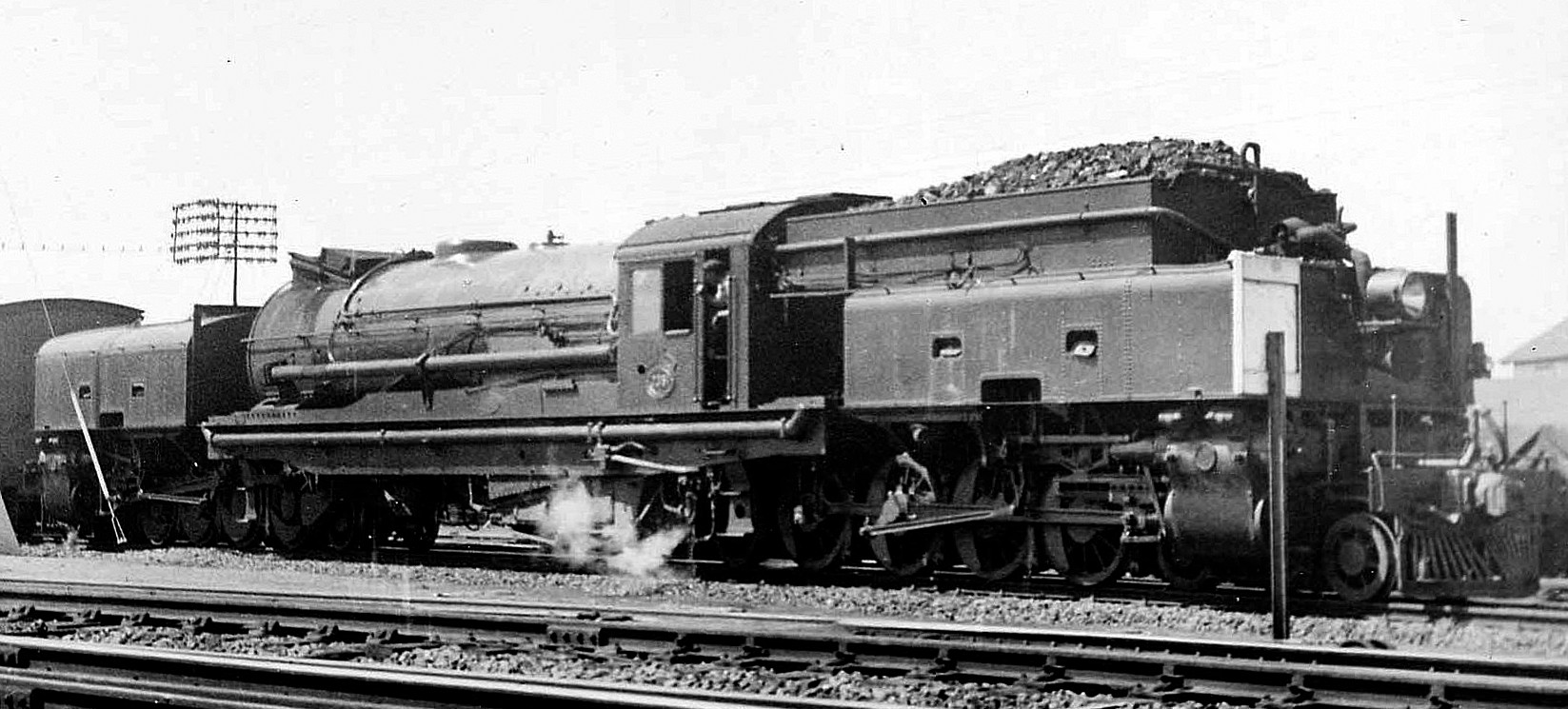
- No. 2351 Princess Alice, c. 1930
Type and origin
- Power type: Steam
- Builder: Beyer, Peacock & Company
- Serial number: 6530–6531, 6639–6644
- Build date: 1929–1930
- Total produced: 8
Specifications
- Configuration
  - Whyte: 4-8-2+2-8-4 (Double Mountain)
  - UIC: 2'D1'+1'D2'h4t
- Driver: 3rd & 6th coupled axles
- Gauge: 3 ft 6 in (1,067 mm) Cape gauge
- Leading dia.: 28 1/2 in (724 mm)
- Coupled dia.: 48 in (1,219 mm)
- Trailing dia.: 33 in (838 mm)
- Wheelbase: 83 ft 7 in (25,476 mm)
  - Axle spacing (Asymmetrical): 1-2: 4 ft 3 in (1,295 mm); 2-3: 4 ft 3 in (1,295 mm); 3-4: 4 ft 9 in (1,448 mm)
  - Engine: 27 ft 8 in (8,433 mm) each
  - Leading: 6 ft 2 in (1,880 mm) each
  - Coupled: 13 ft 3 in (4,039 mm) each
- Pivot centres: 41 ft 6 in (12,649 mm)
- Length
  - Over couplers: 90 ft 7 7/8 in (27,632 mm)
- Height: 13 ft (3,962 mm)
- Frame type: Bar
- Axle load: 18 LT 14 cwt (19,000 kg)
  - Leading: 21 LT 10 cwt (21,850 kg) front 19 LT 12 cwt (19,910 kg) rear
  - 1st coupled: 17 LT 18 cwt (18,190 kg)
  - 2nd coupled: 18 LT (18,290 kg)
  - 3rd coupled: 18 LT (18,290 kg)
  - 4th coupled: 17 LT 11 cwt (17,830 kg)
  - Trailing: 12 LT 6 cwt (12,500 kg) front 12 LT 16 cwt (13,010 kg) rear
- Adhesive weight: 144 LT 17 cwt (147,200 kg)
- Loco weight: 211 LT 1 cwt (214,400 kg)
- Fuel type: Coal
- Fuel capacity: 12 LT (12.2 t)
- Water cap.: 4,650 imp gal (21,100 L) front 2,350 imp gal (10,700 L) rear
- Firebox
  - Type: Round-top
  - Grate area: 75 sq ft (7.0 m^{2})
- Boiler
  - Pitch: 8 ft 6 in (2,591 mm)
  - Diameter: 7 ft (2,134 mm)
  - Tube plates: 14 ft 6 1/2 in (4,432 mm)
  - Small tubes: 263: 2 in (51 mm)
  - Large tubes: 50: tubes 5 1/2 in (140 mm)
- Boiler pressure: 200 psi (1,379 kPa)
- Safety valve: Pop
- Heating surface
  - Firebox: 347 sq ft (32.2 m^{2})
  - Tubes: 3,049 sq ft (283.3 m^{2})
  - Total surface: 3,396 sq ft (315.5 m^{2})
- Superheater
  - Heating area: 835 sq ft (77.6 m^{2})
- Cylinders: Four
- Cylinder size: 22 in (559 mm) bore 26 in (660 mm) stroke
- Valve gear: Walschaerts
- Valve type: Piston
- Couplers: AAR knuckle
Performance figures
- Tractive effort: 78,650 lbf (349.9 kN) @ 75%
Career
- Operators: South African Railways
- Class: Class GL
- Number in class: 8
- Numbers: 2350–2357
- Delivered: 1929–1930
- First run: 1929
- Withdrawn: 1972
- Disposition: 2 preserved, 6 scrapped

The South African Railways Class GL 4-8-2+2-8-4 of 1929 was a class of articulated steam locomotive.

In 1929 and 1930, the South African Railways placed eight Class GL Garratt articulated steam locomotives with a 4-8-2+2-8-4 Double Mountain type wheel arrangement in service. Built by Beyer, Peacock & Company in Manchester, England, they were originally designed to work on the Durban to Cato Ridge section of the Natal mainline. The Class GL was eventually displaced to the route between Glencoe and Vryheid before spending their final working years operating on the line from Stanger to Empangeni.

== Origin ==
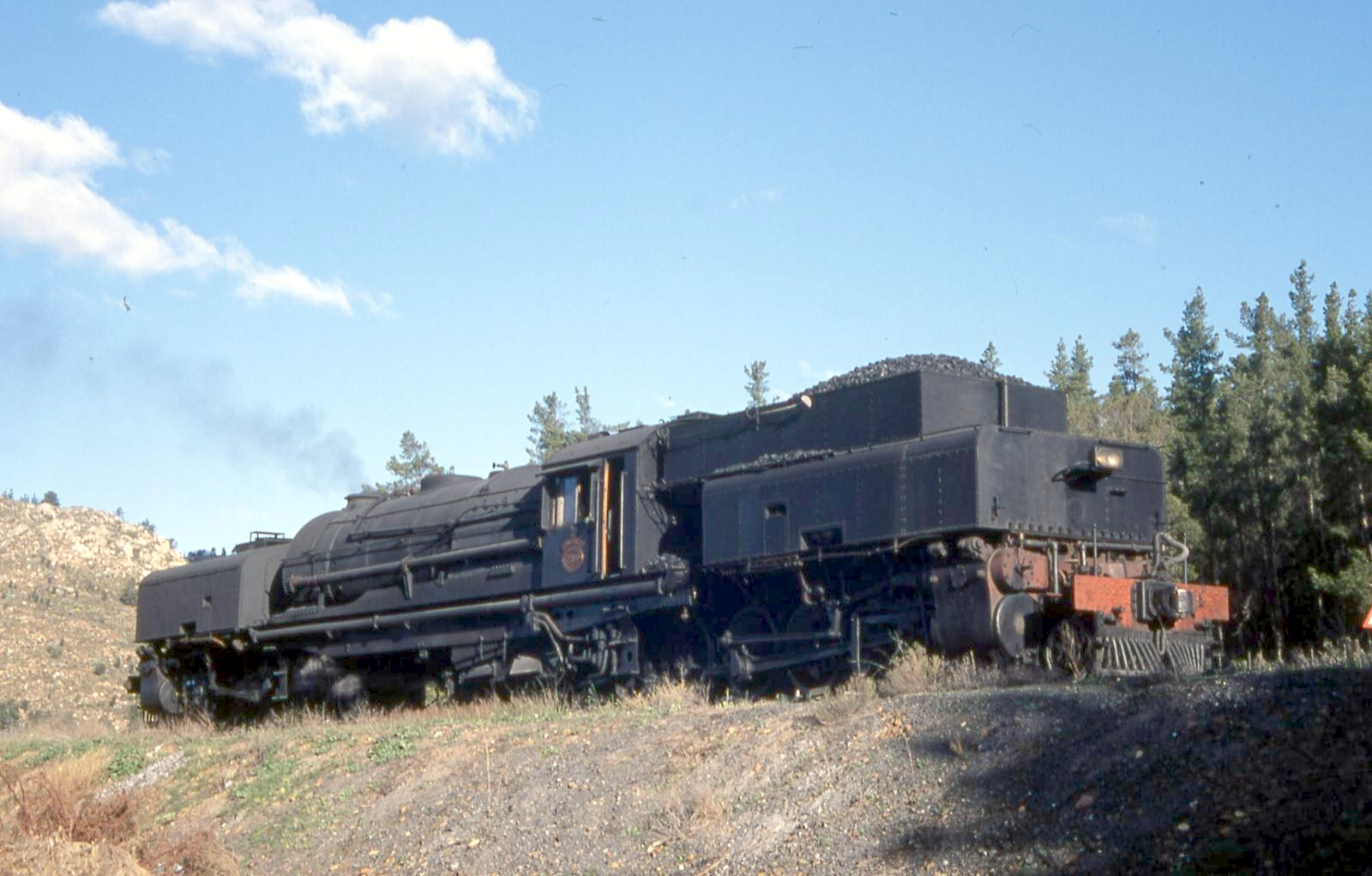
No. 2351 Princess Alice at Camfer on the Montagu Pass during a tourist excursion, c. 2001

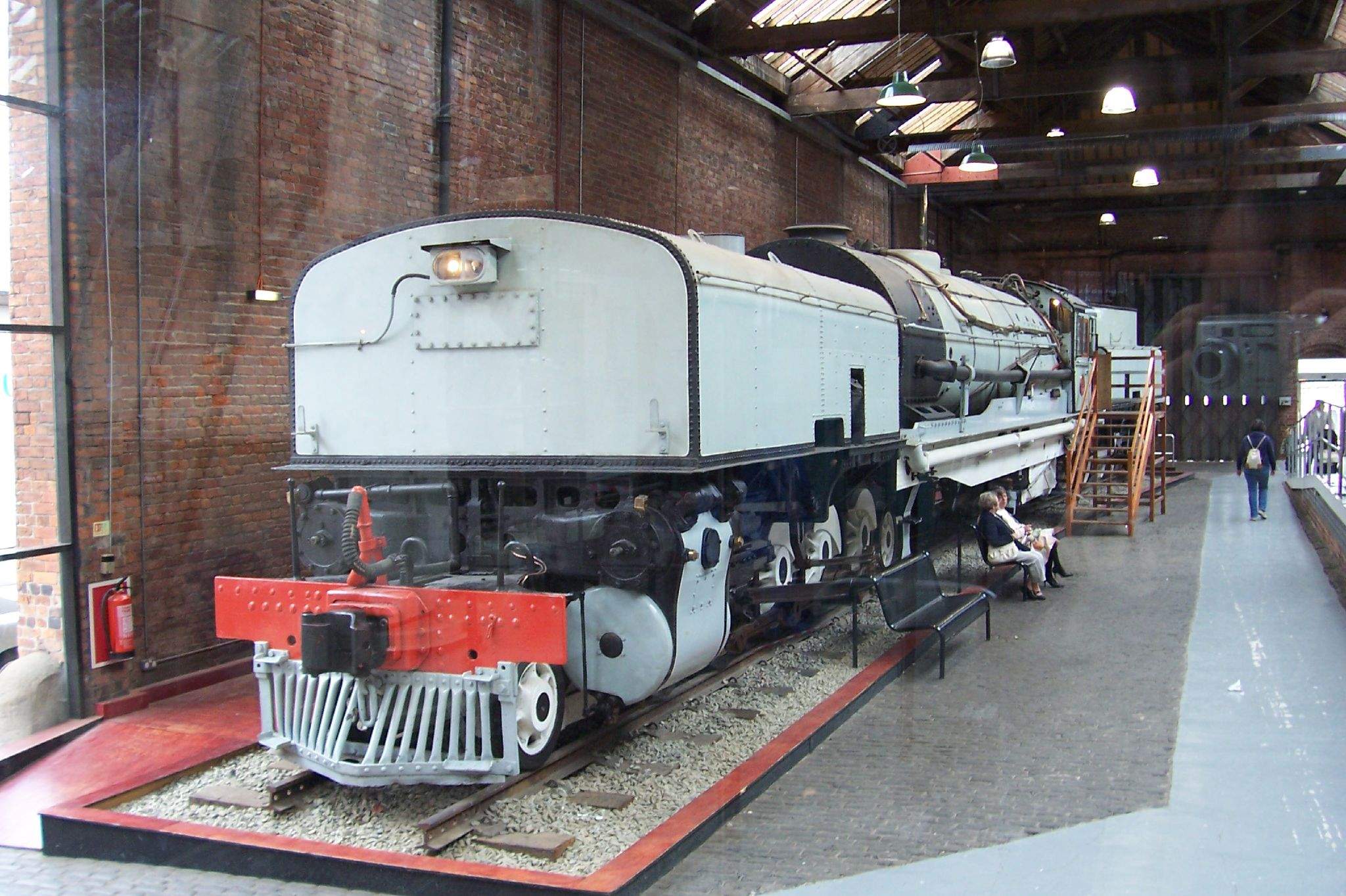
No. 2352 on display at the Science & Industry Museum in Manchester

The Class GL had its origin in the steady increase in loads experienced by the Natal mainline in the years prior to the First World War. The old Natal mainline had gradients of 1 in 30 (3⅓%) whilst the newer line, relocated to provide an easier route, still had 38 miles (61 kilometres) of near-uninterrupted 1 in 66 (1½%) gradients. Moreover, the tight curvature of the line with curves of as little as 275 feet (84 metres) radius precluded the use of large, long wheelbased, non-articulated locomotives and restricted them to a coupled wheelbase of 9 feet (2,743 millimetres). These factors combined with ever-increasing train weights ensured that the line rapidly became a bottleneck.

The decision to electrify the line from Glencoe Junction to Durban had been taken in 1914, coincidentally the year in which the South African Railways (SAR) ordered its first Cape gauge Garratt, the Class GA 2-6-0+0-6-2. Electrification was placed in abeyance along with the delivery of the Class GA until the end of World War I.

Despite this delay, the process of electrification began in earnest in 1922 and by 1926 full electrified haulage had been instituted between Glencoe and Pietermaritzburg, with lashups of three electric locomotives being used on the heaviest freights. These trains were then hauled onward to Durban by a pair of Class 14 4-8-2 steam locomotives.

The success of the Class GA Garratt in proving the suitability of the Garratt design for South African conditions coupled with the economies in crew, fuel and water consumption it offered, provided an incentive for the SAR to consider a new Garratt class for use on the Natal mainline. The aim was to eliminate double-heading as a regular practice with such a locomotive to be equivalent to three of the Class 1E electric locomotives which were then in use, or two Class 14 steam locomotives.

== Manufacturer ==
Colonel F.R. Collins DSO, the Chief Mechanical Engineer (CME) of the SAR from 1922 to 1929, prepared the specifications and the contract for the design and construction of these locomotives, the Class GL, was awarded to Beyer, Peacock & Company. The locomotive was to be approximately equal to two Class 14 locomotives in power output with a maximum permitted axle loading of 18 long tons (18 tonnes) owing to the use of 80 pounds per yard (40 kilograms per metre) rail on both sections of the mainline, and a maximum all-up weight of 215 long tons (218,500 kilograms).

Since these locomotives would be some 48% larger and more powerful than any locomotive previously employed on the SAR and up to twice the track gauge in width, the initial order was for two prototype locomotives only, with more to follow should they prove successful. They were delivered in September 1929 and were erected in the Durban shops, numbered 2350 and 2351, and placed in service in October. They proved to be so successful that the remaining six locomotives were quickly ordered for delivery in 1930. These six entered service in July 1930, numbered in the range from 2352 to 2357.

== Trials ==
At the time, they were the most powerful steam locomotives to be placed in service anywhere in the Southern Hemisphere and attained the objective of constructing a locomotive to approximately equal the power output of two Class 14 locomotives. Mr. W.G. Bishop, Natal Locomotive Superintendent, took part in the design process and successfully carried out the initial tests. On their first test run, despite the cut-off on these locomotives being limited to 65%, 1,117 long tons (1,135 tonnes) were hauled from Durban to Cato Ridge in 163 minutes, compared to 500 long tons (508 tonnes) in 184 minutes for a Class 14. Moreover, this was achieved on half throttle and with the cut-off set at 45%.

This suggested that the Class GL had still more to give, which was confirmed on the following day's testing when a load of 1,205 long tons (1,224 tonnes) was hauled over the same stretch of track. As a result of these tests, the further six Class GL locomotives were ordered for delivery in 1930. Apart from demonstrating the Class GL's power and capacity for hauling heavy trains, these tests also showed that their running qualities were exceptional, being smooth and free-running machines. In many ways, the Class GL set a design standard which was followed later in the Class GM, Class GMA and Class GO.

== Characteristics ==
The Class GL embodied comparatively few features of any particular novelty. Instead, they were designed to make the best possible use of existing technologies to produce a locomotive of great power, efficiency and reliability. Their all-up weight of 214 long tons 2 hundredweight (217,500 kilograms) coupled with their 18 long tons 14 hundredweight (19,000 kilograms) axle loading closely matched the limits laid down by the SAR. Their tractive effort of 78,650 pounds-force (350 kilonewtons) at 75% of boiler pressure remained the highest of any locomotive on the SAR for the duration of the steam era.

=== Frame ===
The main frames were 5 inches (127 millimetres) thick cut bar frames. On the SAR, the bar frame had previously only been employed on the German-built Class GCA 2-6-2+2-6-2 Garratt.

=== Valves and cylinders ===
The Class GL made use of Beyer, Peacock's standard lever-actuated Sterling-type steam-operated power reverser and a Pyle National Company turbo-generator. The piston valves were modern straight-ported types with long-lap, long-travel valves, used for the first time in a South African Garratt which made the Class GL very free-running and more efficient than its predecessors. The cylinders, of the same bore and stroke as those of the Class 14, drove the third coupled axles using long connecting rods which stabilised the locomotive by reducing vertical forces at the crosshead to a minimum. This method of design became the standard on most Beyer-Garratts thereafter.

=== Pivots ===
To allow for the tight curves, including 300 feet (91 metres) radius bends with 4 1/2 inches (114 millimetres) superelevation without any intermediate tangent and the steep, twisting nature of the line, the front engine unit's pivot bearing was spherical, with its alignment controlled by sprung rollers. The rear pivot was the usual Beyer, Peacock flat adjustable type.

=== Boiler and firebox ===
The boiler was of exceptional size with an inside diameter of 7 feet (2,134 millimetres), double the track gauge. It used a top feed and contained 263 small tubes of 2 inches (51 millimetres) outside diameter and 50 large tubes of 5 1/2 inches (140 millimetres) outside diameter, while the superheater elements were of 1 1/2 inches (38 millimetres) diameter. The round-topped firebox with its 75 square feet (7.0 square metres) grate area was fired by a duplex mechanical stoker, the only class on the SAR which had this feature. The firebox contained two Nicholson thermic syphons and two arch tubes. Clyde Superior soot blowers were fitted on each side of the firebox. Beyer, Peacock estimated the Class GL locomotive's economical coal consumption rate at 3 1/2 long tons (3.6 tonnes) per hour.

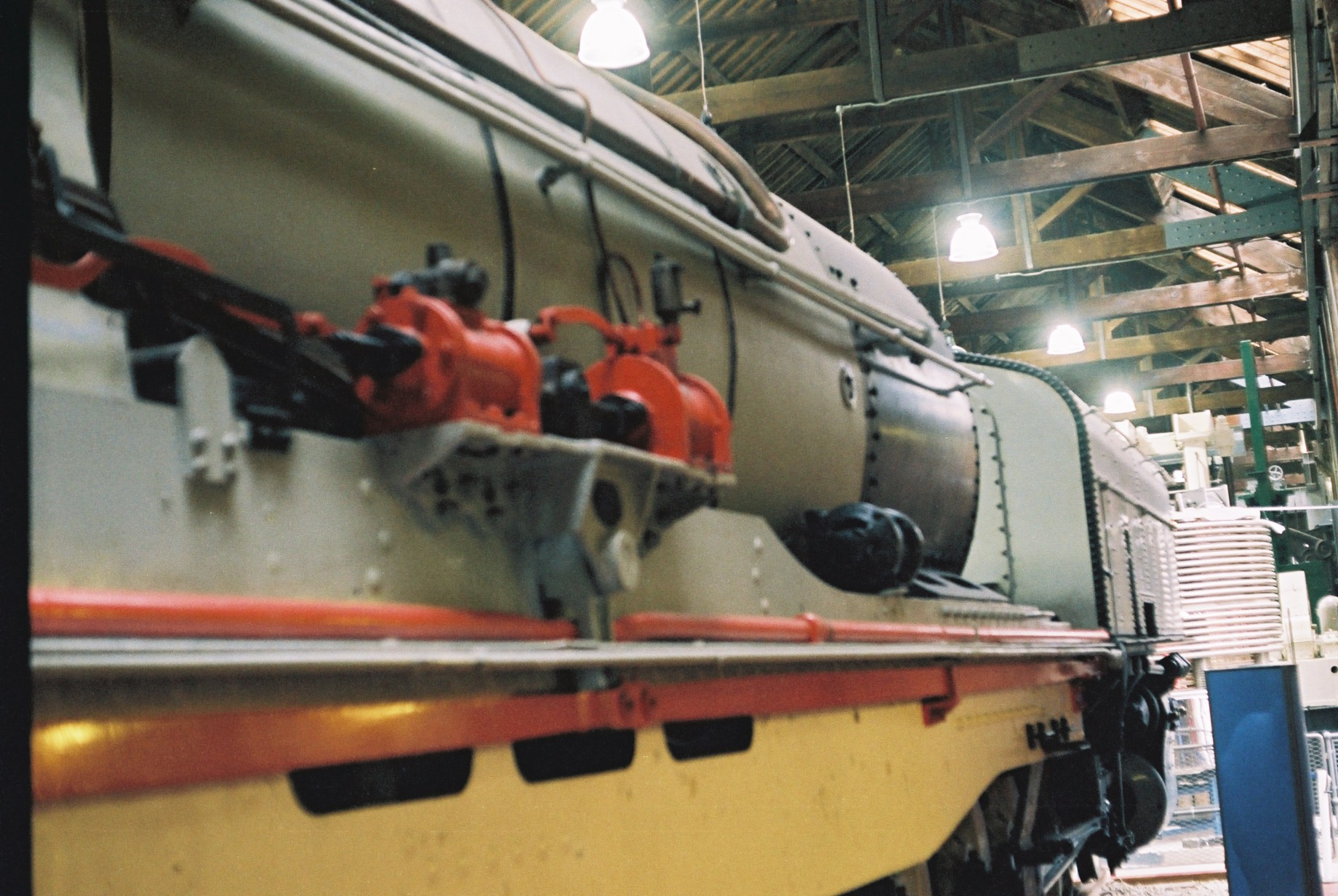
Detail of the power reverser (left) and Pyle National Company turbo-generator (right) on no. 2352

The Class GL had a rocking grate and self-cleaning hopper ashpan with water and steam sprayers to dampen down the ash to prevent it from entering axle boxes, motion areas and other friction-sensitive places. They had self-cleaning type smokeboxes and their axle boxes were grease-lubricated.

=== Crew comfort ===
The locomotives were equipped with a Sturtevant powered fan blower to supply fresh air to the cab, sucked from ahead of the chimney and driven by a steam turbine in deference to the eleven tunnels on this section which totalled to almost 2 miles (3 kilometres), the longest being the Shongweni tunnel at 1/2 mile (805 metres). This proved less than satisfactory, as did the smoke deflecting cowls over the chimneys of the second batch of locomotives. These cowls were controlled by steam-operated cylinders and, when not required, could be withdrawn longitudinally from the position over the chimney orifice. Since Garratts are designed to be bi-directional, the problem was eventually solved by simply running them with the chimney trailing on the ascending legs of the tunneled routes.

== Service ==
Owing to limitations in the length of sidings and crossing loops, the Class GL's allowed loads were originally 1,000 long tons (1,016 tonnes) from Durban to Cato Ridge and 2,000 long tons (2,032 tonnes) coastward, despite having shown themselves capable of greater loads. They were eventually marshalled to standard loads of between 950 and 1,000 long tons (965 and 1,016 tonnes) to correspond with the load which could be hauled by a lashup of three electric locomotives.

During April 1931, no. 2351 hauled a special train conveying the Governor-General of South Africa, His Excellency the Earl of Athlone and Princess Alice. The Governor-General and the Princess travelled on the footplate from Cato Ridge to Umlaas and expressed keen delight at the experience, which led to the Princess granting the SAR permission to name the locomotive on which she had travelled after her. The name plates were affixed to the cabsides above the number plates.

In 1947, no. 2352 was the Garratt selected to haul the Royal Train between Glencoe and Piet Retief while sister engine no. 2355 hauled the pilot train over the same section.

Upon completion of the electrification project between Durban and Pietermaritzburg in 1938, the eight locomotives were transferred from the Durban section to the gruelling run between Glencoe and Vryheid with the latter's coal trains. This work entailed the regular haulage of 1,200 long tons (1,219 tonnes) up gradients of 1 in 50, taxing the Class GL even more heavily than the work for which it was designed. Despite this, they maintained an effective service along this line until its electrification in 1968.

The Class GL was then transferred from Glencoe to work the line between Stanger and Empangeni in the late 1940s. However, since the loads on this route did not fully justify the use of the powerful Class GL while their great weight and high axle loading restricted them to mainlines laid with heavy rail, they were eventually replaced by less powerful, more modern and more economical Class GMA locomotives. Though briefly considered as hump shunters at Bloemfontein, the Class GL had outlasted its use and after some forty-two years of working the most difficult terrain on the SAR, they were withdrawn from service in 1972.

== Preservation ==
Of the eight locomotives, the first two have survived into preservation. No. 2351 Princess Alice is preserved at the Outeniqua Transport Museum in George.

No. 2352 was allocated to the National Collection of the South African Railway Museum. It was staged at Greyville Loco in Durban at the time and the Loco Foreman at Greyville was asked to prepare the engine for haulage up to Germiston Loco where it was intended to stage the engine. His response was that no engine would leave his Depot under haulage and that he would have it prepared to steam and travel up to Germiston under its own power, which it did in due course.

The development of the planned new museum was shelved indefinitely and the condition of the locomotive gradually deteriorated where it stood at Germiston. Some eight years later, in 1983 the Science & Industry Museum. Manchester after failing to acquire East African Railways 59 class 5930, because of high shipping costs, asked if it could acquire the engine. This request was granted and with the help of shipping sponsors, it duly arrived back in Manchester. By the time it was shipped to England, it was shorn of around two hundred parts including its right-hand-side ashpan and much of its brick arch.
