= South African Class GK 2-6-2+2-6-2 =

1923 articulated steam locomotive

New Cape Central Garratt 2-6-2+2-6-2 South African Class GK 2-6-2+2-6-2
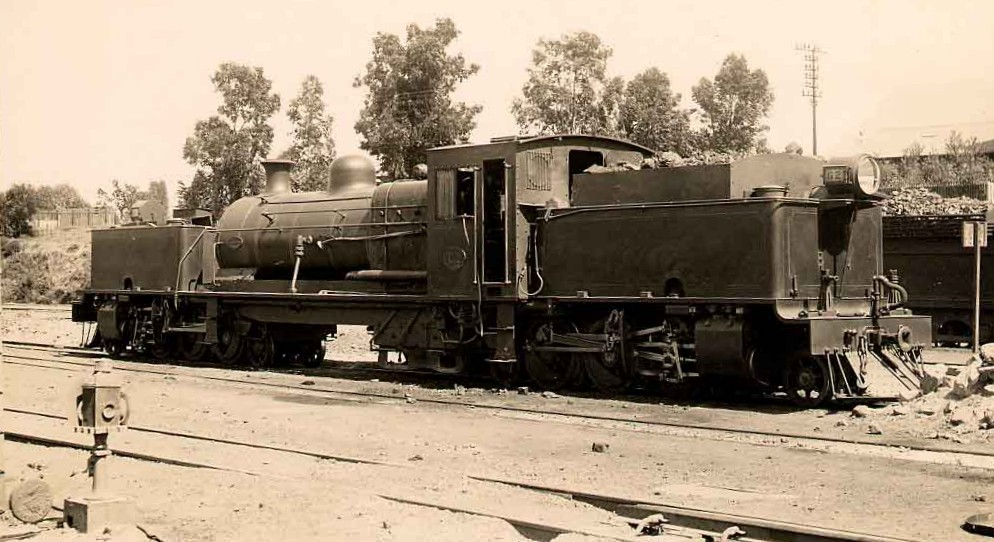
- NCCR no. G2, later SAR Class GK no. 2341, c. 1925
Type and origin
- Power type: Steam
- Designer: Beyer, Peacock & Company
- Builder: Beyer, Peacock & Company
- Serial number: 6135–6136
- Model: NCCR G
- Build date: 1923
- Total produced: 2
Specifications
- Configuration
  - Whyte: 2-6-2+2-6-2 (Double Prairie)
  - UIC: 1’C1’+1’C1’h4
- Driver: 3rd & 4th coupled axles
- Gauge: 3 ft 6 in (1,067 mm) Cape gauge
- Leading dia.: 28 1/2 in (724 mm)
- Coupled dia.: 42 3/4 in (1,086 mm)
- Trailing dia.: 28 1/2 in (724 mm)
- Wheelbase: 56 ft 8 in (17,272 mm)
  - Engine: 17 ft 8 in (5,385 mm) each
  - Coupled: 8 ft (2,438 mm) each
- Pivot centres: 29 ft 8 in (9,042 mm)
- Length
  - Over couplers: 63 ft 2 3/4 in (19,272 mm)
- Height: 12 ft 3 in (3,734 mm)
- Frame type: Plate
- Axle load: 10 LT 10 cwt (10,670 kg)
  - Leading: 8 LT 7 cwt (8,484 kg) front 8 LT 16 cwt (8,941 kg) rear
  - Coupled: 10 LT 10 cwt (10,670 kg)
  - Trailing: 6 LT 16 cwt (6,909 kg) front 7 LT 19 cwt (8,078 kg) rear
- Adhesive weight: 63 LT (64,010 kg)
- Loco weight: 94 LT 18 cwt (96,420 kg)
- Fuel type: Coal
- Fuel capacity: 4 LT (4.1 t)
- Water cap.: 1,900 imp gal (8,640 L) front 1,100 imp gal (5,000 L) rear
- Firebox
  - Type: Belpaire
  - Grate area: 34 sq ft (3.2 m^{2})
- Boiler
  - Pitch: 7 ft 3 3/8 in (2,219 mm)
  - Diameter: 5 ft 2 in (1,575 mm)
  - Tube plates: 11 ft 3 1/4 in (3,435 mm)
  - Small tubes: 225: 1 3/4 in (44 mm)
  - Large tubes: 24: 5 1/4 in (133 mm)
- Boiler pressure: 180 psi (1,241 kPa)
- Safety valve: Ramsbottom
- Heating surface
  - Firebox: 156 sq ft (14.5 m^{2})
  - Tubes: 1,531 sq ft (142.2 m^{2})
  - Total surface: 1,687 sq ft (156.7 m^{2})
- Superheater
  - Heating area: 300 sq ft (28 m^{2})
- Cylinders: Four
- Cylinder size: 15 in (381 mm) bore 22 in (559 mm) stroke
- Valve gear: Walschaerts
- Valve type: Piston
- Couplers: Johnston link-and-pin AAR knuckle (1930s)
Performance figures
- Tractive effort: 31,260 lbf (139.1 kN) @ 75%
Career
- Operators: New Cape Central Railways; South African Railways
- Class: Class GK
- Number in class: 2
- Numbers: NCCR 12-13, renumbered G1-G2; SAR 2340-2341
- Delivered: 1923
- First run: 1923
- Withdrawn: 1957

The South African Railways Class GK 2-6-2+2-6-2 of 1923 was an articulated steam locomotive from the New Cape Central Railway era.

In 1923, the New Cape Central Railway placed two Garratt articulated steam locomotives with a 2-6-2+2-6-2 Double Prairie type wheel arrangement in service. In 1925, when the New Cape Central Railway was amalgamated into the South African Railways, the two Garratts were renumbered and designated Class GK.

== New Cape Central Railway ==
The New Cape Central Railway (NCCR) was an independent privately owned railway company who operated between Worcester and Mossel Bay. It was formed in January 1893 when it purchased all the assets of the bankrupted Cape Central Railway (CCR) who had constructed a railway from Worcester via Robertson to Roodewal.

In 1894, the NCCR began work to extend the railway to Swellendam. From there it continued via Heidelberg to Riversdale, which was reached on 3 December 1903. Voorbaai, outside Mossel Bay, was reached in 1906.

When the Cape Government Railways linked up with the NCCR at Mossel Bay on 23 September 1907, the NCCR undertook to operate the 32 1/2-mile-long (52.3-kilometre) section to George.

Unlike many other privately owned railways in South Africa, the NCCR prospered and was well and efficiently run. Prior to 1917 dividends were small, but from 1917 to 1925 dividends of 4½% were declared each year. The NCCR was the last component railway to be added to the South African Railways (SAR) when it was liquidated and amalgamated in May 1925. All the NCCR locomotives which came onto the SAR roster continued to give good service for many years.

== Manufacturer ==
Increasing traffic and heavier loads led to the decision by the NCCR in 1922 to place an order with Beyer, Peacock & Company for two Garratt 2-6-2+2-6-2 Double Prairie type locomotives. The locomotives were built to the design of the Class GB of the SAR and were also superheated, with Belpaire fireboxes, plate frames, piston valves and Walschaerts valve gear, but they were heavier and had larger cylinders. They were delivered in 1923 and were initially numbered 12 and 13, but were later renumbered G1 and G2. The Garratts were the last new locomotives to be acquired by the company.

== Service ==
=== New Cape Central Railway ===
In service on the NCCR, each Garratt could replace two of the railway's older Class 7 locomotives, one 95 long tons (97 tonnes) Garratt being able to do the work of altogether 166 long tons (169 tonnes) worth of tender locomotives while saving 5 long tons (5 tonnes) of coal and one crew's wages in the process. The Garratts eliminated the need to double-head passenger trains which often consisted of eight bogie carriages.

=== South African Railways ===
When the NCCR was amalgamated into the SAR in 1925, the two Garratt locomotives were renumbered 2340 and 2341 on the SAR roster and designated Class GK.

The locomotives were initially transferred to Cape Town and later joined the Class GD Garratts on the Overberg branch line to Caledon for a brief period. Since they were much lighter than the Class GD, they were less useful as traffic engines. They were then sent to Natal where they remained in service on the Donnybrook to Underberg branch until they were withdrawn from service by 1957.

== Illustration ==
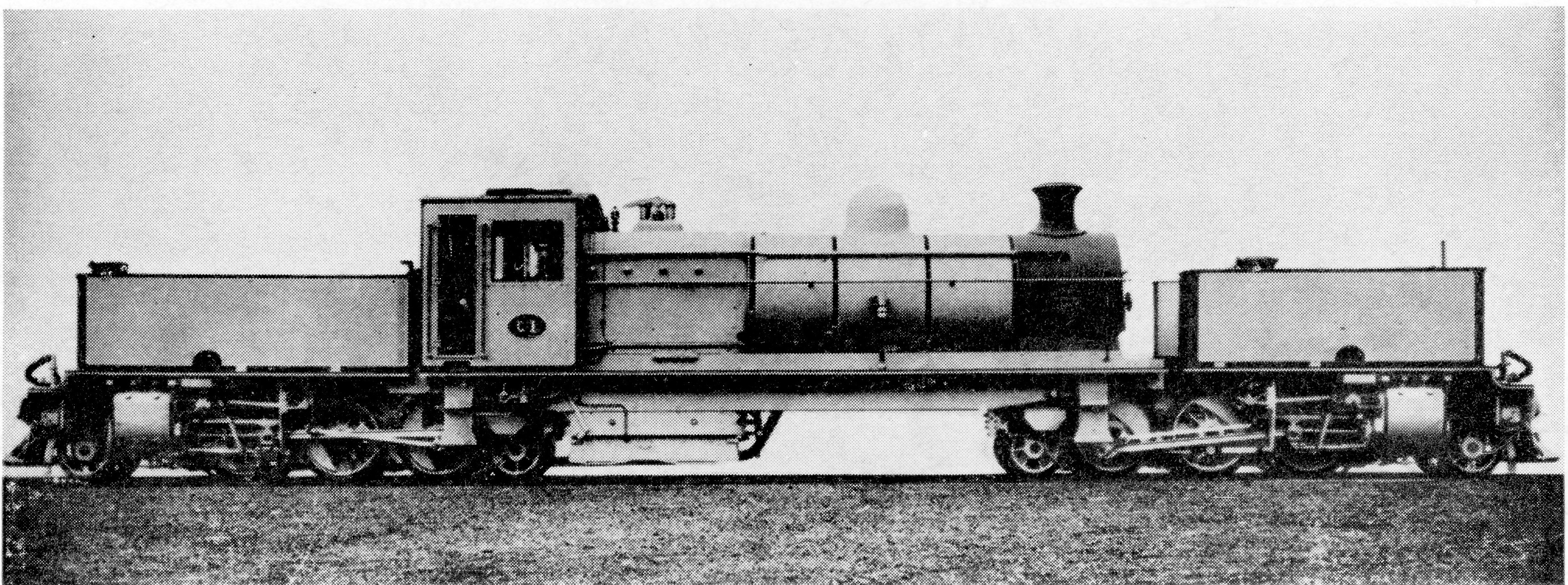
NCCR no. G1, later SAR Class GK no. 2340, as delivered c. 1923
