= NCCR =

NCCR may refer to:

- National Centre for Coastal Research, an attached office of India's Ministry of Earth Sciences
- National Centre of Competence in Research, a research instrument of the Swiss National Science Foundation (SNSF)
- National Convention for Construction and Reform–Mageuzi, a political party in Tanzania
- National Council of Chain Restaurants, a division of the American National Retail Federation
- National Council of Churches Review, a journal of the National Council of Churches in India
- New Cape Central Railway, a former railway company in South Africa
- North Cork Community Radio, a former Irish pirate radio station
- Non-consensual condom removal
