= 2-6-2+2-6-2 =

Locomotive wheel arrangement

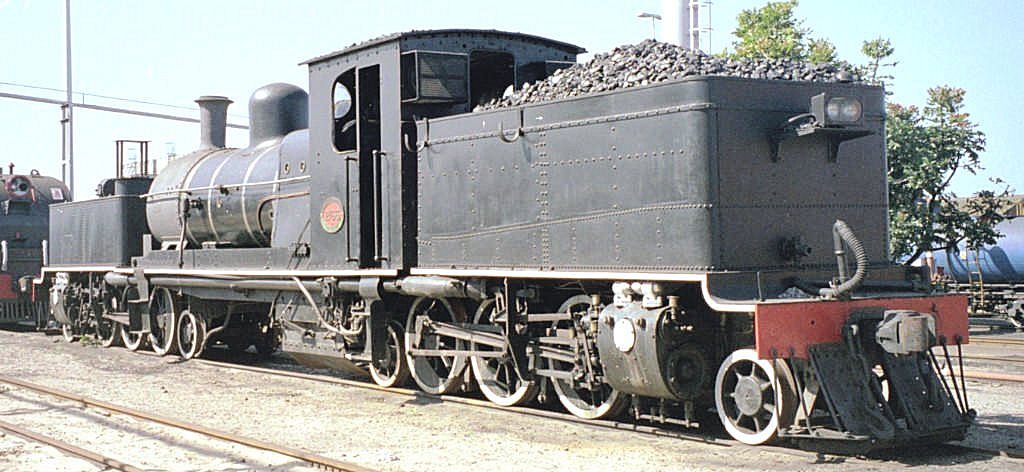
- South African Railways Class GB
Equivalent classifications
- UIC class: 1C1+1C1, 1'C1'+1'C1'
- French class: 131+131
- Turkish class: 35+35
- Swiss class: 3/5+3/5, 6/10 from 1920s
- Russian class: 1-3-1+1-3-1
First known tank engine version
- First use: 1912
- Country: Australia
- Locomotive: L class
- Railway: Tasmanian Government Railways
- Designer: Beyer, Peacock & Company
- Builder: Beyer, Peacock & Company
- Evolved from: 2-6-0+0-6-2

Under the Whyte notation for the classification of steam locomotives by wheel arrangement, 2-6-2+2-6-2 is an articulated locomotive using a pair of 2-6-2 power units back to back, with the boiler and cab suspended between them. The 2-6-2 wheel arrangement has a single pair of leading wheels in a leading truck, followed by three coupled pairs of driving wheels and a pair of trailing wheels in a trailing truck. This wheel arrangement could be called a Double Prairie, as all locomotives of this type are effectively two 2-6-2's that always run together.

== Overview ==
The 2-6-2+2-6-2 wheel arrangement was used on Garratt, Modified Fairlie and Union Garratt locomotives.

=== Garratt locomotives ===
The 2-6-2+2-6-2 was the second most numerous Garratt wheel arrangement to be built, with altogether 238 examples constructed by Beyer, Peacock & Company (BP) and its licensees. Most of them were built to 3 ft 6 in (1,067 mm) Cape gauge, 1,000 mm (3 ft 3 3/8 in) metre gauge and the 2 ft 6 in (762 mm) or 2 ft (610 mm) narrow gauges. None were built to the 4 ft 8 1/2 in (1,435 mm) standard gauge, but several were built to 5 ft 3 in (1,600 mm) and 5 ft 6 in (1,676 mm) gauges.

The first examples of the type were two 3 ft 6 in (1,067 mm) 2-6-2+2-6-2 L class Garratts built for the Tasmanian Government Railways in 1912. This wheel arrangement also included the final Garratts to be built by BP, seven 2 ft (610 mm) South African Class NG G16 locomotives in 1958.

2-6-2+2-6-2 Garratt production list – All manufacturers
Gauge	Railway	Class	Works no.	Units	Year	Builder
2 ft	South African Railways	NG G16	6919-6926	8	1939	Beyer, Peacock
2 ft	South African Railways	NG G16	7426-7432	7	1951	Beyer, Peacock
2 ft	South African Railways	NG G16	7862-7868	7	1958	Beyer, Peacock
2 ft	South African Railways	NG G12	2506-2507	2	1927	Société Franco-Belge, Belgium
2 ft	South African Railways	NG G14	10747	1	1930	Hanomag
2 ft	South African Railways	NG G13	10549-10551	3	1927	Hanomag
2 ft	South African Railways	NG G13	10598-10599	2	1928	Hanomag
2 ft	South African Railways	NG G13	10629-10635	7	1928	Hanomag
2 ft	South African Railways	NG G16	3894-3901	8	1967-68	Hunslet-Taylor
2 ft	South African Railways	NG G16	3265-3268	4	1936	John Cockerill
2 ft 6 in	Nepal Government Railway		6736	1	1932	Beyer, Peacock
2 ft 6 in	Nepal Government Railway		7243	1	1947	Beyer, Peacock
2 ft 6 in	Sierra Leone Government Railway		6297-6299	3	1926	Beyer, Peacock
2 ft 6 in	Sierra Leone Government Railway		6497-6498	2	1928	Beyer, Peacock
2 ft 6 in	Sierra Leone Government Railway		6578-6579	2	1929	Beyer, Peacock
2 ft 6 in	Sierra Leone Government Railway		7045-7048	4	1942	Beyer, Peacock
2 ft 6 in	Sierra Leone Government Railway		7049-7050	2	1943	Beyer, Peacock
1,000 mm	Great Western of Brazil		1024-1025	2	1929	Armstrong Whitworth
1,000 mm	La Robla Railway, Spain		421-422	2	1931	Babcock & Wilcox, Spain
1,000 mm	Assam Bengal Railway, India	T	6385-6389	5	1927	Beyer, Peacock
1,000 mm	Transandine Railway, Argentina	E12	6543-6546	4	1930	Beyer, Peacock
1,000 mm	Minera de Sierra Minera, Spain		189-190	2	1930	Euskalduna, Spain
1,000 mm	La Robla Railway, Spain		10646-10647	2	1929	Hanomag
1,000 mm	C.G. de F. Catalanes, Spain		1960-1963	4	1922	St Leonard, Belgium
1,000 mm	C.G. de F. Catalanes, Spain		2035-2038	4	1925	St Leonard, Belgium
3 ft 6 in	South African Railways	GB	5942	1	1921	Beyer, Peacock
3 ft 6 in	Natal Navigation Collieries, South Africa		6206	1	1925	Beyer, Peacock
3 ft 6 in	South African Railways	GG	6232	1	1925	Beyer, Peacock
3 ft 6 in	Dundee Coal & Coke, South Africa		6353	1	1927	Beyer, Peacock
3 ft 6 in	Trans Zambezia, Moçambique/Nyasaland	E	6380	1	1930	Beyer, Peacock
3 ft 6 in	Consolidated Main Reef Mine, South Africa		6780	1	1935	Beyer, Peacock
3 ft 6 in	Tasmanian Government Railways	L	5525-5526	2	1912	Beyer, Peacock
3 ft 6 in	New Cape Central Railway, South Africa	G	6135-6136	2	1923	Beyer, Peacock
3 ft 6 in	Trans Zambezia, Moçambique/Nyasaland	E	6178-6179	2	1924	Beyer, Peacock
3 ft 6 in	South African Railways	GB	6181-6186	6	1924	Beyer, Peacock
3 ft 6 in	South African Railways	GC	6187-6192	6	1924	Beyer, Peacock
3 ft 6 in	South African Railways	GD	6263-6266	4	1925	Beyer, Peacock
3 ft 6 in	Rhodesia Railways	13	6269-6280	12	1926	Beyer, Peacock
3 ft 6 in	South African Railways	GD	6281-6287	7	1925	Beyer, Peacock
3 ft 6 in	South African Railways	GD	6288-6290	3	1926	Beyer, Peacock
3 ft 6 in	Rhodesia Railways	14	6510-6515	6	1929	Beyer, Peacock
3 ft 6 in	Guayaquil & Quito Railway, Ecuador		6527-6529	3	1929	Beyer, Peacock
3 ft 6 in	Riotinto Railway, Spain		6560-6561	2	1928	Beyer, Peacock
3 ft 6 in	Rhodesia Railways	14	6616-6625	10	1930	Beyer, Peacock
3 ft 6 in	Rhodesia Railways	14A	7581-7592	12	1952	Beyer, Peacock
3 ft 6 in	Rhodesia Railways	14A	7599-7604	6	1953	Beyer, Peacock
3 ft 6 in	South African Railways	GCA	1043-1068	26	1928	Krupp
3 ft 6 in	South African Railways	GCA	970-982	13	1927	Krupp
3 ft 6 in	South African Railways	GDA	3115-3119	5	1929	Linke-Hofmann
5 ft 6 in	North Western Railway, India	GAS	6203	1	1925	Beyer, Peacock
5 ft 6 in	Ceylon Government Railway	C1	6410	1	1927	Beyer, Peacock
5 ft 6 in	São Paulo Railway, Brazil	R1	6367-6372	6	1927	Beyer, Peacock
5 ft 6 in	Ceylon Government Railway	C1A	7160-7167	8	1945	Beyer, Peacock

=== Modified Fairlie locomotives ===
The Modified Fairlie was first introduced in South Africa, when the South African Railways (SAR) experimented with a modified type of Fairlie locomotive in order to compare the concept to that of the Garratt locomotive in terms of actual performance and maintenance requirements. In essence, the Modified Fairlie was an adaptation of the Kitson-Meyer concept. It was similar in appearance to a Garratt, but with the boiler, cab, coal and water bunkers all mounted on a single rigid frame which pivoted on the engine units, with the pivot centers located approximately at the centre of the rigid wheelbase of each engine unit. In the Garratt design, by comparison, the coal and water bunkers are mounted directly on the engine units and swivel with them, while the boiler, firebox and cab are mounted on a rigid frame which is suspended between the two engine units.

=== Union Garratt locomotives ===
The Union Garratt was a hybrid locomotive, part Garratt and part Modified Fairlie, designed and built for the SAR by Maffei in Munich, Germany. The front end of the locomotive was of a typical Garratt arrangement, with a water tank mounted on the front engine unit’s frame, while the rear end was constructed in the Modified Fairlie fashion, with the coal bunker mounted on a rigid extension of the locomotive’s main frame and with the pivoting rear engine unit positioned beneath the coal bunker.

== Usage ==
=== Sierra Leone ===
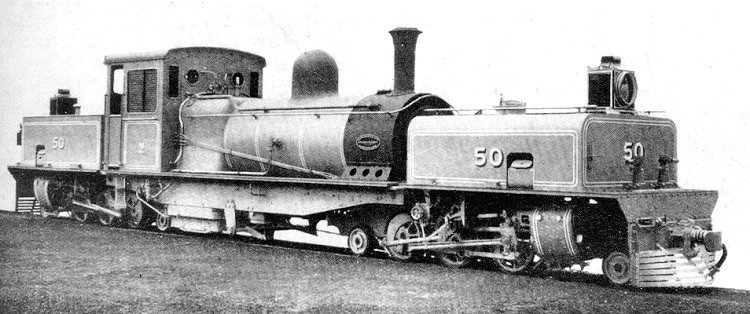
Sierra Leone Government Railway Garratt locomotive no. 50 of 1926

The Sierra Leone Government Railway acquired altogether 27 2 ft 6 in (762 mm) gauge 2-6-2+2-6-2 Garratt locomotives from BP between 1926 and 1956. Seven were delivered in 1926, 1928 and 1929. Six more followed in 1942 and 1943 and fourteen more in 1955 and 1956.

Another two were delivered to the Sierra Leone Development Corporation in 1937, also from BP.

=== South Africa ===
The largest user of the type was the South African Railways (SAR) who operated 132 locomotives of this wheel arrangement, spread over fifteen classes. Of these, ten classes were Cape gauge (83 locomotives) and five classes were 2 ft (610 mm) narrow gauge (49 locomotives). Two of the narrow gauge locomotives were later rebuilt to improve coal combustion and reclassified.

==== Cape gauge ====
The 3 ft 6 in (1,067 mm) Cape gauge 2-6-2+2-6-2 locomotives of the SAR entered service between 1921 and 1929.

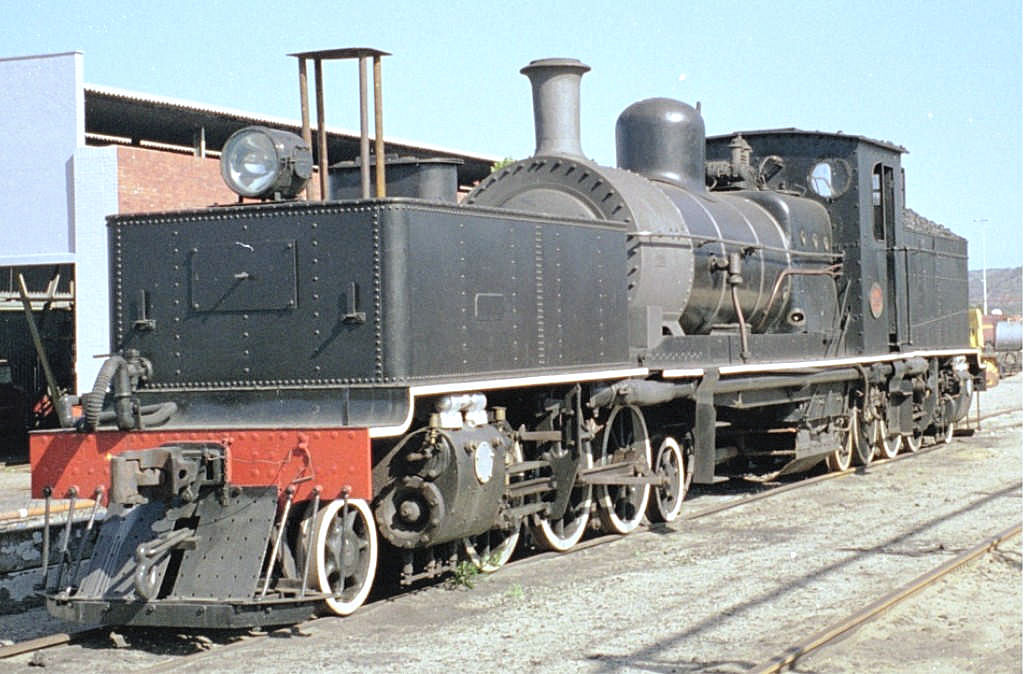
SAR Class GB no. 2166

- In 1921, a single experimental Class GB Garratt entered service, followed by six more in 1924, designed and built by BP. They were superheated, with Belpaire fireboxes, plate frames and Walschaerts valve gear.
- In 1923, the New Cape Central Railway (NCCR) placed two Garratts in service, built by BP in 1922 to the design of the Class GB. They were also superheated, with plate frames and Walschaerts valve gear, but heavier and with larger cylinders. In 1925, when the NCCR was amalgamated into the SAR, the two Garratts were designated Class GK.
- In 1924, a single experimental Class FC Modified Fairlie entered service, designed and built by North British Locomotive Company (NBL). It had Walschaerts valve gear, a plate frame and was superheated.
- In 1924 and 1925, six Class GC Garratts entered branchline service. They were built by BP in 1924 and were superheated, with Belpaire fireboxes, plate frames and Walschaerts valve gear.

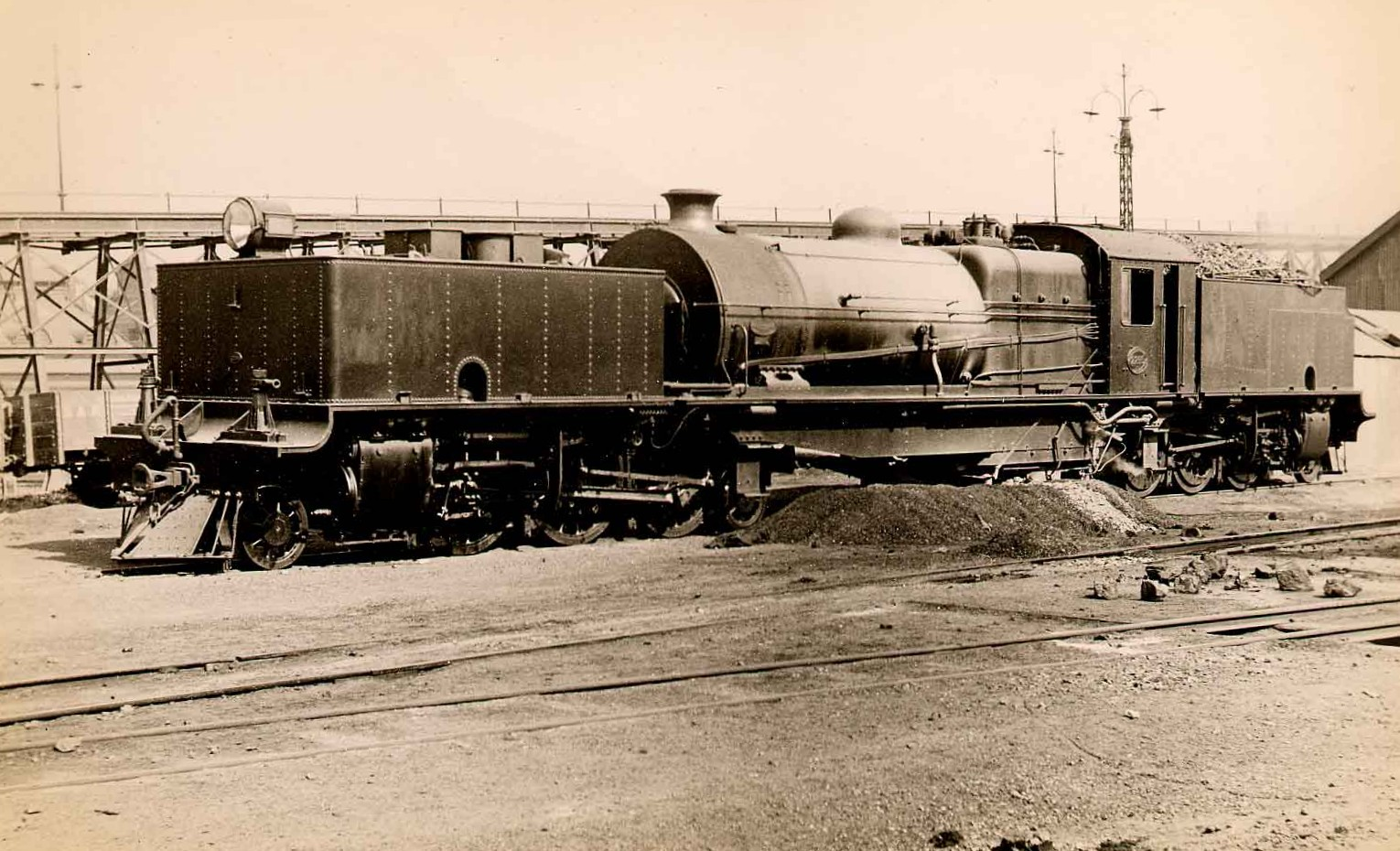
SAR Class GG no. 2290

- In 1925, a single Class GG Garratt entered service. It was a development of the Class GB with large 57 inches (1,450 millimetres) driving wheels for fast passenger service on mainline duties. Built by BP, it was superheated, with a plate frame, a Belpaire firebox and Walschaerts valve gear. The Class GG was the only Garratt on the SAR to be intended primarily for passenger working.
- In 1925 and 1926, fourteen Class GD Garratts entered branchline service. Marginally larger and more powerful than their predecessor Class GC and with a higher axle loading, they were built by BP. They were superheated and had plate frames, Belpaire fireboxes and Walschaerts valve gear.
- In 1926, four Class FD Modified Fairlies entered service, designed and built by NBL in 1925. They had Walschaerts valve gear, plate frames and were superheated.

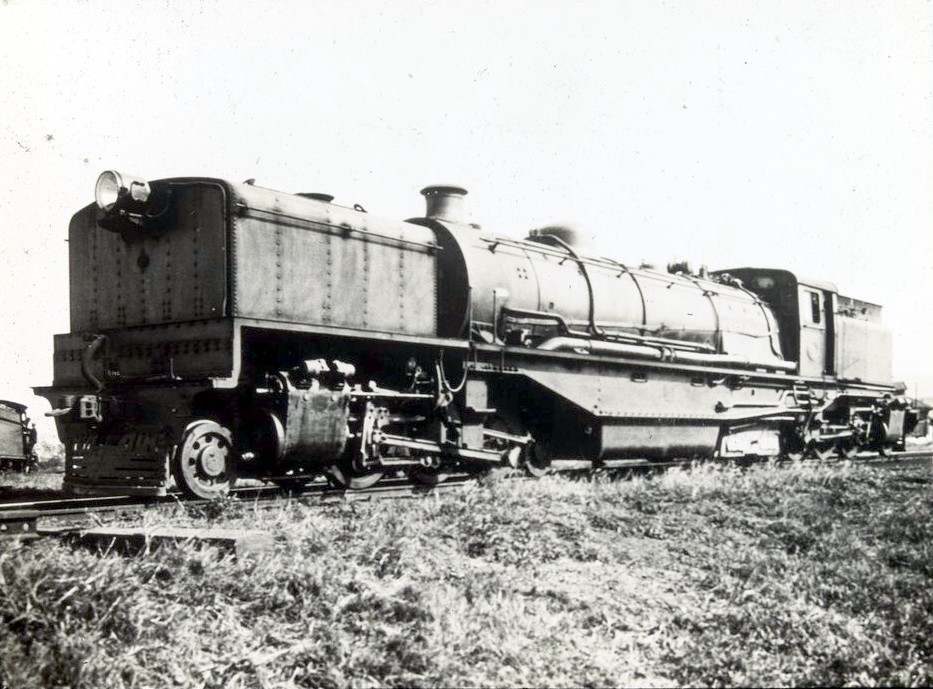
SAR Class U Union Garratt

- In 1927, ten Class U Union Garratt locomotives were placed in service. The locomotives, designed and built by Maffei, were superheated and had Walschaerts valve gear and bar frames.
- In 1927 and 1928, 39 Class GCA Garratts entered branchline service. They were built by Friedrich Krupp of Essen in Germany to the same specifications as the Class GC, but with bar frames, round-topped fireboxes and with water tanks and built-up coal bunkers of a different shape. Like the Class GC, they were superheated and had Walschaerts valve gear.
- In 1929, five Class GDA Garratts entered branchline service. They were built by Linke-Hofmann Werke in Breslau, Germany, to the same specifications as the Class GD, also superheated and with Walschaerts valve gear, but with bar frames, differently shaped coal and water bunkers and round-topped fireboxes.

==== Narrow gauge ====
The South African 2 ft (610 mm) narrow gauge 2-6-2+2-6-2 locomotives entered service between 1927 and 1968. Two were rebuilt in 1989 and 1990 and reclassified.

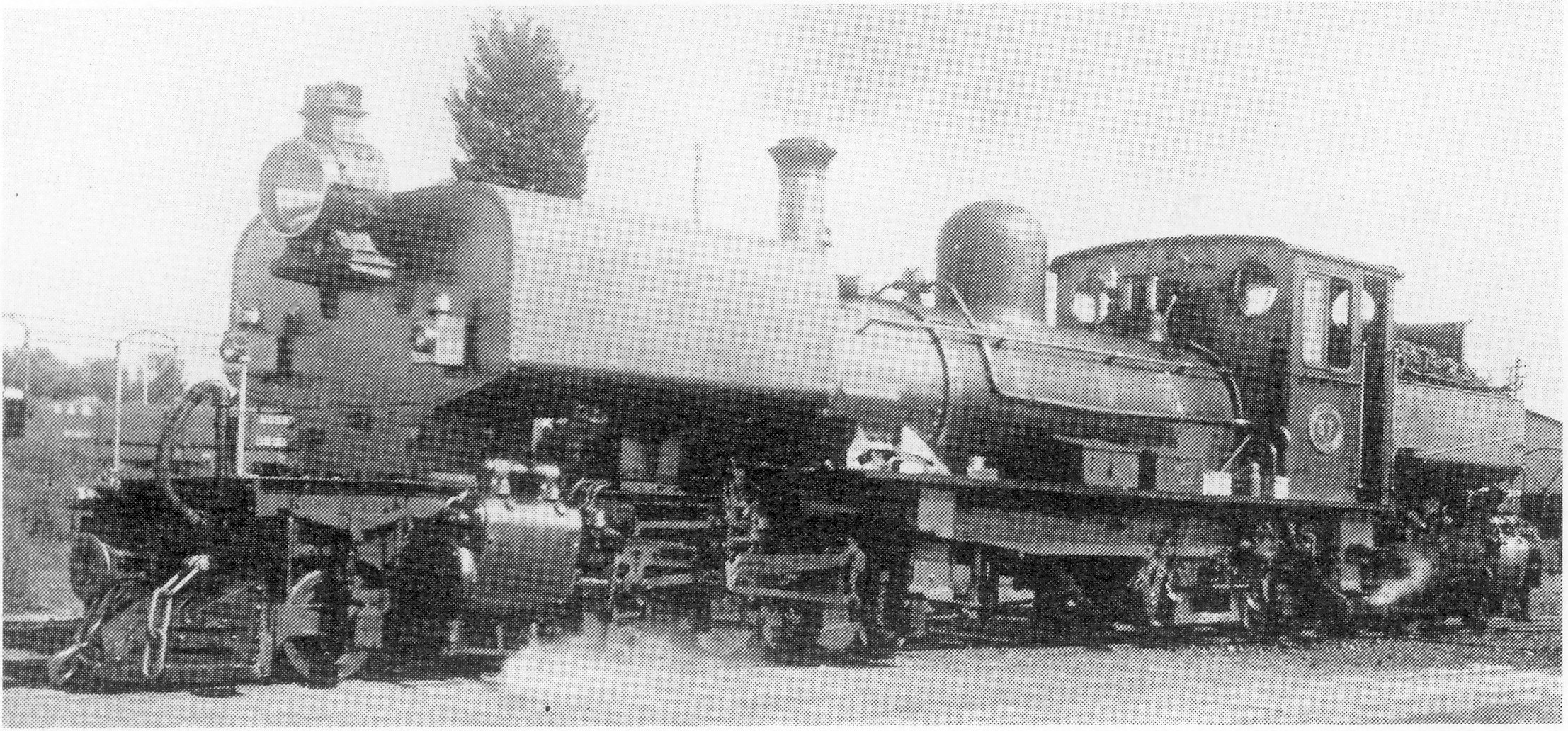
South African Railways Class NG G12

- In 1927, two Class NG G12 Garratts entered service, the smallest Garratts to see service in South Africa. Ordered from BP in 1927, their construction was sub-contracted to Belgian locomotive builders Société Franco-Belge. They were superheated, with outside plate frames, Walschaerts valve gear and round-topped fireboxes.
- In 1927 and 1928, twelve Class NG G13 Garratts entered service on the Langkloof and Harding narrow gauge lines. Designed and built by Hannoversche Maschinenbau AG (Hanomag) in consultation with the SAR, the type was to become the standard narrow gauge Garratt in South Africa for the next forty years. They were superheated, with outside bar frames and round-topped fireboxes, and with an extremely compact arrangement of Walschaerts valve gear. The leading wheels were arranged as conventional pony trucks, while the inner trailing wheels were built to the Gölsdorf system which allowed the axle some lateral movement.
- In 1931, a single light Class NG G14 Garratt entered service. Built by Hanomag in 1930, it was similar to but slightly larger than the Class NG G12, also superheated but with larger bore cylinders, an outside bar frame and a round-topped firebox.

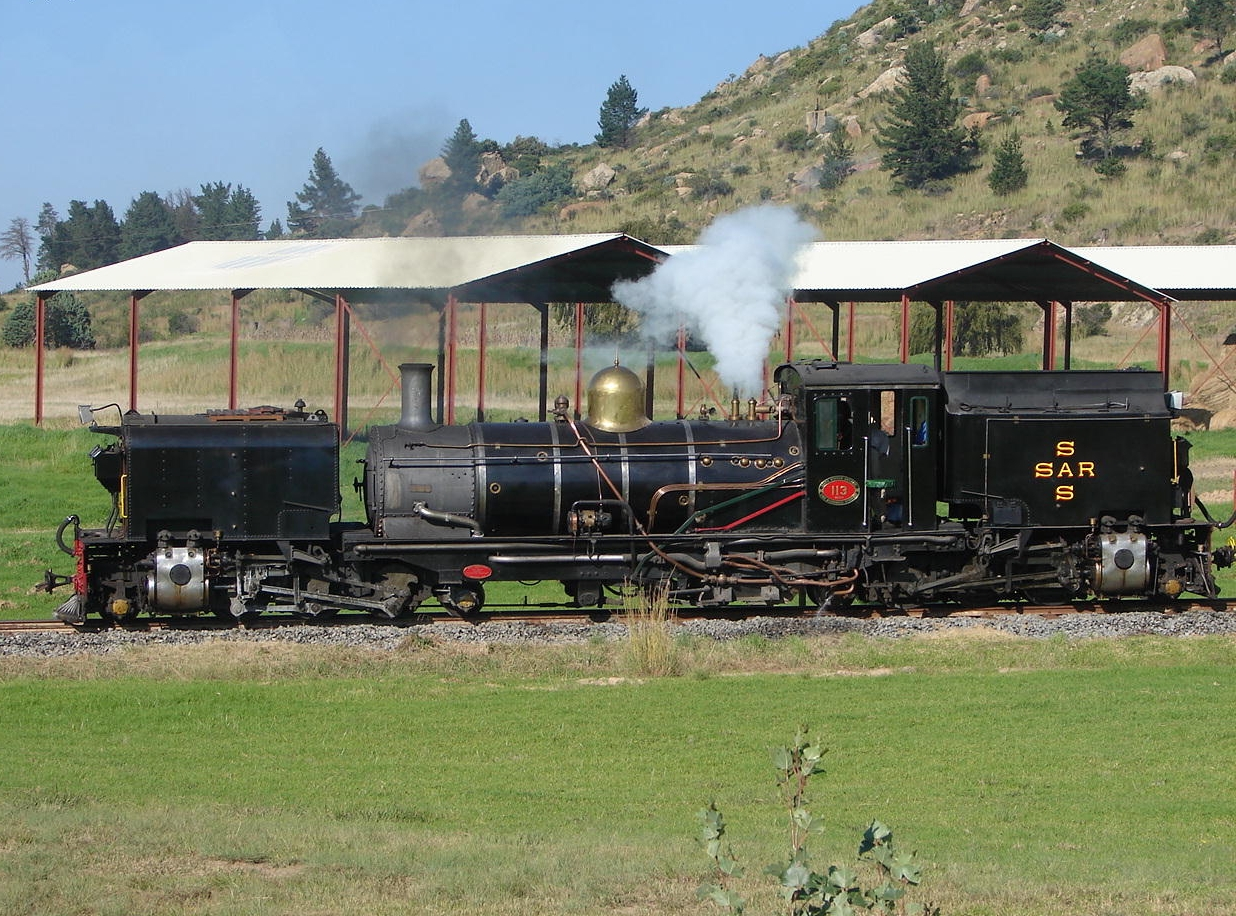
South African Railways Class NG G16 no. 113

- Between 1937 and 1968, 34 Class NG G16 Garratts were placed in service, spread over five orders from three manufacturers. It was almost identical to the Class NG G13, but with all leading and trailing wheels fitted with roller bearing axle boxes and arranged as pony trucks. Société Anonyme John Cockerill of Belgium delivered four in 1937. Another 22 were built by BP in 1939, 1951 and 1958, the last seven being the last steam locomotives to be built by BP. The final eight locomotives in 1968 were the last new steam locomotives to be ordered by the SAR and were built by Hunslet-Taylor in Germiston, Transvaal.
- In 1989 and 1990, two Class NG G16 Garratts were rebuilt by the Alfred County Railway to incorporate a gas producing combustion system (GPCS) and were reclassified to Class NG G16A. The rebuilding was done by mechanical engineer Phil Girdlestone, using technology similar to that used by mechanical engineer David Wardale in the creation of the Class 26 Red Devil in 1980.

=== Southern Rhodesia ===
With altogether 46 locomotives of this wheel arrangement, all built by BP, the second largest user of the 2-6-2+2-6-2 Garratt was the Rhodesia Railways (RR) of Southern Rhodesia, which also operated in Northern Rhodesia and Mozambique.

In 1926, twelve 13th Class 2-6-2+2-6-2 Garratts were ordered by the Beira and Mashonaland and Rhodesia Railways (BMR). They were based at Umtali in Southern Rhodesia to work the difficult section of the Beira line into Mozambique between Umtali and Vila Machado. In 1930, these locomotives were replaced on this duty by 14th Class Garratts, after which they were mainly based at Salisbury in Southern Rhodesia until their withdrawal from service.

The 13th class also operated in Northern Rhodesia, with a couple being allocated for short periods to Livingstone. Two locomotives were also hired out to the Rhokana Corporation copper mine at Nkana in Kitwe, Northern Rhodesia. These two locomotives were eventually purchased by the mine, one coming to a tragic end in 1950 when it struck a lorry loaded with explosives at a level crossing, causing many deaths since the train carried miners going on shift in an open wagon.

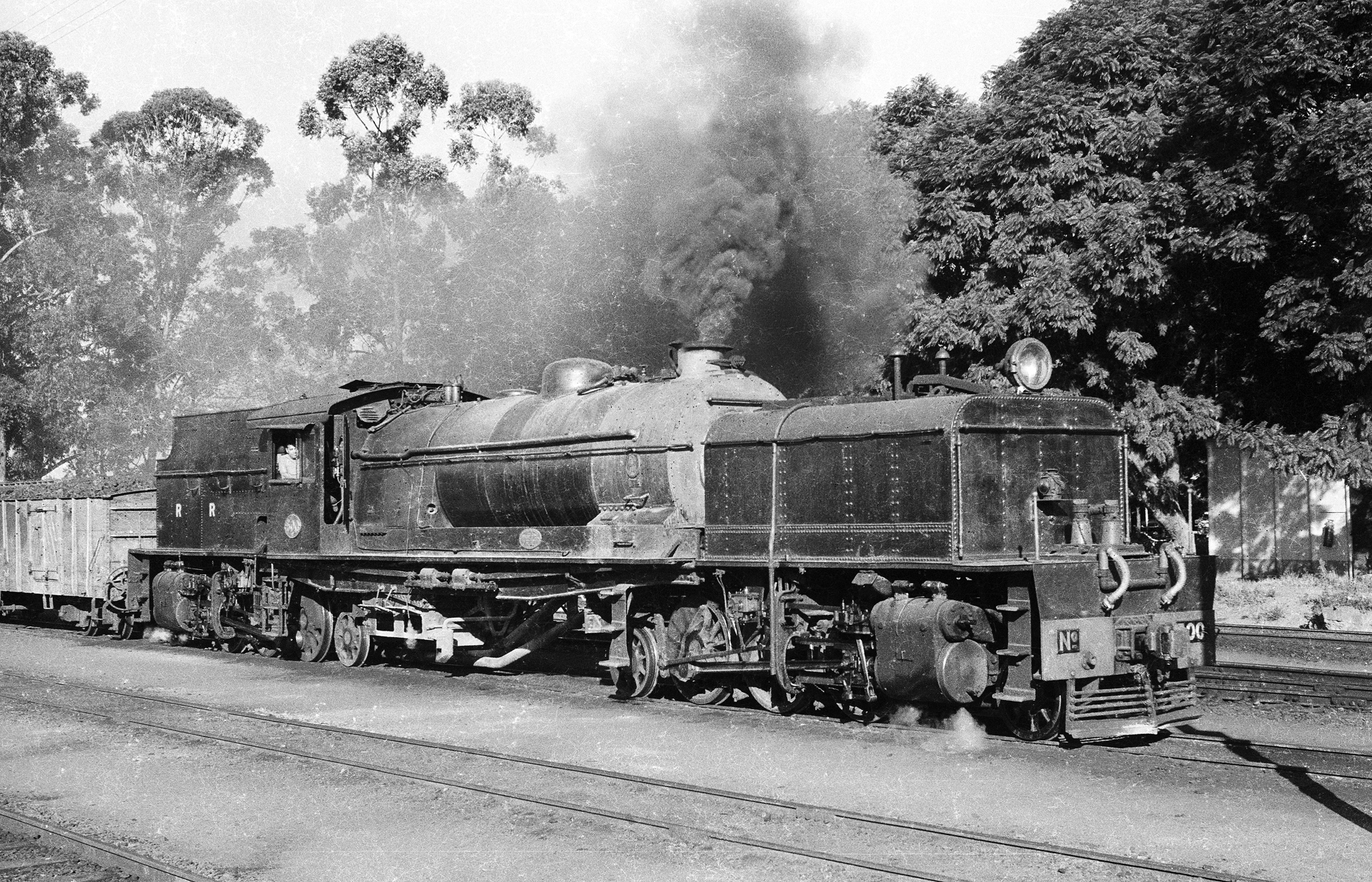
RR 14th class no 500

In 1929, the success of the 13th Class led to an improved version being ordered by RR, which the BMR had now become. While of the same wheel arrangement and similar power output as the 13th class locomotives, these sixteen had, amongst other improvements, bar instead of plate frames and round-topped instead of Belpaire fireboxes. These were designated the 14th Class and all of them were initially allocated to Umtali to replace the 13th class Garratts on the line to Vila Machado in Mozambique. From 1939, some of the class were transferred for branchline work in Southern Rhodesia at the Salisbury, Bulawayo and Gwelo depots.

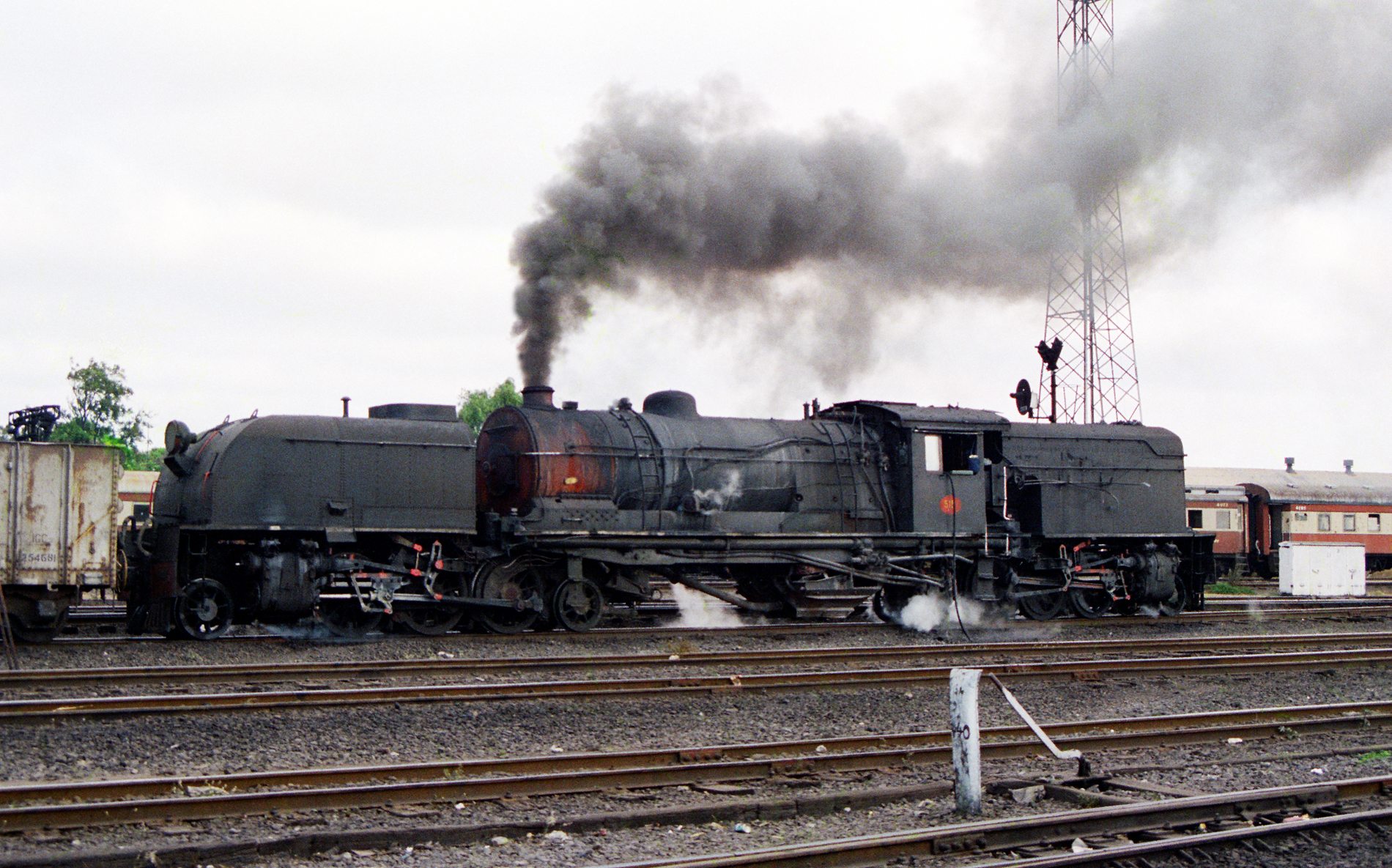
NRZ 14A class no 515

In October 1949, the Beira line in Mozambique was taken over by the state-owned Caminhos de Ferro de Moçambique (CFM). At the same time, the CFM purchased a number of locomotives from RR, including eight 14th Class Garratts, which continued to work on the Beira line from the new depot at Gondola in Mozambique.

In 1950, RR ordered a modernised version of the 14th Class for branchline work in Southern Rhodesia. There were eighteen of them and they were designated the 14A Class. From 1979, they were refurbished for shunting work, receiving roller bearings on the driving and coupled axles and, in many cases, larger water tanks and coal bunkers. By 2012 this class, now on the roster of the National Railways of Zimbabwe, still saw occasional service on Bulawayo shunt duties.
