= South African Class GG 2-6-2+2-6-2 =

1925 articulated steam locomotive

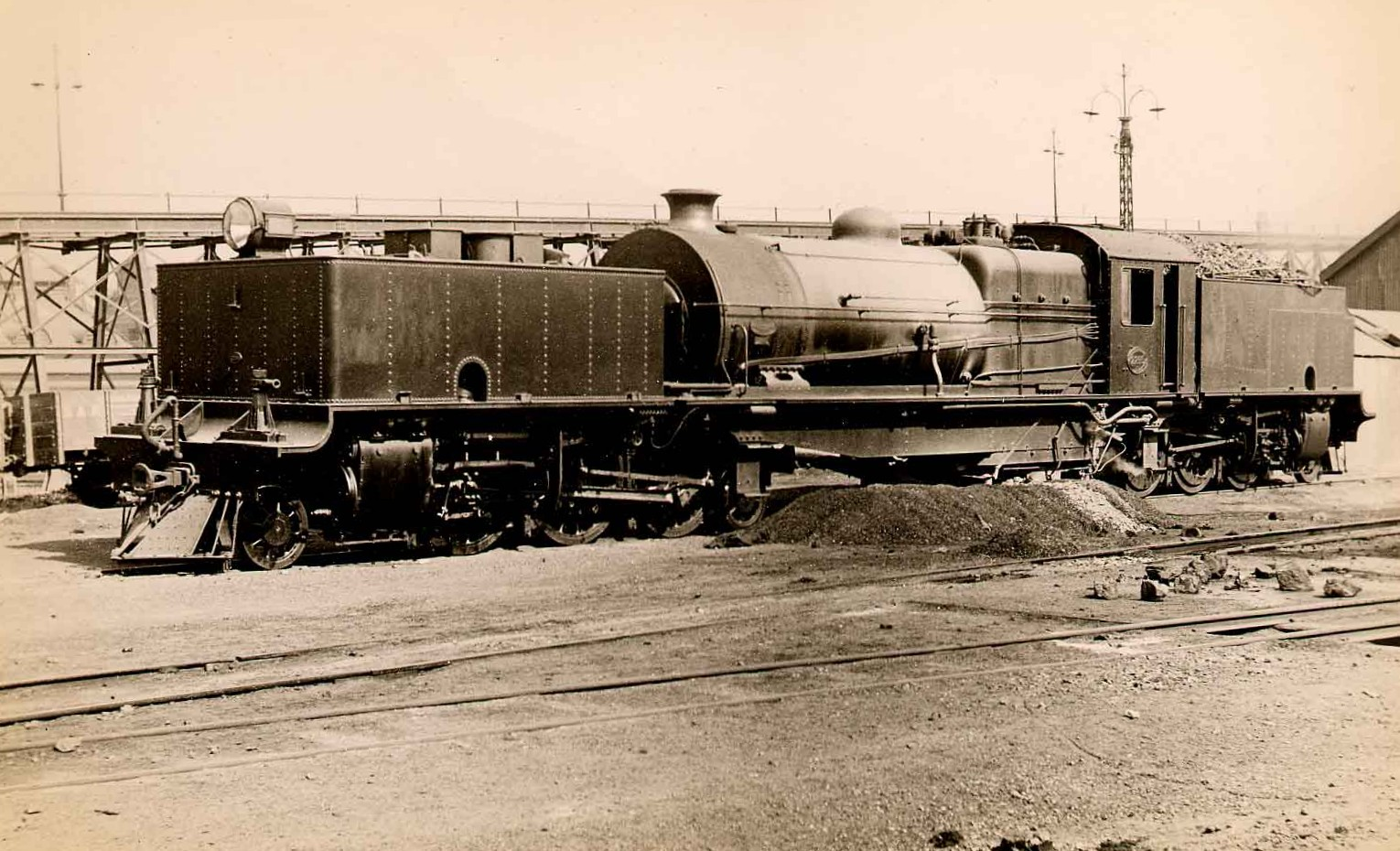
- GG no. 2290 at Cape Town, c. 1930
Type and origin
- Power type: Steam
- Designer: Beyer, Peacock & Company
- Builder: Beyer, Peacock & Company
- Serial number: 6232
- Model: Class GG
- Build date: 1925
- Total produced: 1
Specifications
- Configuration
  - Whyte: 2-6-2+2-6-2 (Double Prairie)
  - UIC: 1'C1'+1'C1'h4
- Driver: 3rd & 4th coupled axles
- Gauge: 3 ft 6 in (1,067 mm) Cape gauge
- Leading dia.: 30 in (762 mm)
- Coupled dia.: 57 in (1,448 mm)
- Trailing dia.: 30 in (762 mm)
- Wheelbase: 67 ft 4 in (20,523 mm)
  - Engine: 21 ft 4 1/2 in (6,515 mm) each
  - Coupled: 10 ft (3,048 mm) each
- Pivot centres: 35 ft 4 in (10,770 mm)
- Length
  - Over couplers: 74 ft 2 3/4 in (22,625 mm)
- Height: 12 ft 11 7/16 in (3,948 mm)
- Frame type: Plate
- Axle load: 16 LT 4 cwt (16,460 kg)
  - Leading: 13 LT 13 cwt (13,870 kg) front 14 LT 5 cwt (14,480 kg) rear
  - 1st coupled: 15 LT 3 cwt (15,390 kg)
  - 2nd coupled: 15 LT 14 cwt (15,950 kg)
  - 3rd coupled: 15 LT 15 cwt (16,000 kg)
  - 4th coupled: 16 LT 4 cwt (16,460 kg)
  - 5th coupled: 15 LT 19 cwt (16,210 kg)
  - 6th coupled: 15 LT 15 cwt (16,000 kg)
  - Trailing: 12 LT 12 cwt (12,800 kg) front 12 LT 5 cwt (12,450 kg) rear
- Adhesive weight: 94 LT 10 cwt (96,020 kg)
- Loco weight: 147 LT 15 cwt (150,100 kg)
- Fuel type: Coal
- Fuel capacity: 10 LT (10.2 t)
- Water cap.: 3,500 imp gal (15,900 L) front 1,100 imp gal (5,000 L) rear
- Firebox
  - Type: Belpaire
  - Grate area: 52 sq ft (4.8 m^{2})
- Boiler
  - Pitch: 7 ft 9 in (2,362 mm)
  - Diameter: 6 ft 9 in (2,057 mm)
  - Tube plates: 11 ft 8 5/8 in (3,572 mm)
  - Small tubes: 288: 2 in (51 mm)
  - Large tubes: 36: 5 1/2 in (140 mm)
- Boiler pressure: 180 psi (1,241 kPa)
- Safety valve: Ramsbottom
- Heating surface
  - Firebox: 215 sq ft (20.0 m^{2})
  - Tubes: 2,374 sq ft (220.6 m^{2})
  - Total surface: 2,589 sq ft (240.5 m^{2})
- Superheater
  - Heating area: 362 sq ft (33.6 m^{2})
- Cylinders: Four
- Cylinder size: 18 in (457 mm) bore 26 in (660 mm) stroke
- Valve gear: Walschaerts
- Valve type: Piston
- Couplers: Johnston link-and-pin
Performance figures
- Maximum speed: 57 mph (92 km/h)
- Tractive effort: 39,900 lbf (177 kN) @ 75%
Career
- Operators: South African Railways
- Class: Class GG
- Number in class: 1
- Numbers: 2290
- Delivered: 1925
- First run: 1925
- Withdrawn: 1938
- Scrapped: 1947

The South African Railways Class GG 2-6-2+2-6-2 of 1925 was an articulated steam locomotive.

In 1925, the South African Railways placed a single Class GG Garratt articulated steam locomotive with a 2-6-2+2-6-2 Double Prairie type wheel arrangement in fast mainline passenger service.

== Manufacturers ==
The Class GG 2-6-2+2-6-2 Double Prairie type Garratt locomotive was a development of the Class GB. It was designed for the South African Railways (SAR) with large coupled wheels for fast passenger service on mainline duties. A single locomotive, no. 2290, was delivered from Beyer, Peacock & Company in 1925. It was superheated, with a plate frame, a Belpaire firebox and Walschaerts valve gear. The Class GG was the only Garratt locomotive on the SAR that was intended primarily for passenger working.

== Characteristics ==
At 57 inches (1,448 millimetres) diameter, the Class GG had the largest coupled wheels yet seen on a Garratt locomotive in South Africa. An innovation was a coal pusher at the back of the coal bunker, designed to ease the work of the fireman by pushing the coal forward to the front of the bunker when required. It was the only instance of this appliance being used on any SAR locomotive.

To keep costs down, the cylinders were not enlarged to compensate for the increased wheel diameter. As a result, the locomotive's tractive effort was inferior to that of the Class 15CA which was introduced on the same line between Touws River and De Aar a year later.

The locomotive was capable of speeds of 57 miles per hour (92 kilometres per hour), but it was found to be unsteady at high speed due to the absence of a leading bogie on each engine unit. It could handle a load of 1,245 long tons (1,265 tonnes) on 1 in 80 (1¼%) gradients and hauled 340 long tons (345 tonnes) up the 15 miles (24 kilometres) of 1 in 40 (2½%) gradient of the Hex River Railpass in sixty-two minutes without the help of the usual banking locomotive.

== Service ==
It was initially placed in service at Touws River and employed to work the Union Limited and Union Express fast passenger trains south of De Aar, but because of its unsteadiness at speed it was taken off fast passenger traffic and demoted to ordinary passenger and goods train working out of Cape Town. No more Class GG locomotives were ordered and since it was a non-standard locomotive, it was staged by 1938 and scrapped in 1947.

== Illustration ==
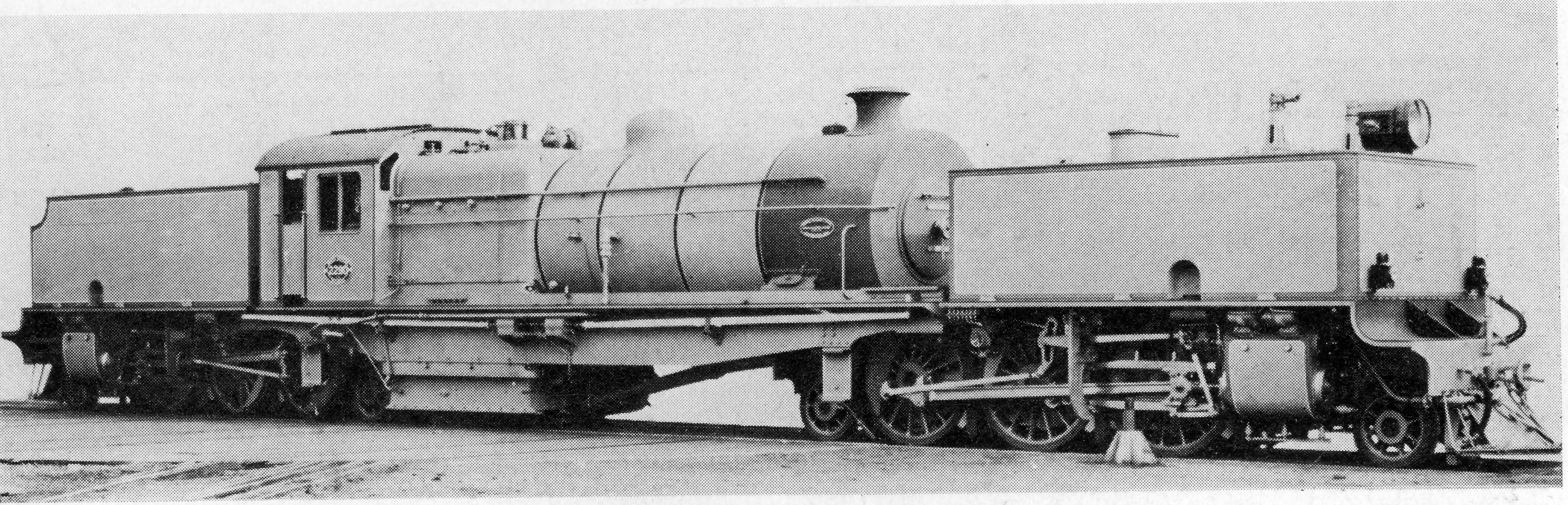
No. 2290 as delivered, c. 1925
