= South African Class GC 2-6-2+2-6-2 =

1924 articulated steam locomotive

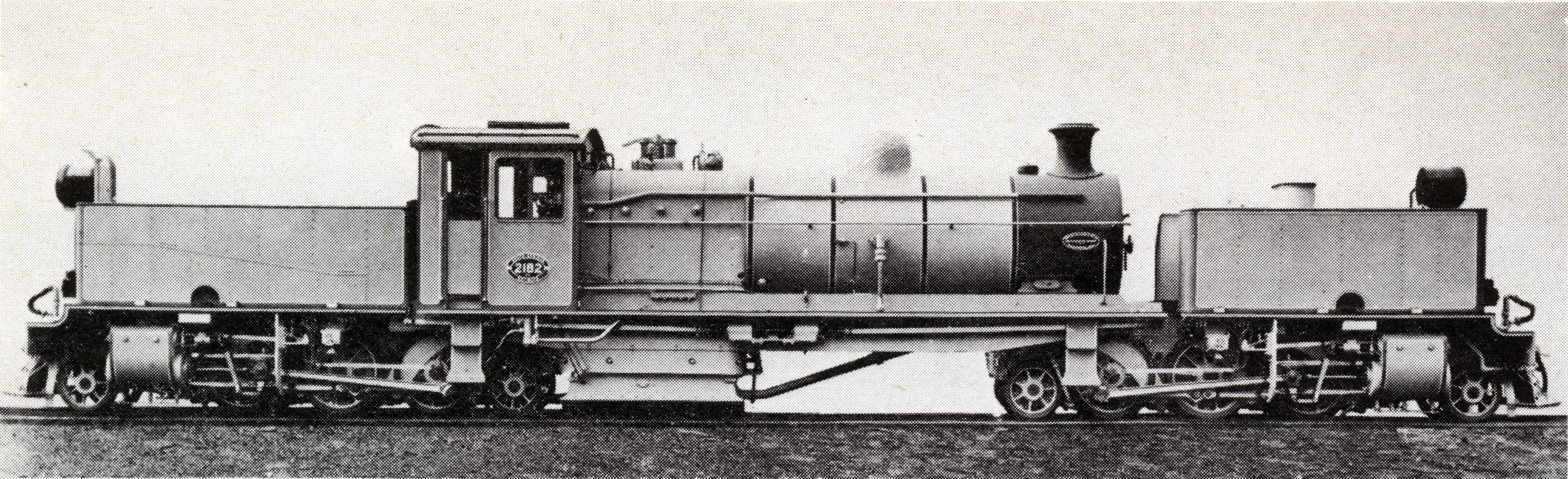
- Class GC no. 2182, c. 1924
Type and origin
- Power type: Steam
- Designer: Beyer, Peacock & Company
- Builder: Beyer, Peacock & Company
- Serial number: 6187–6192
- Model: Class GC
- Build date: 1924
- Total produced: 6
Specifications
- Configuration
  - Whyte: 2-6-2+2-6-2 (Double Prairie)
  - UIC: 1'C1'+1'C1'h4
- Driver: 3rd & 4th coupled axles
- Gauge: 3 ft 6 in (1,067 mm) Cape gauge
- Leading dia.: 28 1/2 in (724 mm)
- Coupled dia.: 42 3/4 in (1,086 mm)
- Trailing dia.: 28 1/2 in (724 mm)
- Wheelbase: 56 ft 8 in (17,272 mm)
  - Engine: 17 ft 8 1/4 in (5,391 mm) each
  - Coupled: 8 ft (2,438 mm) each
- Pivot centres: 29 ft 8 in (9,042 mm)
- Length
  - Over couplers: 63 ft 3 3/4 in (19,298 mm)
- Height: 12 ft 3 in (3,734 mm)
- Frame type: Plate
- Axle load: 11 LT 16 cwt (11,990 kg)
  - Leading: 8 LT 13 cwt (8,789 kg) front 8 LT 9 cwt (8,586 kg) rear
  - 1st coupled: 10 LT 16 cwt (10,970 kg)
  - 2nd coupled: 10 LT 14 cwt (10,870 kg)
  - 3rd coupled: 10 LT 14 cwt (10,870 kg)
  - 4th coupled: 11 LT 15 cwt (11,940 kg)
  - 5th coupled: 11 LT 16 cwt (11,990 kg)
  - 6th coupled: 10 LT 11 cwt (10,720 kg)
  - Trailing: 6 LT 8 cwt (6,503 kg) front 7 LT 2 cwt (7,214 kg) rear
- Adhesive weight: 66 LT 6 cwt (67,360 kg)
- Loco weight: 96 LT 18 cwt (98,450 kg)
- Fuel type: Coal
- Fuel capacity: 7 LT (7.1 t)
- Water cap.: 2,000 imp gal (9,090 L) front 1,000 imp gal (4,550 L) rear
- Firebox
  - Type: Belpaire
  - Grate area: 34 sq ft (3.2 m^{2})
- Boiler
  - Pitch: 7 ft 4 3/8 in (2,245 mm)
  - Diameter: 5 ft 2 in (1,575 mm)
  - Tube plates: 11 ft 3 5/8 in (3,445 mm)
  - Small tubes: 149: 2 in (51 mm)
  - Large tubes: 24: 5 1/2 in (140 mm)
- Boiler pressure: 180 psi (1,241 kPa)
- Safety valve: Ramsbottom
- Heating surface
  - Firebox: 156.8 sq ft (14.57 m^{2})
  - Tubes: 1,266.2 sq ft (117.63 m^{2})
  - Total surface: 1,423 sq ft (132.2 m^{2})
- Superheater
  - Heating area: 247 sq ft (22.9 m^{2})
- Cylinders: 4
- Cylinder size: 14 in (356 mm) bore 23 in (584 mm) stroke
- Valve gear: Walschaerts
- Valve type: Piston
- Couplers: Johnston link-and-pin AAR knuckle (1930s)
Performance figures
- Tractive effort: 28,470 lbf (126.6 kN) @ 75%
Career
- Operators: South African Railways
- Class: Class GC
- Number in class: 6
- Numbers: 2180–2185
- Delivered: 1924/25
- First run: 1924
- Withdrawn: 1962

The South African Railways Class GC 2-6-2+2-6-2 of 1924 was an articulated steam locomotive.

In 1924 and 1925, the South African Railways placed six Class GC Garratt articulated steam locomotives with a 2-6-2+2-6-2 Double Prairie type wheel arrangement in branch line service.

== Manufacturer ==
Following the good performance of the Class GB branch line Garratts, the first locomotive to be built to the specifications of F.R. Collins after he was appointed as the chief mechanical engineer of the South African Railways in 1922 was a heavier 2-6-2+2-6-2 Double Prairie type Garratt, also intended for branch line work. It was designed and built to his specifications by Beyer, Peacock & Company in 1924.

== Characteristics ==
Six locomotives were delivered in 1924 and were erected in the Durban shops of the SAR. They were placed in service in 1924 and 1925, designated Class GC and numbered in the range from 2180 to 2185. The locomotives were superheated, with Belpaire fireboxes, plate frames, Walschaerts valve gear and piston valves.

Like its predecessor Class GB, the heavier Class GC was also a branch line locomotive and its maximum axle load of 11 long tons 16 hundredweight (11,990 kilograms) made it suitable for light rail. It was a more powerful development of the Class GB and was very similar to the Class GK Garratts which had been acquired by the New Cape Central Railway in 1923, but 2 long tons (2,032 kilograms) heavier and with 1 inch (25 millimetres) smaller diameter cylinders with a 1 inch (25 millimetres) longer stroke.

== Service ==
The locomotives were initially placed in service on the Natal South Coast line. Although they later also worked on other branch lines, they spent their entire working lives in Natal until they were withdrawn from service in 1962.
