= South African Class GCA 2-6-2+2-6-2 =

1927 articulated steam locomotive

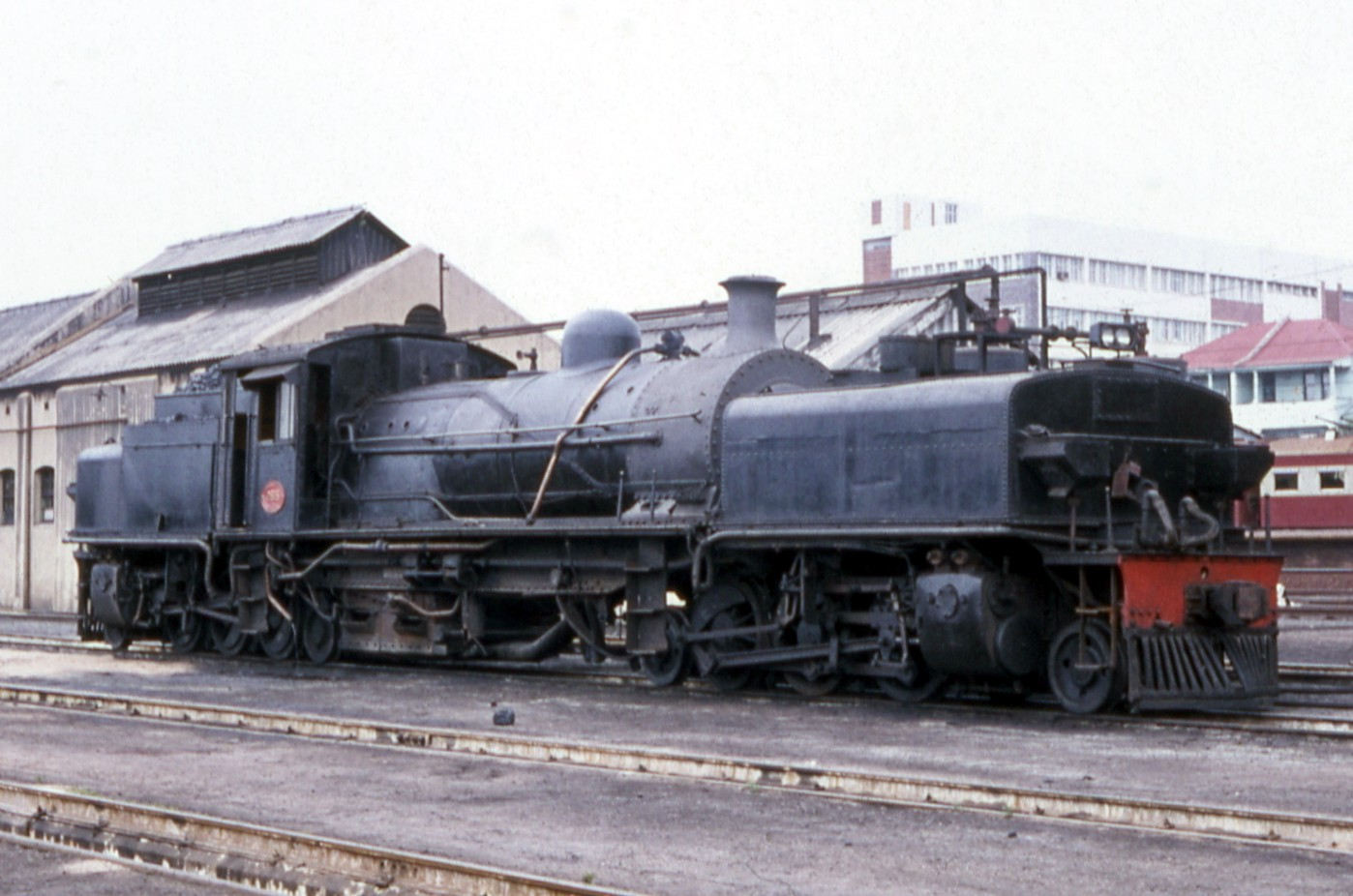
- No. 2615 at Greyville, November 1971
Type and origin
- ♠ First order – ♥ Second order
- Power type: Steam
- Designer: South African Railways (Col F.R. Collins DSO)
- Builder: Friedrich Krupp AG
- Serial number: 970–982, 1042–1068
- Model: Class GCA
- Build date: 1927–1928
- Total produced: 39
Specifications
- Configuration
  - Whyte: 2-6-2+2-6-2 (Double Prairie)
  - UIC: 1'C1'+1'C1'h4t
- Driver: 3rd & 4th coupled axles
- Gauge: 3 ft 6 in (1,067 mm) Cape gauge
- Leading dia.: 28 1/2 in (724 mm)
- Coupled dia.: 42 3/4 in (1,086 mm)
- Trailing dia.: 28 1/2 in (724 mm)
- Wheelbase: 56 ft 8 in (17,272 mm)
  - Engine: 17 ft 8 1/4 in (5,391 mm) each
  - Coupled: 8 ft (2,438 mm) each
- Pivot centres: 29 ft 8 in (9,042 mm)
- Length
  - Over couplers: 64 ft 9 in (19,736 mm)
- Height: 12 ft 7 in (3,835 mm)
- Frame type: Bar
- Axle load: ♠ 11 LT 16 cwt (11,990 kg) ♥ 11 LT 14 cwt (11,890 kg)
  - Leading: ♠ 10 LT 2 cwt (10,260 kg) front 10 LT 17 cwt (11,020 kg) rear ♥ 10 LT 10 cwt (10,670 kg) front 10 LT 9 cwt (10,620 kg) rear
  - 1st coupled: ♠ 10 LT 19 cwt (11,130 kg) ♥ 10 LT 16 cwt (10,970 kg)
  - 2nd coupled: ♠ 10 LT 12 cwt (10,770 kg) ♥ 10 LT 19 cwt (11,130 kg)
  - 3rd coupled: ♠ 10 LT 12 cwt (10,770 kg) ♥ 10 LT 19 cwt (11,130 kg)
  - 4th coupled: ♠ 11 LT 2 cwt (11,280 kg) ♥ 11 LT 13 cwt (11,840 kg)
  - 5th coupled: ♠ 11 LT 2 cwt (11,280 kg) ♥ 11 LT 14 cwt (11,890 kg)
  - 6th coupled: ♠ 11 LT 16 cwt (11,990 kg) ♥ 10 LT 16 cwt (10,970 kg)
  - Trailing: ♠ 8 LT 8 cwt (8,535 kg) front 8 LT 16 cwt (8,941 kg) rear ♥ 8 LT 14 cwt (8,840 kg) front 9 LT 6 cwt (9,449 kg) rear
- Adhesive weight: ♠ 66 LT 3 cwt (67,210 kg) ♥ 66 LT 17 cwt (67,920 kg)
- Loco weight: ♠ 104 LT 6 cwt (106,000 kg) ♥ 105 LT 16 cwt (107,500 kg)
- Fuel type: Coal
- Fuel capacity: 7 LT (7.1 t)
- Water cap.: 2,000 imp gal (9,090 L) front 1,000 imp gal (4,550 L) rear
- Firebox
  - Type: Round top
  - Grate area: 34 sq ft (3.2 m^{2})
- Boiler
  - Pitch: 7 ft 4 3/8 in (2,245 mm)
  - Diameter: 5 ft 2 in (1,575 mm)
  - Tube plates: 11 ft 3 5/8 in (3,445 mm)
  - Small tubes: 141: 2 in (51 mm)
  - Large tubes: 24: 5 1/2 in (140 mm)
- Boiler pressure: 180 psi (1,241 kPa)
- Safety valve: Pop
- Heating surface
  - Firebox: 142 sq ft (13.2 m^{2})
  - Tubes: 1,225 sq ft (113.8 m^{2})
  - Arch tubes: 21 sq ft (2.0 m^{2})
  - Total surface: 1,388 sq ft (128.9 m^{2})
- Superheater
  - Heating area: 331 sq ft (30.8 m^{2})
- Cylinders: Four
- Cylinder size: 14 in (356 mm) bore 23 in (584 mm) stroke
- Valve gear: Heusinger
- Valve type: Piston
- Couplers: AAR knuckle
Performance figures
- Tractive effort: 28,470 lbf (126.6 kN) @ 75%
Career
- Operators: South African Railways
- Class: Class GCA
- Number in class: 39
- Numbers: 2190–2202, 2600–2625
- Delivered: 1927–1928
- First run: 1927
- Withdrawn: 1975

The South African Railways Class GCA 2-6-2+2-6-2 of 1927 was an articulated steam locomotive.

In 1927, the South African Railways placed thirteen Class GCA Garratt articulated steam locomotives with a 2-6-2+2-6-2 Double Prairie type wheel arrangement in branch line service. Another batch of twenty-six locomotives was acquired in 1928.

== Manufacturer ==
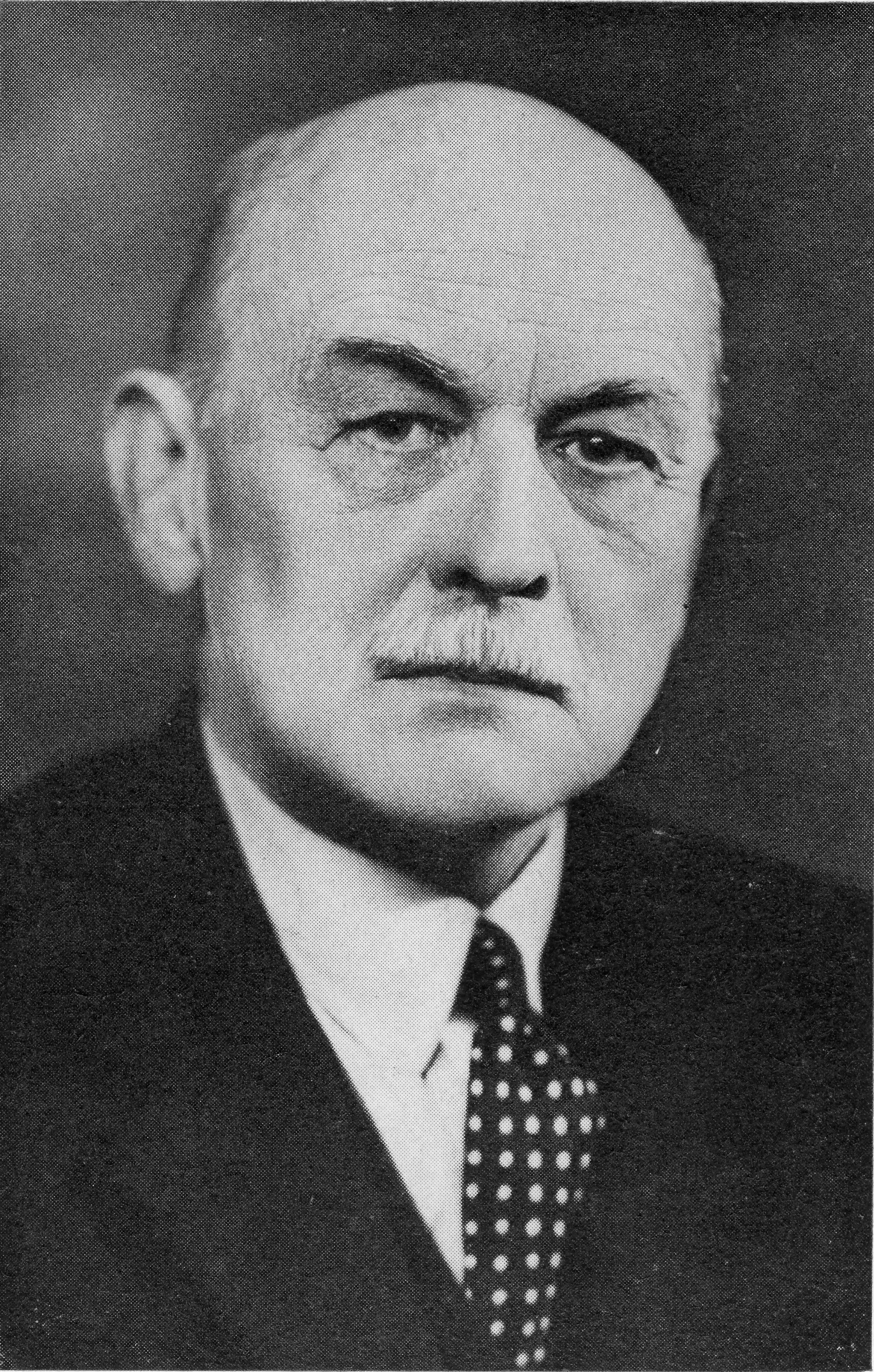
Col F.R. Collins DSO

The Class GCA 2-6-2+2-6-2 Double Prairie type Garratt steam locomotive was built to the specifications and design of Colonel F.R. Collins DSO, Chief Mechanical Engineer of the South African Railways (SAR), based on the design of the Class GC Garratt. Thirteen locomotives were ordered from Friedrich Krupp AG of Essen in Germany, who delivered them during October 1927, numbered in the range from 2190 to 2202.

A second order for another 26 locomotives was placed with the same manufacturer in 1928. These were numbered in the range from 2600 to 2625 when they were delivered during August in that same year.

== Characteristics ==
The Class GCA had the same tractive effort and main dimensions as the Class GC, but was built on bar frames instead of plate frames. They also differed in general appearance by having round-topped fireboxes, compared to the Belpaire fireboxes of the Class GC, and with water tanks and built-up coal bunkers of a different shape. The second batch of locomotives differed slightly from the first and were 1 long ton 10 hundredweight (1,524 kilograms) heavier. Like the predecessor Class GC, they were all superheated and had Walschaerts valve gear.

The Class GCA proved to be good locomotives, although some trouble was experienced with coupling rods breaking, much of which was attributed to running them at excessive speed to maintain schedules with their small coupled wheel diameter of only 42 3/4 inches (1,086 millimetres).

Experience showed that the performance of these locomotives could have been better if they had been fitted with somewhat larger cylinders since their boilers still had an appreciable margin of capacity.

== Service ==
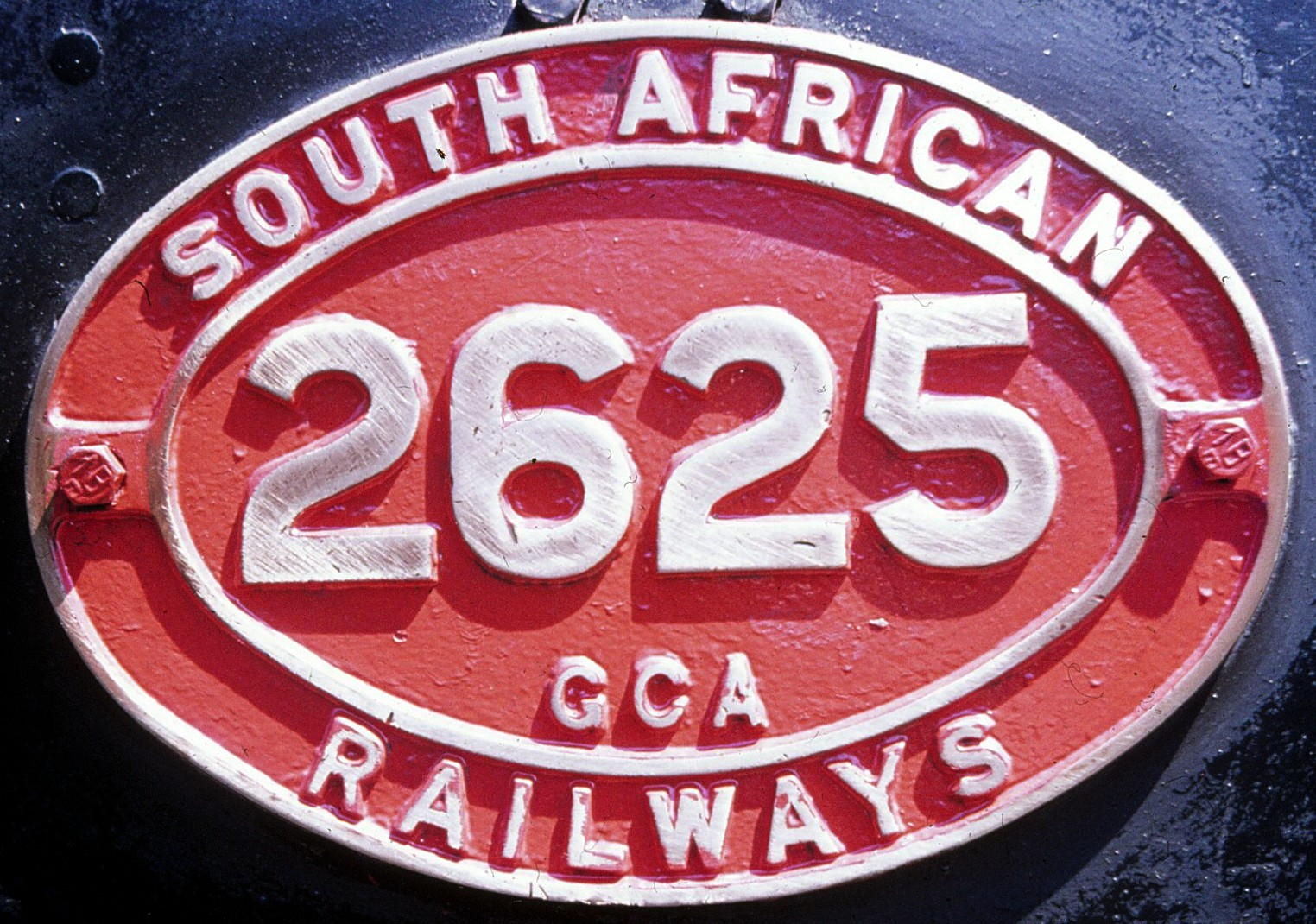
English only

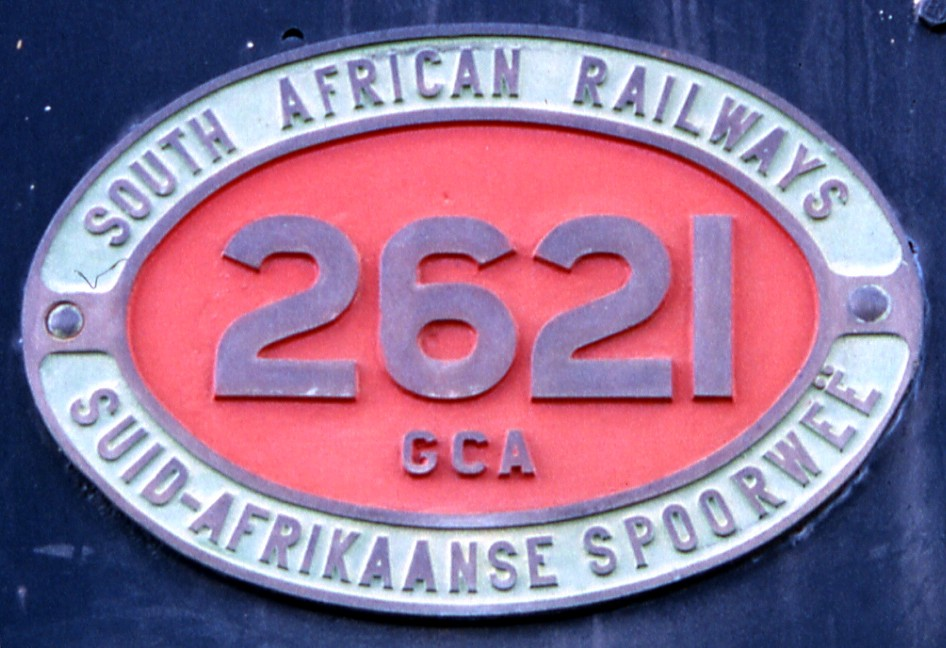
Bilingual

The first batch of locomotives were placed in service on the Natal South Coast line and shedded at Greyville, while the second batch were distributed wherever their services were required. These could be found working around Pietermaritzburg on the Donnybrook to Underberg and Greytown to Mount Alida branch lines, while some ended up at Nelspruit in the Eastern Transvaal Lowveld for service on the Graskop branch line. They were even tested on the South West Africa System.

By October 1971, after more than four decades of service, all Greyville's Class GCAs had been withdrawn since they were no longer needed after completion of the South Coast line's electrification. By 1973, the thirty-nine original members of the Class had dwindled to seven, all stationed at Mason's Mill in Pietermaritzburg, from where they still worked the light rail Underberg branch, often double-heading. By April of that year, however, the number had dropped to five. They were all withdrawn from service in October 1975. One of their last tasks was to work the track re-railing train which laid the heavier rails which enabled diesel-electric locomotives to finally replace them.

== Knuckle couplers ==
In 1927, the SAR began to convert the couplers of its Cape Gauge rolling stock from the Johnston link-and-pin coupling system which had been in use since the establishment of the Cape Government Railways in 1873, to AAR knuckle couplers. Judging from contemporary photographs as well as the official SAR Locomotive Diagram Book and the dimensional locomotive drawings as published by Holland, which were for the most part based on the original as-delivered and unmodified locomotives, the Class GCA locomotives were delivered new with knuckle couplers fitted, as were the Classes 18, GF, HF and U which also entered service in 1927.

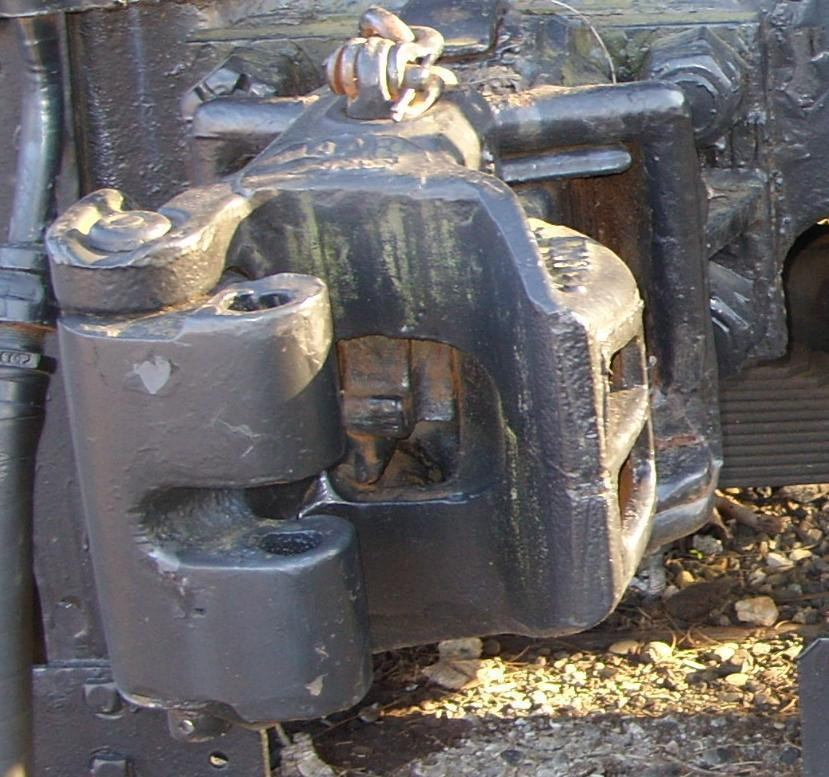
Transition era knuckle coupler

Conversion of all rolling stock would take several years and both coupler types could still be seen on rolling stock into the late 1950s. During the transition period, knuckle couplers on locomotives had a horizontal gap and a vertical hole in the knuckle itself to accommodate a link and a pin respectively. This enabled them to couple to vehicles which were still equipped with the older Johnston couplers.

Knuckle couplers had first been used in South Africa more than two decades earlier. The Central South African Railways (CSAR) introduced Gould knuckle couplers on the rolling stock of its Limited Express and Imperial Mail passenger trains in 1904. The Limited Express operated between Pretoria and Johannesburg while the Imperial Mail operated between Pretoria and Cape Town. These knuckle-couplers also had split knuckles to accommodate coupling to the old Johnston couplers with a link and pin, since the CSAR retained the old couplers on all their locomotives to keep them compatible with their own goods and older passenger rolling stock as well as with that from the other railways it connected with.

== Preservation ==
Number	Works nmr	THF / Private	Leaselend / Owner	Current Location	Outside South Africa	?
2196		THF		White River Station		
2199		THF		Krugersdorp Locomotive Depot		
2621		THF	Ingwe Municipality	Creighton Station		

== Illustration ==
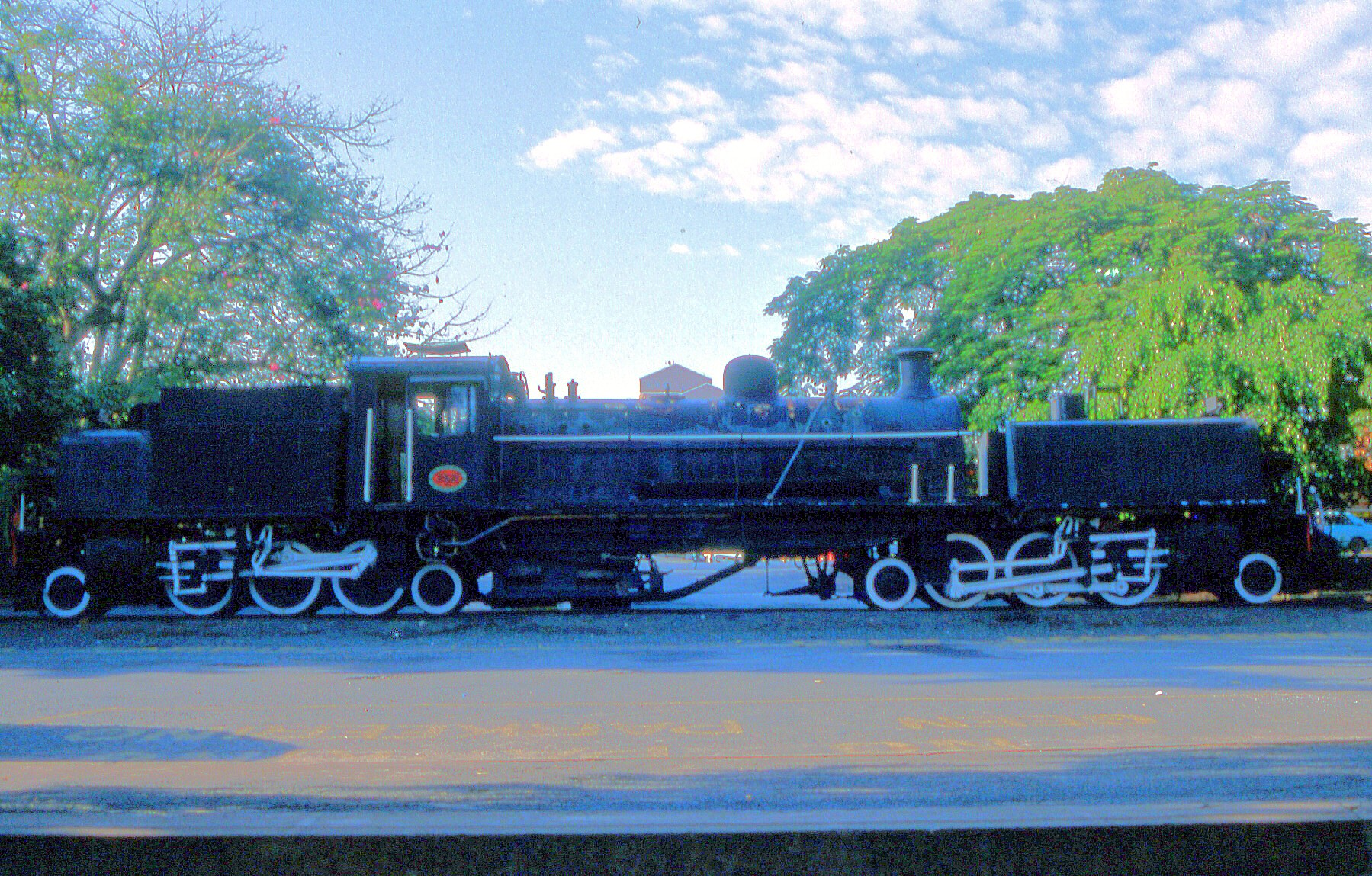
No. 2621, plinthed at Nelspruit, April 1991. Later this locomotive was removed from the plinth and stored at Waterval – Boven. In 2016, it was moved to Creighton to be restored to operating condition by the Paton's Country Railway.
