= Tasmanian Government Railways L class =

Type and origin
- Power type: Steam
- Builder: Beyer, Peacock & Company
- Serial number: 5525, 5526
- Build date: 1912
- Total produced: 2
Specifications
- Configuration
  - Whyte: 2-6-2+2-6-2
- Gauge: 1,067 mm (3 ft 6 in)
- Driver dia.: 3 ft 6 in (1,067 mm)
- Total weight: 90 long tons 0 cwt (201,600 lb or 91.4 t)
- Fuel type: Coal
- Boiler pressure: 160 lbf/in^{2} (1.10 MPa)
- Cylinder size: 15 in × 22 in (381 mm × 559 mm)
Performance figures
- Tractive effort: 30,171 lbf (134.21 kN)
Career
- Operators: Tasmanian Government Railways
- Numbers: L1-L2
- Withdrawn: 1945
- Disposition: Both withdrawn and scrapped

The Tasmanian Government Railways L class was a class 2 of 2-6-2+2-6-2 Garratt locomotives operated by the Tasmanian Government Railways.

== History ==
In 1912, the Tasmanian Government Railways took delivery of two 2-6-2+2-6-2 Garratt locomotives from Beyer, Peacock & Company, Manchester. They were designed to haul freight trains. However, they did on occasions haul passenger trains. Both were withdrawn in 1930 after the Q class entered service. However, a motive power shortage during World War II saw both overhauled and returned to service in 1943. Both were withdrawn when replaced by Australian Standard Garratts in 1945.
