= South African Class GA 2-6-0+0-6-2 =

1921 articulated steam locomotive

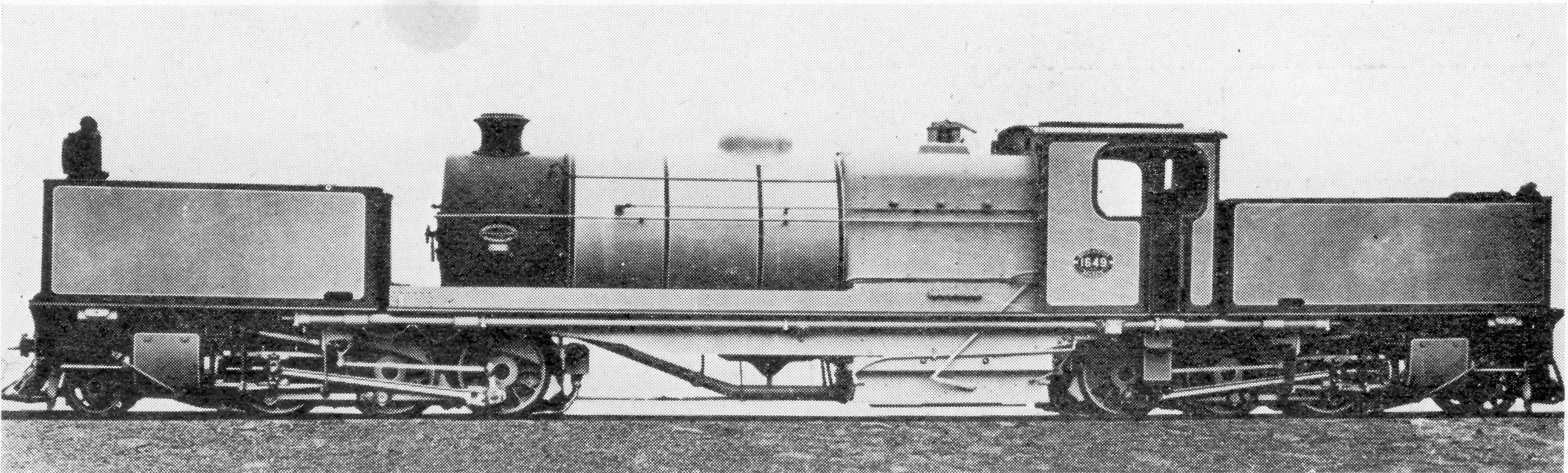
- Class GA no. 1649, renumbered to no. 2140, c. 1921
Type and origin
- Power type: Steam
- Designer: Beyer, Peacock & Company
- Builder: Beyer, Peacock & Company
- Serial number: 5941
- Model: Class GA
- Build date: 1920
- Total produced: 1
Specifications
- Configuration
  - Whyte: 2-6-0+0-6-2 (Double Mogul)
  - UIC: 1’C+C1’h4
- Driver: 3rd & 4th coupled axles
- Gauge: 3 ft 6 in (1,067 mm) Cape gauge
- Leading dia.: 30 in (762 mm)
- Coupled dia.: 48 in (1,219 mm)
- Wheelbase: 58 ft 7 in (17,856 mm)
  - Engine: 16 ft 2 in (4,928 mm) each
  - Coupled: 9 ft (2,743 mm) each
- Pivot centres: 33 ft 3 in (10,135 mm)
- Length
  - Over couplers: 65 ft 6 in (19,964 mm)
- Height: 12 ft 10 in (3,912 mm)
- Frame type: Plate
- Axle load: 17 LT 16 cwt (18,090 kg)
  - Leading: 14 LT 9 cwt (14,680 kg) front 14 LT 4 cwt (14,430 kg) rear
  - 1st coupled: 17 LT 3 cwt (17,430 kg)
  - 2nd coupled: 17 LT 14 cwt (17,980 kg)
  - 3rd coupled: 17 LT 7 cwt (17,630 kg)
  - 4th coupled: 17 LT 9 cwt (17,730 kg)
  - 5th coupled: 17 LT 16 cwt (18,090 kg)
  - 6th coupled: 17 LT 5 cwt (17,530 kg)
- Adhesive weight: 104 LT 14 cwt (106,400 kg)
- Loco weight: 133 LT 17 cwt (136,000 kg)
- Fuel type: Coal
- Fuel capacity: 9 LT (9.1 t)
- Water cap.: 3,350 imp gal (15,200 L) front 1,250 imp gal (5,680 L) rear
- Firebox
  - Type: Belpaire
  - Grate area: 51.8 sq ft (4.81 m^{2})
- Boiler
  - Pitch: 7 ft 9 in (2,362 mm)
  - Diameter: 6 ft 9 in (2,057 mm)
  - Tube plates: 11 ft 8 1/4 in (3,562 mm)
  - Small tubes: 279: 2 in (51 mm)
  - Large tubes: 40: 5 1/4 in (133 mm)
- Boiler pressure: 180 psi (1,241 kPa)
- Safety valve: Ramsbottom
- Heating surface
  - Firebox: 211.3 sq ft (19.63 m^{2})
  - Tubes: 2,342.2 sq ft (217.60 m^{2})
  - Total surface: 2,554.5 sq ft (237.32 m^{2})
- Superheater
  - Heating area: 526.5 sq ft (48.91 m^{2})
- Cylinders: Four
- Cylinder size: 18 in (457 mm) bore 26 in (660 mm) stroke
- Valve gear: Walschaerts
- Valve type: Piston
- Couplers: Johnston link-and-pin AAR knuckle (1930s)
Performance figures
- Tractive effort: 47,390 lbf (210.8 kN) @ 75%
Career
- Operators: South African Railways
- Class: Class GA
- Number in class: 1
- Numbers: 1649, renumbered 2140
- Delivered: 1921
- First run: 1921
- Withdrawn: 1938

The South African Railways Class GA 2-6-0+0-6-2 of 1921 was an articulated steam locomotive.

In February 1921, the South African Railways placed a single experimental Class GA Garratt articulated steam locomotive with a 2-6-0+0-6-2 Double Mogul type wheel arrangement in service. It was the first Cape gauge Garratt to enter service in South Africa.

== The Garratt solution ==
A powerful steam locomotive is problematic on Cape gauge light-rail single-line track. Train lengths were limited on such lines because, due to restrictions on axle loading, conventional locomotives had been enlarged to the limit of their possible power. Alternative solutions would either be double-heading longer trains or rebuilding and re-aligning large parts of the lines to accommodate heavier locomotives. Either method was expensive, especially across the type of mountainous terrain that was encountered inland from all South Africa's major ports. In such conditions, the Garratt design had distinct advantages.

== Manufacturer ==
The Class GA experimental mainline articulated locomotive was one of altogether five Garratt locomotives that had been ordered by the South African Railways (SAR) from Beyer, Peacock & Company in 1914. The rest consisted of the first of the eventual seven Class GB 2-6-2+2-6-2 branchline locomotives and three narrow gauge Class NG G11 2-6-0+0-6-2 locomotives. Production was disrupted by World War I, however, and Beyer, Peacock & Company was only able to deliver the narrow gauge locomotives in 1919 and the Cape gauge locomotives in 1921, after cessation of hostilities.

The single Class GA locomotive was numbered 1649, but the engine number was later changed to 2140. The locomotive was erected in the Durban shops and placed in service in February 1921. At the time, it was 40 long tons (40.6 tonnes) heavier than any Garratt engine constructed previously and, of all Garratts in service worldwide, the locomotive with the highest tractive effort.

== Characteristics ==
The superheated Class GA had a commodious cab and had plate frames, with a copper Belpaire firebox and combustion chamber. The piston valves were actuated by Walschaerts valve gear, driven from the coupled wheels furthest from the respective cylinders and controlled by steam reversing gear which was fitted under the boiler barrel between the cradle frame plates. The bissel trucks at the extremities of the locomotive were fitted with Cartazzi axle box control to allow the axles sideways play since the truck itself did not pivot, but was compensated with the adjacent pair of coupled wheels.

The locomotive had valves to allow the steam supply to either engine unit to be shut off, if necessary. Exhaust steam from the cylinders of each engine unit was led to the smokebox by separate pipes. The ball joints which gave flexibility to the steam and exhaust pipes were located immediately under and concentric with the pivot centres and were served by forced lubrication from Wakefield mechanical lubricators. Two 8 feet (2,438 millimetres) lubricators, one on each engine unit, supplied one feed to each cylinder and each steam chest, two to the ball joints and two to the tail-end extensions of the piston rods. The oil pipes which fed the steam chests and cylinders were fitted with anti-carbonisers. The locomotive was fitted with two Gresham and Craven no. 12 self-acting feedwater injectors and had steam sanding gear, applied to the front and rear of both engine units.

== Comparative trials ==
The Class GA, which had apparently been designed as a direct competitor to the Class MH 2-6-6-2 Mallet locomotive, was placed in trial service on the Natal mainline. It closely matched the Mallet in terms of tractive effort, boiler capacity, grate area and axle loading, which made it a locomotive of equal power but with 46 long tons (46.7 tonnes) less weight. Tests were carried out with varying loads on various sections of the line, while comparative tests were carried out with the Class MH Mallets.

During the trials, the locomotive gave some trouble due to broken plate frames on the engine units and it was also found that the absence of trailing carrying wheels on the engine units was a disadvantage since it led to excessive flange wear on the coupled wheels. As a result, no. 2140 remained the only representative of its Class. All subsequent Garratt models of the SAR were equipped with trailing Bissel trucks.

The Garratt took greater loads than the Mallet and its running times were better, while its coal and water consumption were lower. With the Garratt's superiority established, no further Mallet locomotives were ordered by the SAR. During the remaining years of the South African steam traction era, whenever the use of an articulated locomotive was desirable for flexibility, reduced axle loading and high tractive force, the Garratt type was chosen. Two derivative designs, the Modified Fairlie and Union Garratt, would be tried but would both prove to be less successful than the purebred Garratt.

== Service ==
The locomotive worked across Van Reenen's Pass between Ladysmith and Harrismith for most of the rest of its service life. It was withdrawn from service in 1938 because of a cracked frame and scrapped. The boiler was retained and reconditioned as a spare boiler for Class GE locomotives.
