= South African Class GB 2-6-2+2-6-2 =

1921 articulated steam locomotive

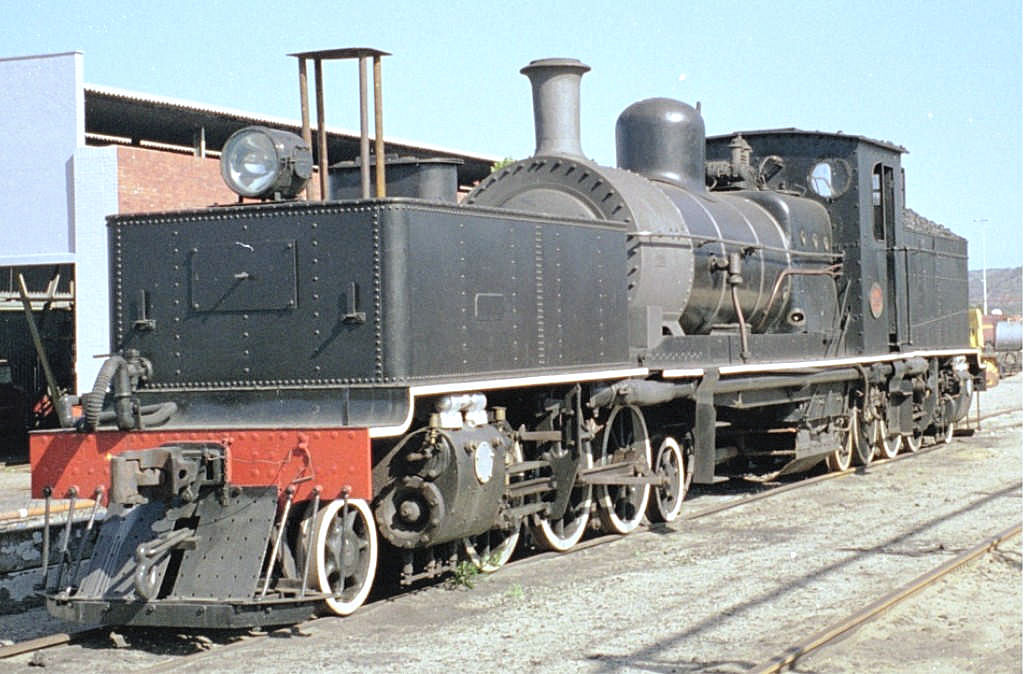
- Class GB no. 2166, Voorbaai, 4 September 1997
Type and origin
- ♠ Locomotive no. 2166 ♥ Locomotive numbers 2160-2165
- Power type: Steam
- Designer: Beyer, Peacock & Company
- Builder: Beyer, Peacock & Company
- Serial number: 5942, 6181-6186
- Model: Class GB
- Build date: 1921, 1924
- Total produced: 7
Specifications
- Configuration
  - Whyte: 2-6-2+2-6-2 (Double Prairie)
  - UIC: 1’C1'+1’C1’h4
- Driver: 3rd & 4th coupled axles
- Gauge: 3 ft 6 in (1,067 mm) Cape gauge
- Leading dia.: 28 1/2 in (724 mm)
- Coupled dia.: 42 3/4 in (1,086 mm)
- Trailing dia.: 28 1/2 in (724 mm)
- Wheelbase: 53 ft (16,154 mm)
  - Engine: ♠ 17 ft 5 in (5,309 mm) each ♥ 17 ft 5 1/4 in (5,315 mm) each
  - Coupled: 8 ft (2,438 mm) each
- Pivot centres: 26 ft 6 in (8,077 mm)
- Length
  - Over couplers: 59 ft 6 3/4 in (18,155 mm)
- Height: 12 ft 3 in (3,734 mm)
- Frame type: Plate
- Axle load: ♠ 7 LT 14 cwt (7,824 kg) ♥ 8 LT (8,128 kg)
  - Leading: ♠ 6 LT 19 cwt (7,062 kg) front 7 LT 1 cwt (7,163 kg) rear ♥ 7 LT 16 cwt (7,925 kg) front 7 LT 12 cwt (7,722 kg) rear
  - 1st coupled: ♠ 7 LT 10 cwt (7,620 kg) ♥ 7 LT 16 cwt (7,925 kg)
  - 2nd coupled: ♠ 7 LT 9 cwt (7,570 kg) ♥ 7 LT 16 cwt (7,925 kg)
  - 3rd coupled: ♠ 7 LT 9 cwt (7,570 kg) ♥ 7 LT 16 cwt (7,925 kg)
  - 4th coupled: ♠ 7 LT 13 cwt (7,773 kg) ♥ 8 LT (8,128 kg)
  - 5th coupled: ♠ 7 LT 14 cwt (7,824 kg) ♥ 8 LT (8,128 kg)
  - 6th coupled: ♠ 7 LT 14 cwt (7,824 kg) ♥ 8 LT (8,128 kg)
  - Trailing: ♠ 6 LT (6,096 kg) front 6 LT 4 cwt (6,299 kg) rear ♥ 6 LT 14 cwt (6,808 kg) front 7 LT 1 cwt (7,163 kg) rear
- Adhesive weight: ♠ 45 LT 9 cwt (46,180 kg) ♥ 47 LT 8 cwt (48,160 kg)
- Loco weight: ♠ 71 LT 13 cwt (72,800 kg) ♥ 76 LT 1 cwt (77,270 kg)
- Fuel type: Coal
- Fuel capacity: 5 LT (5.1 t)
- Water cap.: ♠ 1,450 imp gal (6,590 L) front 550 imp gal (2,500 L) rear ♥ 1,520 imp gal (6,910 L) front 800 imp gal (3,640 L) rear
- Firebox
  - Type: Belpaire
  - Grate area: ♠♥ 23 sq ft (2.1 m^{2})
- Boiler
  - Pitch: 7 ft (2,134 mm)
  - Diameter: 4 ft 5 7/8 in (1,368 mm)
  - Tube plates: ♠ 10 ft 4 in (3,150 mm) ♥ 10 ft 4 3/8 in (3,159 mm)
  - Small tubes: ♠ 128: 1 7/8 in (48 mm) ♥ 119: 1 7/8 in (48 mm)
  - Large tubes: ♠ 21: 5 1/4 in (133 mm) ♥ 21: 5 1/2 in (140 mm)
- Boiler pressure: 180 psi (1,241 kPa)
- Safety valve: Ramsbottom
- Heating surface
  - Firebox: ♠ 105 sq ft (9.8 m^{2}) ♥ 104 sq ft (9.7 m^{2})
  - Tubes: ♠ 944 sq ft (87.7 m^{2}) ♥ 914 sq ft (84.9 m^{2})
  - Total surface: ♠ 1,049 sq ft (97.5 m^{2}) ♥ 1,018 sq ft (94.6 m^{2})
- Superheater
  - Heating area: ♠ 174 sq ft (16.2 m^{2}) ♥ 203 sq ft (18.9 m^{2})
- Cylinders: Four
- Cylinder size: 12 in (305 mm) bore 20 in (508 mm) stroke
- Valve gear: Walschaerts
- Valve type: Piston
- Couplers: Johnston link-and-pin AAR knuckle (1930s)
Performance figures
- Tractive effort: 18,190 lbf (80.9 kN) @ 75%
Career
- Operators: South African Railways
- Class: Class GB
- Number in class: 7
- Numbers: 1650 renumbered 2166, 2160-2165
- Delivered: 1921, 1924
- First run: 1921
- Withdrawn: 1967

The South African Railways Class GB 2-6-2+2-6-2 of 1921 was an articulated steam locomotive.

In June 1921, the South African Railways placed a single experimental Class GB Garratt articulated steam locomotive with a 2-6-2+2-6-2 Double Prairie type wheel arrangement in service. Six more of these locomotives entered service in 1924.

== Manufacturer ==
The first experimental model of eventually seven Class GB branch line Garratt articulated locomotives was one of altogether five Garratts which were ordered by the South African Railways (SAR) from Beyer, Peacock & Company in 1914. The rest of the order consisted of three narrow gauge Class NG G11 2-6-0+0-6-2 locomotives and a single experimental Class GA 2-6-0+0-6-2 mainline locomotive. Production was disrupted by World War I, however, and Beyer, Peacock & Company was only able to deliver the narrow gauge locomotives in 1919 and the two Cape gauge locomotives in 1921, after cessation of hostilities.

== Characteristics ==
The Class GB was numbered 1650, but the engine number was later changed to 2166. The locomotive was erected in the Durban shops and placed in service in June 1921. It was superheated, with a Belpaire firebox, plate frames and Walschaerts valve gear. The boiler was provided with the Gresley type air valve and mechanical lubrication was provided for the coupled wheel axle boxes.

In 1924, six more locomotives of this Class were placed in service, also built by BP and numbered in the range from 2160 to 2165. They embodied all the improvements which experience with the first engine had shown desirable. The main differences between these locomotives and the original were revised boiler proportions and a larger water bunker capacity. The most obvious difference was a more completely enclosed cab with side windows instead of the curved cut-outs in the cab sides of the first locomotive. They were also heavier, 76 long tons 1 hundredweight (77,270 kilograms) compared to the 71 long tons 13 hundredweight (72,800 kilograms) of the engine of 1921.

== Service ==
The first locomotive was placed in service working passenger trains on the Natal South Coast line. It proved to be a successful locomotive, having good riding qualities and flexibility on light track with poor ballasting and many curves of 300 feet (91 metres) radius.

A couple of the second batch of locomotives joined the first one on the South Coast line for a brief period, but most went directly to the Eastern Cape where they were used on the Port Alfred branch and the Aliwal North to Barkly East line, famous for its reverses and its 1 in 30 (3⅓%) compensated ruling gradients. The Natal locomotives were soon also relocated to work there when the Class GC Garratts replaced them on the South Coast line later in 1924. They remained working on the Barkly East branch until they were withdrawn from service in 1967.
