= New Cape Central Railway =

Defunct railway company in South Africa

The Cape Central Railway, later known as the New Cape Central Railway, was a railway in the Cape Colony, now part of South Africa. It linked the Cape Government Railways at Worcester, first to Ashton, then extended to Swellendam and eventually to Mossel Bay. This privately owned line of 205 miles was bought by South African Railways in 1925.

The New Cape Central Railway shown within the network of the Cape Government Railways in 1910

== History ==
Construction of the first part of the line of the Cape Central Railway from Worcester was paid for by a combination of share capital and a subsidy from the Colonial Government of £50,000. It opened to Robertson in January 1887 and to Ashton in October of the same year. It very quickly ran into financial difficulties and went bankrupt around 1889. The liqidator was Sir Thomas Charles Scanlen and in August 1892 was sold to the New Cape Central Railway which was registered in England in 1893. By 1896 the railway had gross earnings of £15,815 and net earnings of £6,294.

A 40-mile extension of the line to Swellendham was funded by mortgage debentures, share capital and a further subsidy by the Colonial Government at £1,500 per mile. It opened on 12 April 1899. The Railway Magazine of 1901 reported that the line was complete to Riversdale, but not yet working, and noted that construction was rapid compared to State-managed railways. In 1902, Parliament agreed to subsidize the final 57 mile section to Mossel Bay at the rate of £2,000 per mile. It opened on 22 Jan 1906.

The company was purchased by South African Railways for £1,100,000 on 1 August 1925.

In 2023 a tourist steam train began operating out of Robertson station under the name New Cape Central Railway.
