= NZASM 18 Tonner 0-6-0ST =

Type of steam locomotive

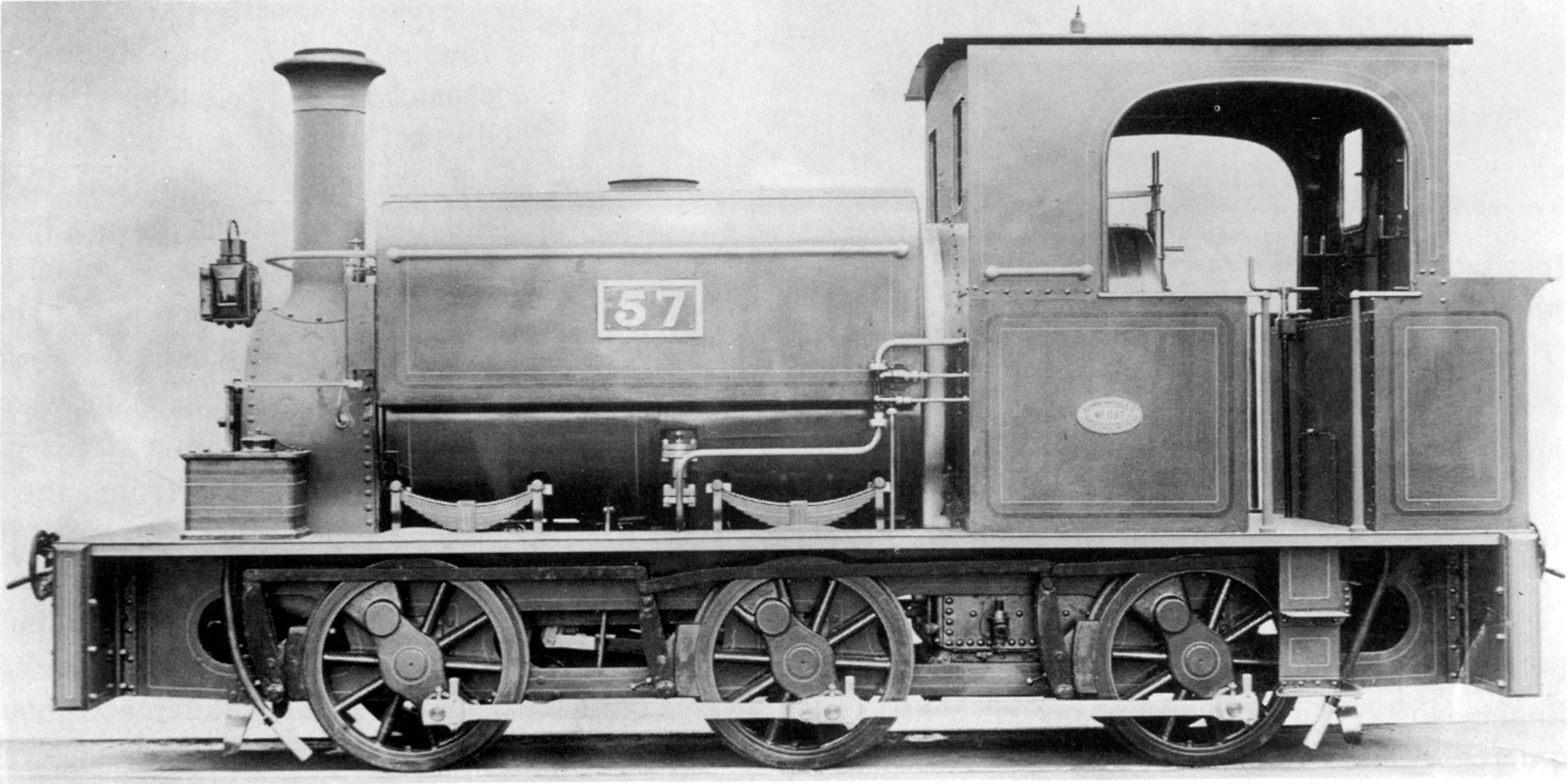
- NZASM no. 13, Delagoa Bay Railway no. 57
Type and origin
- Power type: Steam
- Designer: Manning Wardle
- Builder: Manning Wardle
- Serial number: 1177-1179, 1186-1188
- Build date: 1890
- Total produced: 6
Specifications
- Configuration
  - Whyte: 0-6-0ST
  - UIC: Cn2t
- Driver: 2nd coupled axle
- Gauge: 3 ft 6 in (1,067 mm) Cape gauge
- Coupled dia.: 36 in (914 mm)
- Wheelbase: 10 ft 10 in (3,302 mm)
  - Axle spacing (Asymmetrical): 1-2: 5 ft 3 in (1,600 mm); 2-3: 5 ft 7 in (1,702 mm)
  - Coupled: 10 ft 10 in (3,302 mm)
- Length
  - Over couplers: 21 ft 10 in (6,655 mm)
- Width: 6 ft 8 in (2,032 mm)
- Height: 10 ft 4 1/2 in (3,162 mm)
- Frame type: Plate
- Axle load: 5 LT 18 cwt (5,995 kg)
  - Coupled: 5 LT 18 cwt (5,995 kg)
- Loco weight: 17 LT 14 cwt (17,980 kg)
- Fuel type: Coal
- Fuel capacity: 15 long hundredweight (0.8 t)
- Water cap.: 460 imp gal (2,090 L)
- Firebox
  - Type: Round-top
  - Grate area: 6 sq ft (0.56 m^{2})
- Boiler
  - Pitch: 4 ft 9 1/2 in (1,460 mm)
  - Diameter: 2 ft 9 in (838 mm) outside
  - Tube plates: 8 ft (2,438 mm)
  - Small tubes: 97: 1 7/8 in (48 mm)
- Boiler pressure: 140 psi (965 kPa)
- Heating surface
  - Firebox: 43 sq ft (4.0 m^{2})
  - Tubes: 381 sq ft (35.4 m^{2})
  - Total surface: 424 sq ft (39.4 m^{2})
- Cylinders: Two
- Cylinder size: 12 in (305 mm) bore 17 in (432 mm) stroke
- Valve gear: Stephenson
- Valve type: Slide
- Couplers: Johnston link-and-pin
Performance figures
- Tractive effort: 7,140 lbf (31.8 kN) @ 75%
Career
- Operators: Delagoa Bay Railway; NZASM; Imperial Military Railways; Central South African Railways
- Class: NZASM 18 Tonner
- Number in class: 6
- Numbers: Delagoa 53-58; NZASM 9-14; IMR 606-611
- Official name: 18 Tonner
- Delivered: 1890
- First run: 1890

The NZASM 18 Tonner 0-6-0ST of 1890 was a South African steam locomotive from the pre-Union era in Transvaal.

In 1890, the Nederlandsche-Zuid-Afrikaansche Spoorweg-Maatschappij of the Zuid-Afrikaansche Republiek (Transvaal Republic) placed six 0-6-0ST locomotives in service on construction work. Since the railway classified its locomotives according to their weight, these engines were known as 18 Tonners.

== The Delagoa Bay line ==
To have an outlet to a harbour, a railway from Delagoa Bay in the Portuguese colony of Mozambique to Pretoria had been proposed to the Volksraad of the Zuid-Afrikaansche Republiek (ZAR) by President F.T. Burgers as far back as 1872. At that time, the Cape Government Railways had not yet begun with its inland expansion from Wellington and the Natal Government Railways had not yet been established.

The Portuguese supported the idea, since it would open a trade route from Mozambique into the interior. In 1883, Major Joachim Machado was sent to Transvaal to report on a proposed route through the Komati river and Crocodile river valleys towards the Highveld and Pretoria. The resulting agreement was for the Portuguese to construct the section from Delagoa Bay (now Maputo) to the border at Komatipoort, while the ZAR would be responsible for the continuation of the railway to Pretoria.

The Nederlandsche-Zuid-Afrikaansche Spoorweg-Maatschappij (NZASM) was established on 21 June 1887 and proposed to construct two railway lines simultaneously. One was a 16-mile-long (26-kilometre) railway from Johannesburg to Boksburg, which became known as the Randtram line. The other was the first section of the Delagoa Bay railway from the Mozambique border, via Nelspruit to Pretoria.

The Randtram line was officially opened on 17 March 1890. The Portuguese line from Delagoa Bay had already reached the Transvaal border on 14 December 1887, but the first train from Delagoa Bay only entered Komatipoort on 1 July 1891 when the NZASM's contractors completed the bridge across the Komati river. The section from Komatipoort to Nelspruit was completed by 20 June 1892. Waterval Boven was reached on 20 June 1894 and Balmoral, near Witbank, on 20 October 1894. Here, connection was made with the section which had simultaneously been built eastwards from Pretoria.

== Manufacturer ==
Six 0-6-0ST locomotives, built by Manning Wardle and Company, were placed in service by the NZASM in 1890 and were used mainly on construction work. Since the NZASM classified its locomotives according to their weight, they were known as 18 Tonners.

As was often the practice at the time, the locomotives were purchased from the manufacturer and imported by agents acting on behalf of the end customer, the agent in the case of the 18 Tonners being Mynssen and Company. They were built in two batches of three and shipped from the factory between March and June 1890.

== Characteristics ==
The locomotives had inside cylinders, arranged at an incline, with slide valves which were actuated by Stephenson valve gear through rocker shafts. The cylinders and valve gear were placed between the plate frames and hidden from view by the wheels, which were coupled with external connecting rods. Together with the Cape Town Railway & Dock's Blackie of 1859, these were the only two-cylinder locomotives with an inside cylinder and valve gear arrangement to see service in South Africa.

There were minor differences between the locomotives of the two batches, the most notable being different footplate contours and buffer beams on the second batch. All six were equipped with 460 imperial gallons (2,090 litres) capacity water tanks.

== Numbering conundrum ==
The engine numbers on record for the 18 Tonners are a source of some confusion. They were rostered on the NZASM in the number range from 9 to 14, following on from the NZASM 10 Tonner engine numbers. The Manning Wardle works records, however, listed them as being numbered in the Delagoa Bay Railway number range from 53 to 58, following on from the engine numbers of the 10 Tonners which also served on the Delagoa Bay Railway. Furthermore, a Manning Wardle builder's picture of an 18 Tonner shows it with the Delagoa Bay Railway engine number 57.

Similarly, in the works list of the Dutch manufacturer Machinefabriek Breda in respect of the 10 Tonners, those locomotives are also recorded with Delagoa Bay Railway engine numbers 50 to 52 instead of NZASM engine numbers 6 to 8.

It appears, therefore, that the 10 Tonners and 18 Tonners entered service on, or were at least delivered to, the Delagoa Bay Railway and were only rostered on the NZASM at a later stage.

The 10 Tonners and 18 Tonners were all delivered in 1890. At the time the first ones entered service in March and April 1890, the Randtram line, where the 10 Tonners were to be placed in service, had just been opened, with the first train being hauled by a 14 Tonner locomotive. However, the construction of the extensions of the Randtram line were still in progress towards the east to Springs and towards the west via Roodepoort to Krugersdorp. The extension from Germiston to Pretoria was only completed in December 1892, when a start was also made on the line from Pretoria to meet the approaching Delagoa Bay line, but Eerste Fabrieken in Pretoria East was only reached on 13 May 1894.

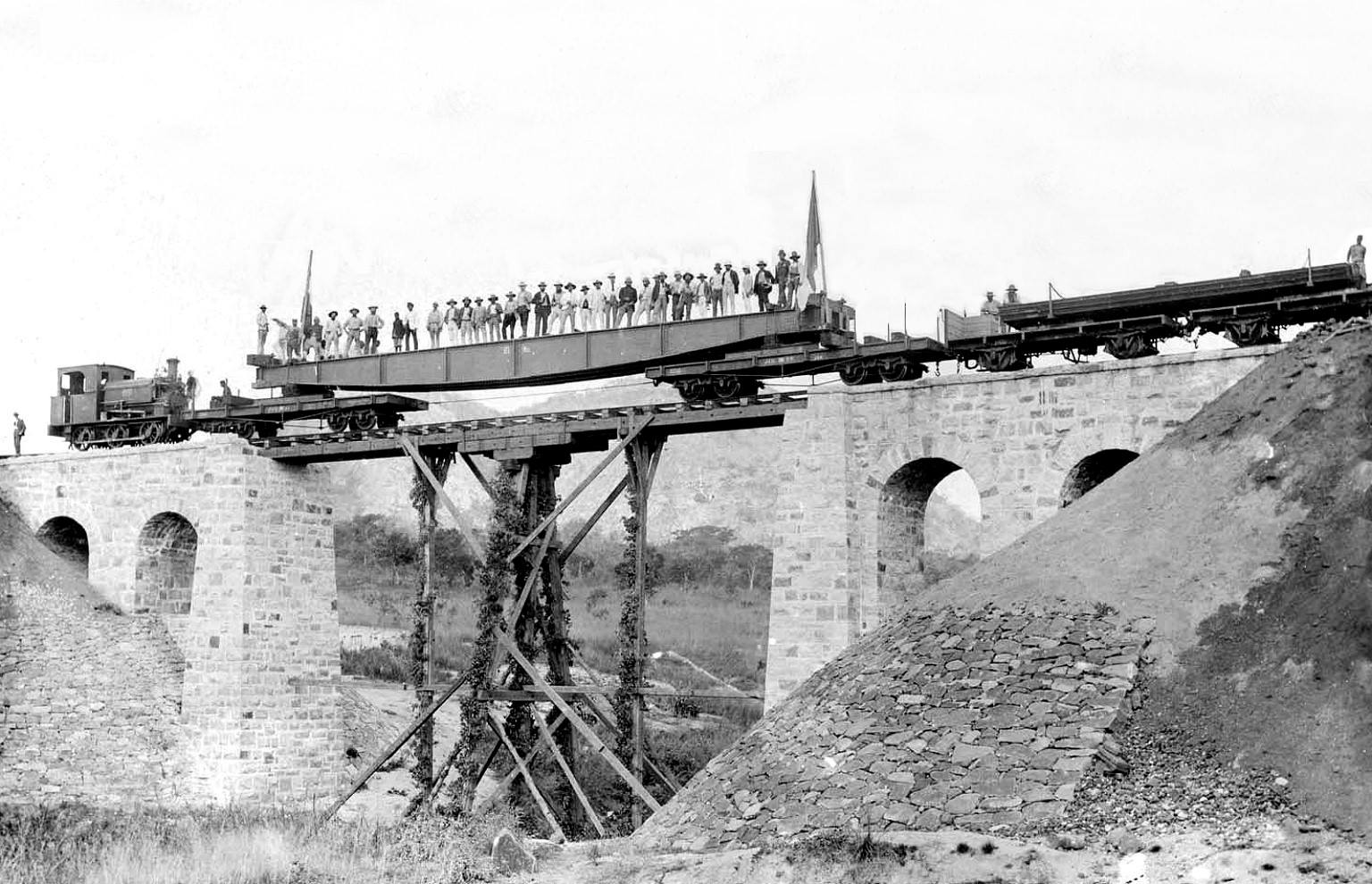
18 Tonner at work during the construction of the Brinkspruit bridge

From the Mozambique end, the bridge across the Komati river was only completed in July 1891, Nelspruit was only reached in June 1892, Waterval Boven two years later in June 1894 and the link-up with Pretoria was only completed at Balmoral in October 1894, more than four years after the 18 Tonners entered service.

Since they were used on construction work, it can therefore be considered most likely that the 18 Tonners were first placed in service on the Delagoa Bay Railway, hence the Delagoa Bay Railway engine numbers, from where they progressed towards Pretoria as the railway was being built.

Whether this could have been the case with all six 18 Tonners as well as the 10 Tonners, or whether at least some of the 18 Tonners were used on construction work from the Pretoria end as well, is not known. The section from the Delagoa Bay end was completed all the way up to Waterval Boven on the Highveld at about the same time that the section from the Pretoria end reached Eerste Fabrieken in Pretoria East.

== Service ==
=== Imperial Military Railways ===
All railway operations in the two Boer Republics, the ZAR and the Orange Free State, were taken over by the Imperial Military Railways (IMR) during the Second Boer War. The IMR renumbering register made provision for all six 18 Tonners, in the number range from 606 to 611. Three of them were later converted to stationary boilers no. 1592, 1593 and 1704.

=== Central South African Railways ===
At the end of the war, when the IMR was transformed into the Central South African Railways (CSAR), either one or two of the 18 Tonners survived and were renumbered, either as CSAR no. E or as numbers D and E. The uncertainty arises from the fact that the renumbering register lists CSAR no. D both as 14 Tonner no. 5 and as one of the 18 Tonner locomotives.

=== Industrial service ===
Two of the 18 Tonners were sold to industry, but neither was identified by engine number. One went to the Rand Collieries Schapenrust Coal Mines and was later sold again to Apex Colliery, where it was their no. 1. Another one went to Brakpan Mines, where it was their no. 2.

By the time the South African Railways classification and renumbering program was implemented in 1912, none of them were in railway service any longer.

== Works numbers ==
The NZASM 18 Tonner works numbers, factory shipping dates and Delagoa Bay Railway, NZASM and IMR engine numbers are listed in the table.

NZASM 18 Tonner 0-6-0T
Works no.	Date shipped	Delagoa no.	NZASM no.	IMR no.
1177	1 Mar 1890	53	9	606
1178	26 Mar 1890	54	10	607
1179	29 Mar 1890	55	11	608
1186	16 May 1890	56	12	609
1187	5 Jun 1890	57	13	610
1188	5 Jun 1890	58	14	611
