= NZASM 10 Tonner 0-4-0T =

Type of steam locomotive

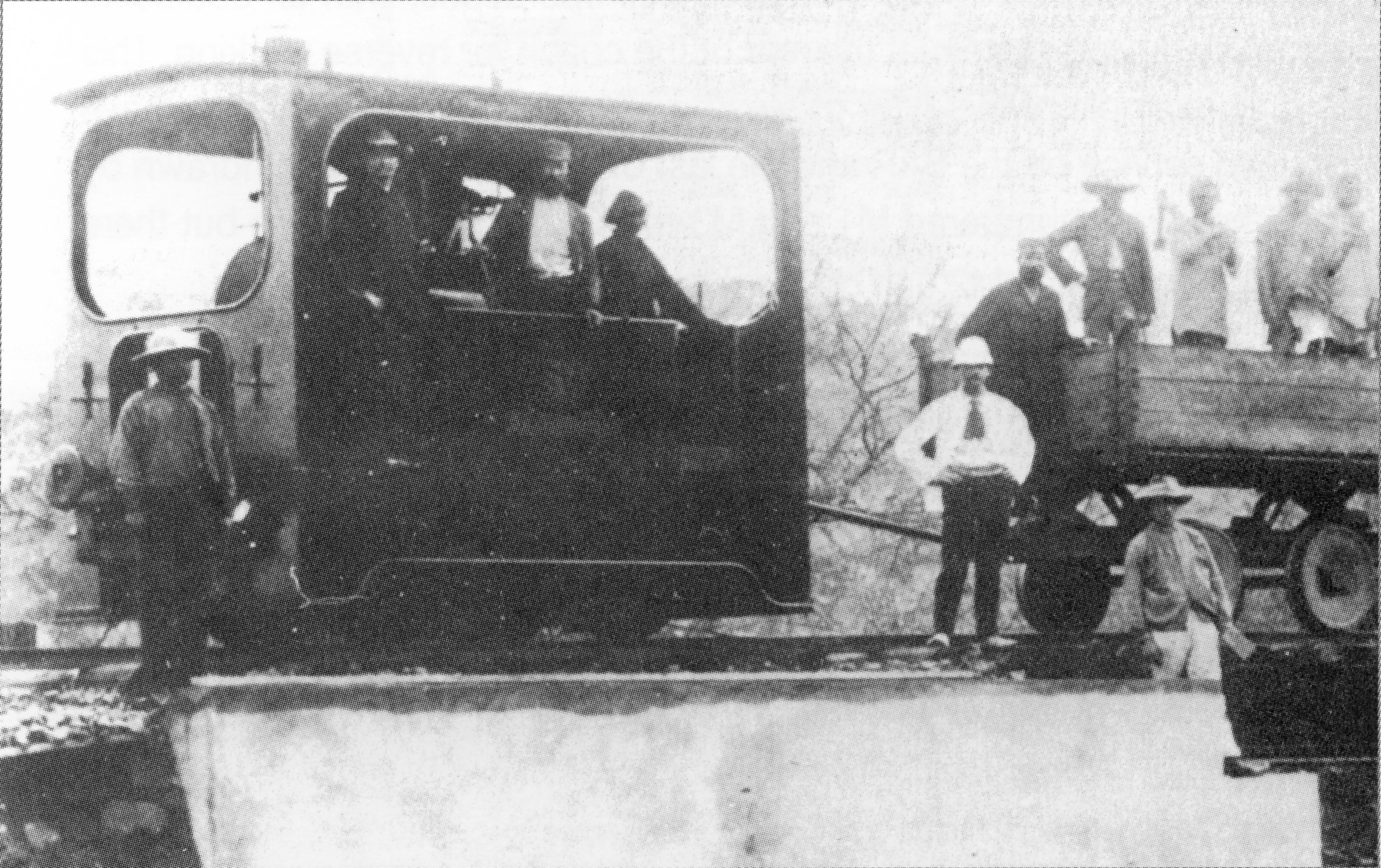
- NZASM 10 Tonner tram locomotive, c. 1890
Type and origin
- Power type: Steam
- Designer: Machinefabriek Breda v/h Backer & Rueb
- Builder: Louis Smulders & Co., Utrecht
- Serial number: 68, 69, 72
- Build date: 1889-1890
- Total produced: 3
Specifications
- Configuration
  - Whyte: 0-4-0T
  - UIC: Bn2t
- Driver: 2nd coupled axle
- Gauge: 3 ft 6 in (1,067 mm) Cape gauge
- Coupled dia.: 29 3/4 in (756 mm)
- Wheelbase: 4 ft 11 1/16 in (1,500 mm)
- Length
  - Over couplers: 15 ft (4,572 mm)
- Height: 10 ft 6 in (3,200 mm)
- Frame type: Plate
- Axle load: 5 LT 2 cwt 1 qtr (5,195 kg)
  - 1st coupled: 5 LT 2 cwt 1 qtr (5,195 kg)
  - 2nd coupled: 5 LT 2 cwt 1 qtr (5,195 kg)
- Loco weight: 10 LT 4 cwt 2 qtr (10,390 kg)
- Fuel type: Coal
- Firebox
  - Type: Round-top
  - Grate area: 2.53 sq ft (0.235 m^{2})
- Boiler
  - Pitch: 5 ft 6 1/2 in (1,689 mm)
  - Diameter: 2 ft 10 23/32 in (882 mm)
  - Tube plates: 4 ft 3 3/16 in (1,300 mm)
  - Small tubes: 73 tubes
- Cylinders: Two
- Cylinder size: 7 2/25 in (180 mm) bore 11 4/5 in (300 mm) stroke
- Valve gear: Joy
- Valve type: Slide
- Couplers: Johnston link-and-pin
Career
- Operators: Delagoa Bay Railway; NZASM
- Class: NZASM 10 Tonner
- Number in class: 3
- Numbers: Delagoa 50-52; NZASM 6-8
- Official name: 10 Tonner
- Delivered: 1889-1890
- First run: 1890

The NZASM 10 Tonner 0-4-0T of 1889 was a South African steam locomotive from the pre-Union era in Transvaal.

In 1889 and 1890, the Nederlandsche-Zuid-Afrikaansche Spoorweg-Maatschappij obtained three 0-4-0T tramway steam locomotives for use on the new line from Johannesburg to Boksburg which became known as the Randtram line. Since the railway classified its locomotives according to their weight, these tank locomotives were known as the 10 Tonners.

== The Randtram line ==
As a result of the rapid development of the goldfields on the Witwatersrand in the 1880s and the demand for coal by the growing industry, a concession was granted by the Zuid-Afrikaansche Republiek (ZAR) government to the Nederlandsche-Zuid-Afrikaansche Spoorweg-Maatschappij (Netherlands-South African Railway Company, NZASM) on 20 July 1888 to construct a 16-mile-long (26-kilometre) railway from Johannesburg to Boksburg. The railway, which was opened on 17 March 1890 with the first train being hauled by a 14 Tonner locomotive, became known as the Randtram, even though it was actually a railway in every aspect and not singularly dedicated to tram traffic. This was the first working railway line in Transvaal.

The concession was extended the following year to continue the line eastwards to Springs, where coal was known to exist, and westwards via Roodepoort to Krugersdorp. The entire 49-mile-long (79-kilometre) railway was opened to traffic on 10 February 1891.

== Manufacturer ==
In 1889 and 1890, motive power for the tramway service on the Randtram line was obtained from the Machinefabriek Breda voorheen Backer & Rueb (Breda machine factory, formerly Backer & Rueb). It consisted of three 0-4-0T tramway steam locomotives, which were built by Louis Smulders & Co. in Utrecht in the Netherlands. Since the NZASM classified its locomotives according to their weight, these tramway locomotives were known as 10 Tonners.

== Characteristics ==
The locomotive was a smaller and less ornate version of the range of rectangular steam tram locomotives which were produced by Machinefabriek Breda from the later 1800s into the first decades of the 20th century. They were nicknamed Backertjes in the Netherlands.

The compact little locomotive was completely enclosed and the chimney extended through the roof. The inclined cylinders were arranged between the plate frames, while the slide valves above the cylinders were arranged horizontally and actuated by Joy valve gear. The regulator handle was fitted to the side of the steam dome and controlled from that position, while the firebox door was also arranged on the side of the firebox.

== Numbering conundrum ==
Instead of the NZASM 10 Tonner engine numbers in the range from 6 to 8, the Machinefabriek Breda works list recorded them as Delagoa Bay Railway numbers 50 to 52. While one source described these locomotives as having begun their service life on the Randtram line and having later been transferred to the Delagoa Bay Railway in Mozambique, the manufacturer's works list suggests that it was probably the other way around.

This seems to be borne out by another source, according to which the engines only entered service on the Randtram line in 1891.

A similar anomaly exists in respect of the six NZASM 18 Tonner locomotives which were acquired from Manning Wardle and Company in 1890. They were rostered on the NZASM in the number range from 9 to 14, following on from the 10 Tonner engine numbers. However, the Manning Wardle works records list the 18 Tonners as being numbered in the Delagoa Bay Railway number range from 53 to 58, following on from the Delagoa engine numbers for the 10 Tonners. Furthermore, a Manning Wardle builder's picture of an 18 Tonner shows it bearing the Delagoa Bay Railway engine number 57.

At the time the first 10 Tonners and 18 Tonners entered service in March and April 1890, the Randtram line where the 10 Tonners were to be placed in service, had just been opened, with the first train being hauled by a 14 Tonner locomotive. The extensions of the Randtram line towards the east to Springs and towards the west via Roodepoort to Krugersdorp were still in progress.

It appears, therefore, that the 10 Tonners and 18 Tonners initially entered service on, or were at least delivered to, the Delagoa Bay Railway and were only rostered on the NZASM at a later stage.

== Service ==
All railway operations in the two Boer Republics, the ZAR and the Orange Free State, were taken over by the Imperial Military Railways (IMR) during the Second Boer War. The 10 Tonners do not appear in the renumbering lists of the IMR or its successor, the Central South African Railways (CSAR).

== Works numbers ==
The NZASM 10 Tonner works numbers and renumbering are shown in the table.

NZASM 10 Tonner 0-4-0T
Works no.	Delagoa no.	NZASM no.
68	50	6
69	51	7
72	52	8
