= Outeniqua Transport Museum =

Coordinates: 33.9632°S 22.4744°E

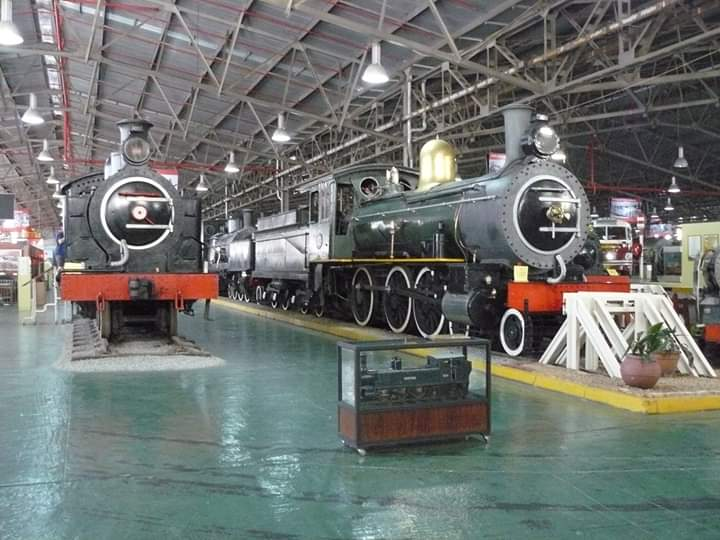
Inside the Transnet Transport Museum

The Transnet Transport Museum (previously known as the Outeniqua Transport Museum) is a railway museum located in George, South Africa.

The Transnet Transport Museum is one of the Transnet Heritage Assets and Preservation Portfolio's Transport Museums (the second is located in Kimberley). Situated in the former PX-goods shed in George, the museum opened on 24 September 1998.

The museum collection consists of a 21 steam locomotives and 22 coaches among other vehicles.

== Model trains ==
=== Captain John Baxter ===
Captain John Baxter was born in Natal, son of a Natal Government Railways/South African Railways station master whose last station was Sarnia on the old main line. From school, Baxter went to the General Botha naval training ship in Simonstown and served in the South African Navy in World War II. After the war, he joined Clan Line and was master of one of its ships when he took early retirement in 1967 and returned to South Africa with his English wife, June, and children Nigel and Debbie.

Baxter had a substantial British-prototype layout in his loft at Poole, but never lost his love of SAR trains. During the late fifties, he began modelling SAR prototypes to S-scale on 16.5mm gauge, which gave the precise scale-to-gauge ratio. His first SAR model was a long-tender 19D, followed by a 6th class. Then came a complete train of balcony stock with dining car and baggage van and a goods train with old-style wooden guards van with two separate passenger compartments at the rear. While John's modelling technique was as close to perfection as anyone could want, his signwriting left much to be desired. So when the guards van needed lettering he commissioned a competent member of the Poole Model Railway club to do the job. All Hugh (I've forgotten his surname) had to go on was a side-on photo of the Afrikaans side, so, not being proficient in Afrikaans, "Blankes" and "Nie blankes" became "Smoking" and "Non smoking" rather than the correct "Whites" and "Non-whites".

Having returned to South Africa, Baxter was soon signed up by SAR & H who appointed him master of a dredger in Durban Harbour. This left him time to continue modelling and over the years a selection of locomotives and rolling stock was built up which ran on a layout in his garage in Westville. There was a 16E, 8th class, 23 class, class 1, class 14R, class 6J, class H2, class A, class GO, class 12AR, class 6D. Many more coaches and freight wagons were added. All of which were replicas and built to run.

== Meta Collection ==
The models were required for the Van Riebeeck Tercentenary Exhibition which was held in Cape Town from the beginning of March of the following year, and which transport as used in the Cape, Natal, Transvaal and later Union of South Africa over a period of 300 years was embraced. These models included replicas of the famous Blue Train and Orange Express, a Natal mail train, and a typical coal train.

On the old 4 ft 8.5in gauge there were representative models of the first Cape Railway train, and of the original Natal Railways locomotive named "Natal" with wagon and carriage. There were also eleven complete trains representing the early days of the Cape and Natal Railways. Each train, passenger and goods train had its appropriate locomotive. The Transvaal and Orange Free State were represented by an original locomotive and twin coach, and six complete trains and representative and appropriate locomotives.

Of the modern South African Railways models there was a comprehensive range of locomotives and rolling stock.

== Road transport ==
=== Canadian Brill Bus ===
During 1947, the South African Railways Administration placed an order with the Canadian Car & Foundry (CCF) for 113 model IC-37/41 intercity coaches, costing £7000 each. Intercity coaches were specially designed for long distance journeys, providing maximum travel comfort combined with outstanding mechanical reliability. The JG Brill Company. had been building buses, trolleybuses and railroad cars in the USA for eighty years. In 1944 it had merged with the American Car & Foundry Company (ACF) to become ACF-Brill, and the new company licensed CCF in Montreal to build its bus designs for export to the mainly-righthand-drive British Commonwealth countries.

=== Thornycroft ===
Thornycroft was a United Kingdom -based vehicle manufacturer which built coaches, buses and trucks from 1896 until 1977.

Thornycroft started out with steam vans and lorries. Naval engineer John Isaac Thornycroft built his first steam lorry in 1896. Thornycroft's first petrol vehicle was built in 1902 and the company completed the switch to internal combustion engines in 1907.

This vehicle is one of the few remaining four wheel Thornycrofts still in existence.

== Rolling stock ==
=== Private Coach No 5 ===
Type = Private
Name = Tafelberg
Total built = 1
Built by = Imported
Number = 5
Date in service = 1903
Tare = 75,500lbs
DRG No = 1682(Date 1941)

Place for 6 people and 1 Attendant

Used by the System Manager Cape Town

South Africa-renamed in 1973 to Tafelberg. Also carried the name Sandveld

=== Private Coach 14 ===
Type = Private
Name = Constantia
Total built = 1
Built by =Metropolitan Carriage & Wagon Company, England
Number = 14 (CGR NO - 521)
Date in service = 1896
Tare = 63,200lbs

This coach was also used by the Minister of Railways. An allocation list of July 1928 shows this allocated for use by Minister and General. In the 1970s and 1980s it was used on the Free State Region by the Operating Department

=== Private Coach 18 ===
Type = Private
Name = Middleburg
Total built = 1
Built by = JJ Beijnes, Haarlem, Holland
Number = 18
Date in service = 1897

The original saloon of the late C.A.A Middelberg, Director (1890-1899) of the Nederlandsche Zuid Afrikaansche Spoorweg Maatskappij.

=== White Coach 49 ===
Type = Private
Name =
Total built = 1
Built by = Metropolitan Carriage & Wagon Company, England
Number = 49 (Old no126)
Date in service = 1947

It was specifically ordered for use on the Governor-General's White Train and was built by the Metropolitan Carriage & Wagon Company, England. It was placed in service as Car No.126 in June 1947.

This coach was neither intended nor ordered for the 1947 Royal train. It is often incorrectly linked to the 1947 Royal Train in the historical sense, but this is probably due to the fact that the car was intended for the White Train but only after the Royal Tour had been completed. This car being intended for specialised use on the White Train is undoubtedly one of the most luxurious diners in service on the South African Railways (SAR), but it was not used for general passenger service

The car's saloon contains one large longitudinal table which can accommodate sixteen persons. The kitchen is fitted out in stainless steel and the whole vehicle is air-conditioned. The wall paneling is satin-finished figured timber. A small bar is provided at the end opposite to the kitchen. The exterior profile is identical to the present Drakensberg stock.

The coach which was renumbered 49 in 1969, served on the White Train from June 1947 to 1975, when the State President's special train was officially withdrawn from service at the personal request of president Nico Diederichs.

This coach is notable as it was the central conference coach of the train which was placed in the centre of the Victoria Falls Bridge in August 1975 in one of the early abortive attempts to bring about peace in Rhodesia.

Coaches used for on State President's Train	Type before used on State President's Train	Old number before renumbering	Coaches used on 1947 Royal Train	State President's Coaches Numbers when train was withdrawn 1975	Disposal
Motor Car Wagon					
Motor Car Wagon					
Non-White staff & Equipment	K-45	4343		46	
White accommodations	C-34	8445		47	
White accommodations	C-34	8453		48	
Dining Car	White Train	126		49	Owned by Transnet Heritage Foundation (Outeniqua Transport Museum)
Personnel staff car	Governor-General's White Train	38	R6	50	
State President's coach	Governor-General's White Train	39	R7	51	Owned by Transnet Heritage Foundation (Outeniqua Transport Museum)
State President's Wife coach	Governor-General's White Train	40	R8	52	Owned by Greg Mclennan (Germiston Locomotive Depot)
Baggage Vane	K-45	4338		53	

=== White Coach 51 ===
Coach R7 (Princesses and Ladies-in-waiting)

The Royal Tour 1947

For this momentous occasion, eight new air-conditioned coaches were ordered from (Metro-Cammell Carriage & Wagon Company) In England. J. Stone & Co. Ltd. Provided the 'Stone-Carrier' air-conditioned equipment for the coaches. Under normal conditions, delivery of such luxury vehicles would be given two and a half years to complete, but in this instance, the contractors were given nine months to do so. Two Senior SAR Draughtsmen and a Senior Electrical Engineer were sent to England to Supervise the construction of the coaches

Five of the eight coaches ordered, were specialised luxury saloons while the remaining three, were built to standard (C-31-A/B Blue Train) design. The luxury saloons included the accommodation for the Royal Family and other dignitaries.

Use after Royal Tour

Saloon R7 for the Princesses and ladies-in-waiting, was also made available for the (White Train) as coach no.39) renumbered No.51 in May 1969 and used as the (Governor-General/State President saloon). When the 'White Train' was withdrawn from service in August 1975, this saloon was handed over to the S.A. Railway Museum for the National Collection.

=== 134 Kafue ===
Type = A-12 (ex CGR type R4)

Built in = Salt River

Total built = 6

Numbers = 129 to 134

Date in service = 1906-1964

These cars were destined to serve the South African Railways for a considerable period of time. As inherited from the (Cape Government Railways), they were not fitted with a bar - instead they featured a wine cellar. In 1922, approval was obtained to convert the cellar into a bar to bring these cars more into line with standard practice.

The last of the A-12s, No. 134 became departmental coach No. 14002 in January 1964. Four years earlier in 1960, consideration had actually been given to converting No. 134 for specialised use on non-white trains. The proposed alternative layout can be scrutinized on the appended diagrams. However, due to the vehicle's age it was decided not to proceed with the alterations. Thus the family of A-12's also dropped into pages of history.

=== 168 Palala ===
Type = A-18 series 2
Total built = 27
Built in = Pretoria Shops
Numbers = 165 to 194 (207)
Date in service = 1914-1982

172 (frame & bougie) was used to build 207.

The second generation A-18 (series 2), with four exceptions, all entered into service in 1914. Three were placed in service in 1918 and the last vehicle in 1921. With D.A. Hendrie as Chief Mechanical Engineer it was understandable that all these cars should bear a strong resemblance to their NGR predecessors - SAR type A-16. Notwithstanding their obvious NGR ancestry, these vehicle's could lay claim to being the first dining cars built purely under the auspices of the SAR. Unlike the Series1 A-18s, they were in no way (apart from influence in design) connected with any pre-Union system. Thus 1914 became a red letter year in the history of SAR dining cars in that it witnessed the introduction of the first SAR design and engineered vehicles. Rather appropriately, the first car of this type to actually enter service was also numerically the first No. 165 placed in traffic in March 1914.

=== 196 Tewani ===
Twin Dining Cars

Type = A-22/AA23
Total = 13 (Series 1)
Number = see table below (Series 1)
Built = Pretoria shops (195-200), Durban shops (201-206)(
211 Built by Birmingham Railway Carriage & Wagon Company, England
Date in service = 1924-1980

No	Name	Date in service
195/250	Shangani	1924-1978
196/251	Tewani	1924-1980
197/252	Letaba	1924-1978
198/253	Umgeni	1924-1978
199/254	Umfolosi	1924-1980
200/255	Assegaai	1923-1978
201/256	Notwani	1923-1980
202/257	Omaruru	1924-1978
203/258	Usutu	1924-1980
204/259	Kunene	1924-1980
205/260	Umhlali	1924-1980
206/261	Lundi	1924-1978
211/262	Wembley (Umhlatuzi)	1926-1980

One coach of the twin unit contained the dining saloon and bar, while the second vehicle provided the pantry, kitchen and staff quarters. The dining saloon was characterised by seven pairs of carved roof-supporting pillars and archers - a feature which would, in time, represent a Victorian atmosphere much sought after by rail enthusiasts who thrive on living in the past. Conventional chairs provided seating for 46 passengers and a small bar was fitted at the outer end of the saloon. Wine-racks in the form of alcoves were built into panels between windows on the centre-line of each table. Lighting was rather elaborate-small cut glass lamps were fitted just above each alcove, while the saloon's main lights took the form of eight twin cut glass bowl units mounted on the clerestory ceiling. Three circulating fans were fitted. Notices proclaiming "Smoking is prohibited during meal hours. Niet roken gedurende de maal tijden" were painted in gold leaf at regular intervals on the varnished panels above the windows.

=== 199 Umfolosi ===
Twin Dining Cars

Type = A-22/AA23
Total = 13 (Series 1)
Number = see table below (Series 1)
Built = Pretoria shops (195-200), Durban shops (201-206)(
211 Built by Birmingham Railway Carriage & Wagon Company, England
Date in service = 1924-1980

=== 795 ===
Type = B-2
Total = 1
Number = 795 (588 old number)
Date in service =1929

In 1946, after the cessation of hostilities, the express service on the Cape route was resumed under the new official title Blue Train. It soon became apparent that as and when the air-condition lounge cars required repairs, a temporary replacement would have to be available. Car 588 was obvious choice for this role, but it required certain modifications and refitting to make it suitable for service on the Blue Train. After a measure of delay, it was extensively refitted in Pretoria Shops and released for service in June 1948.

The interior was altered as follows: the two original glass-paneled dividing arches were removed altogether while a cocktail bar was installed to one side in the middle of the saloon. The green interior colour scheme was replaced so as not to clash with the blue colours of the rest of the train. The original cornice lights were retained. The exterior was repainted in the Oxford blue and light grey colour scheme of the Blue Train. This livery replaced the Imperial Brown and was not far removed from the colours in which this car was painted some years earlier when she worked on the Union Limited.

In later years, loose contemporary style chairs and tables were placed in the lounge and the walls were covered with cocoa-coloured laminated plastic sheeting similar in colour and patterns to the material used in Drakensberg coaching stock. The original exterior body panels and dado boards were all replaced by plain cladding sheets. One legacy from her earlier days of glory remains - this the lounge is still illuminated by the original Cornish lights running the length of each side of the saloon. The glass in the light fitting is dark in colour and not the original amber stripes.

From 1948 to 1963, it served as the Blue Train spare and during this time- in October 1957- it was renumbered no. 795. From 1961 to 1963, this car actually worked on the Trans-Karroo Express while remaining a spare Blue Train duty. In 1963, the Blue Train was provided with two new lounge cars, thus releasing the old ones including spare No. 795. Since release from Trans-Karroo and Blue Train (spare) in 1963, it has been repainted in the standard red and grey livery and used on various special tour trains. Its use on special trains is naturally somewhat limited by demand, and it was not running much mileage in the latter years of its life. It was still available for service in March 1984.

=== 5092 ===
Type = M-19
Total = 4
Number = 5092 to 5095
Built in = Pretoria Shops
Date in service =1909

Four coaches of this type were placed in service during 1909 and 1910, the first being 5092 on 27 July 1909, having been built in Pretoria works of the then (Central South African Railways), the very progressive civil administration under which the railways of the two republics, Transvaal and Orange Free State were placed after the Boer War, on 1 July 1902. Originally numbered M-3 after Union this vehicle has seating capacity for 20 first and 28 second class passengers.

Coach 5092 was converted for use as third class in Pretoria in August 1963, becoming type S-10 and saw service at Pretoria and Kimberley.

=== 5267 ===
Type = M-36
Total = 26
Built in = Pretoria Shops
Number = 5255 to 5280
Date in service = 1933
To Seat = 45

These coaches were a cross between the main line saloons and the suburban coaches. Although classified as suburban stock they were divided into compartments but had neither upper bunks, wash basins nor fold down tables. Usually found in the consist of 'all station' main line the provided non- sleeping accommodation between main line stations. Although this series was purpose-built, this service was generally provided by down graded main line saloons.

=== 6009 ===
Type = P-6
Total = 2
Number = 6005 to 6006
Built in = Imported
Date in service = 1903

=== 468 ===
Type = C-9 (First class)
Total = 15
Number = 467-469, 471-475, 477-483
Built by =Metro-Cammell
Date in service = 1903

== Steam locomotives ==
Locomotives preserved at the museum are the following, as at 3 May 2017:

- Dock Shunter 0-4-0ST Stormberg, built by Hudswell Clarke & Company in 1903 for the Public Works Department of the Cape of Good Hope.
- 14 Tonner 0-4-0T no. 1, built by Maschinenfabrik Esslingen in 1889 for the Netherlands-South African Railway Company.
- Class A 4-8-2T no. 103, built by Dübs & Company in 1889 for the Natal Government Railways.
- Class B 0-6-4T no. 41, built as NZASM no. 197 Kracht by Maschinenfabrik Esslingen in 1897 for the Netherlands-South African Railway Company. (Incorrectly named Roos and President Kruger)
- Class G 4-8-2T no. 221, built by North British Locomotive Company in 1904 for the Natal Government Railways.
- Class H2 4-8-2T no. 330, built by Dübs & Company in 1903 for the Natal Government Railways.
- Class 6J 4-6-0 no. 645, built by Neilson, Reid & Company in 1902 for the Cape Government Railways.
- Class 7A 4-8-0 no. 1007, built by Neilson & Company in 1896 for the Cape Government Railways.
- Class 7A 4-8-0 no. 1009, built by Neilson & Company in 1896 for the Cape Government Railways. (Plinthed outside)
- Class 7BS 4-8-0 no. 1056, built by Neilson, Reid & Company in 1900 for the Imperial Military Railways.
- Class 16B 4-6-2 no. 805, built by North British Locomotive Company in 1917 for the South African Railways.
- Class 19C 4-8-2 no. 2439, built by North British Locomotive Company in 1935 for the South African Railways.
- Class 24 2-8-4 no. 3668, built by North British Locomotive Company in 1949 for the South African Railways.
- Class S2 0-8-0 no. 3706, built by Friedrich Krupp in 1952 for the South African Railways.
- Class GB 2-6-2+2-6-2 no. 2166, built by Beyer, Peacock & Company in 1921 for the South African Railways.
- Class GEA 4-8-2+2-8-4 no. 4023 Peacock, built by Beyer, Peacock & Company in 1945 for the South African Railways.
- Class GF 4-6-2+2-6-4 no. 2401, built by Hanomag in 1927 for the South African Railways.
- Class GL 4-8-2+2-8-4 no. 2351 Princess Alice, built by Beyer, Peacock & Company in 1930 for the South African Railways.
- Class GMAM 4-8-2+2-8-4 no. 4070, built by Henschel & Son in 1953 for the South African Railways.
- Class GO 4-8-2+2-8-4 no. 2575, built by Henschel & Son in 1953 for the South African Railways.
- Class NG15 2-8-2 no. NG122, built by Société Franco-Belge in 1949 for the Otavi Mining and Railway Company.

== Diesel-electric locomotives ==
- Class 91-000 no. 91-001,(Narrow Gauge 2 ft/610mm) built by General Electric in 1973 for the South African Railways.
- Class 32-000 no. 32-029, built by General Electric in 1959 for the South African Railways. (Not on display)
- Class 32-000 no. 32-042, built by General Electric in 1959 for the South African Railways. (Not on display)
