= Zuid-Afrikahuis =

Centre about South Africa in Amsterdam

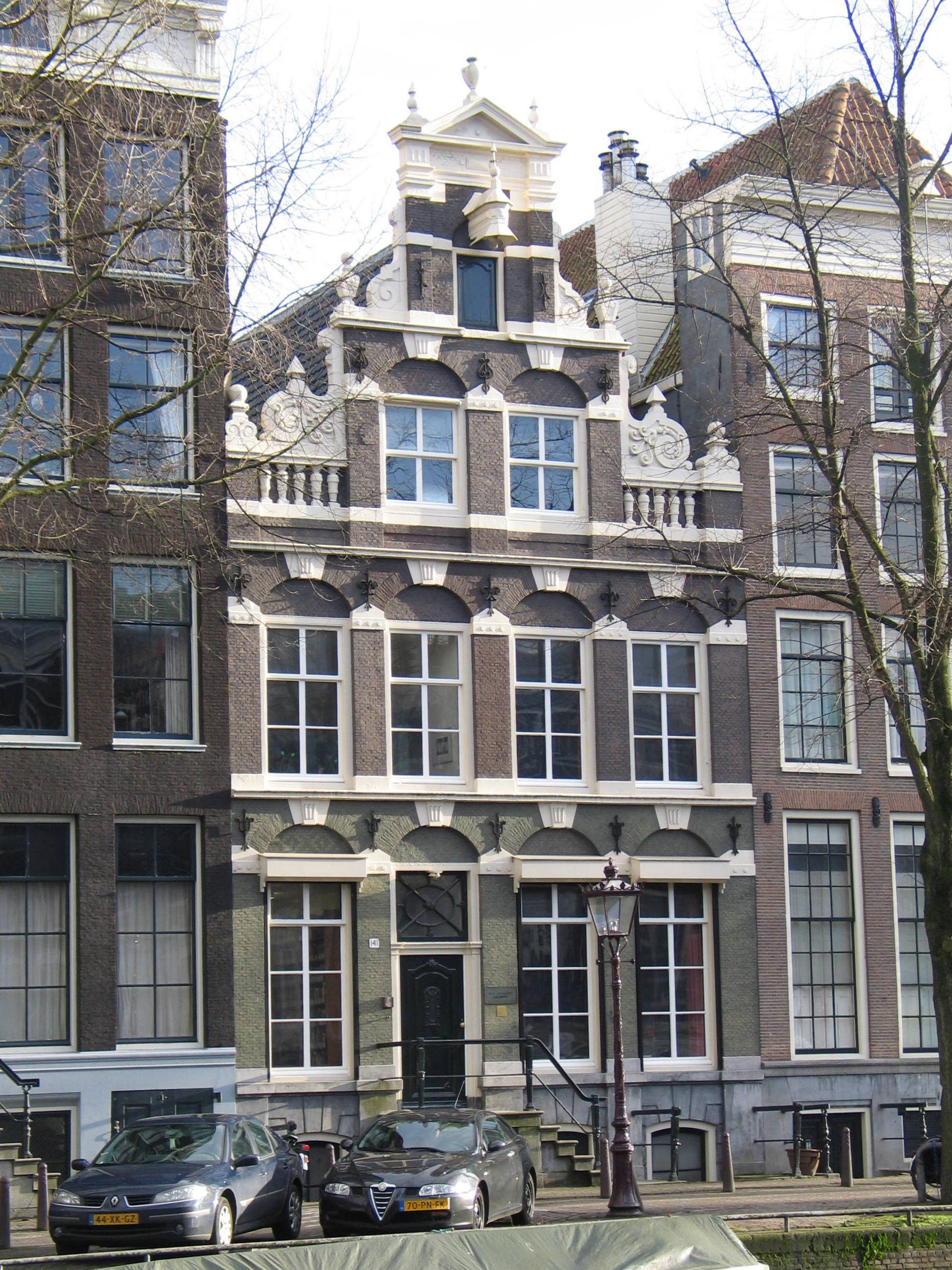
Zuid-Afrikahuis, Keizersgracht 141, Amsterdam

The Zuid-Afrikahuis (Dutch pronunciation: [zœyt ˈaːfrikaːˌɦœys]; South Africa House) is a central information point on South Africa in Amsterdam and contains the largest library on South Africa in the Netherlands. The institution also organizes literary evenings with writers and poets as well as holding cultural events. It also offers courses on the Afrikaans language. The Zuid-Afrikahuis is home to a number of organizations including: the foundation ZASM, the Nederlands-Zuid-Afrikaanse Vereniging (NZAV), the foundation Stichting Studiefonds (Foundation Study Fund for South African Students), and the Maandblad Zuid-Afrika (a monthly magazine).

== History ==
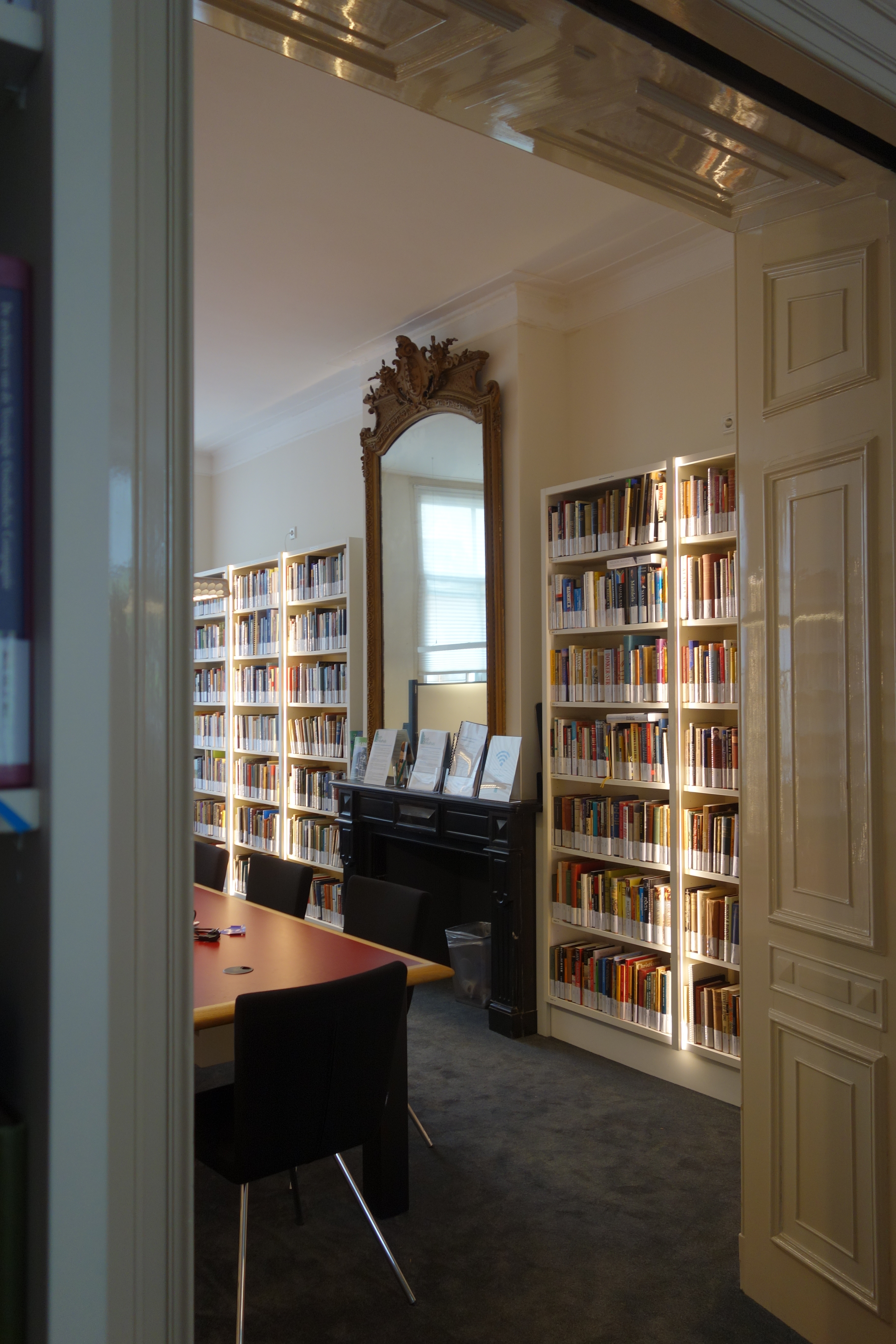
Library (2018)

The foundation for the advancement of the study of the language, literature and history of South Africa (1932) established an extraordinary chair in Afrikaans language and literature at the Municipal University of Amsterdam (now University of Amsterdam) in 1933. The Suid-Afrikaanse Instituut (SAI) was established in 1939 to provide a library for the chair. In 1950 the library was invited by the foundation ZASM to move to their building on Keizersgracht 141 in Amsterdam, where office and classroom space was also provided for the university chair. The goal of the NZAV and the foundation ZASM was to turn the property on Keizersgracht 141 into a South African cultural centre. However, during the 1980s the chair was abolished due to austerity at the University of Amsterdam.

The library of the Suid-Afrikaanse Instituut continued until 2013 when it was taken over by the foundation ZASM. The library possesses a collection of some 54,000 titles, about 40 ongoing and 550 discontinued periodicals, photographic materials and other documentation which together constitutes the largest collection of documents on South Africa outside of the country. The public may also loan certain items, though parts of the collection may only be viewed on the premises. The focus of the collection is both older and contemporary South African language, literature, history, art, politics, theology and social sciences. Notably this includes a large collection of photos from the South African War and many archival documents from the Netherlands-South African Railway Company (NZASM) as well as other personal and organizational archives.

The Keizersgracht building was closed for renovation in 2014, and reopened to the public in 2016. The current director of the Zuid-Afrikahuis is Judith Calmeyer Meijburg.

== Chair in South African Language and Literature ==
To maintain its focus on the education on South African literature, classes have been held every semester at the University of Amsterdam. At the start of the new millennium the Zuid-Afrikahuis was able to reestablish the chair in Afrikaans language and literature at Amsterdam University which was abolished in the 1980s. The current holder of this chair is Margriet van der Waal.

== Foundation Study Fund for South African Students (SSF) ==
The Stichting Studiefonds voor Zuid-Afrikaanse Studenten was established in 1885 and provided bursaries for South African students that wanted to spend 3 to 6 months in the Netherlands, typically as part of an exchange programme between Dutch and South African students in the humanities. This forms part of an MA degree or a thesis. The fund also gives travel bursaries for researchers who want to spend a shorter time in the Netherlands for research, courses or congresses.
