= South African Dock Shunter 0-4-0ST =

1903 design of steam locomotive

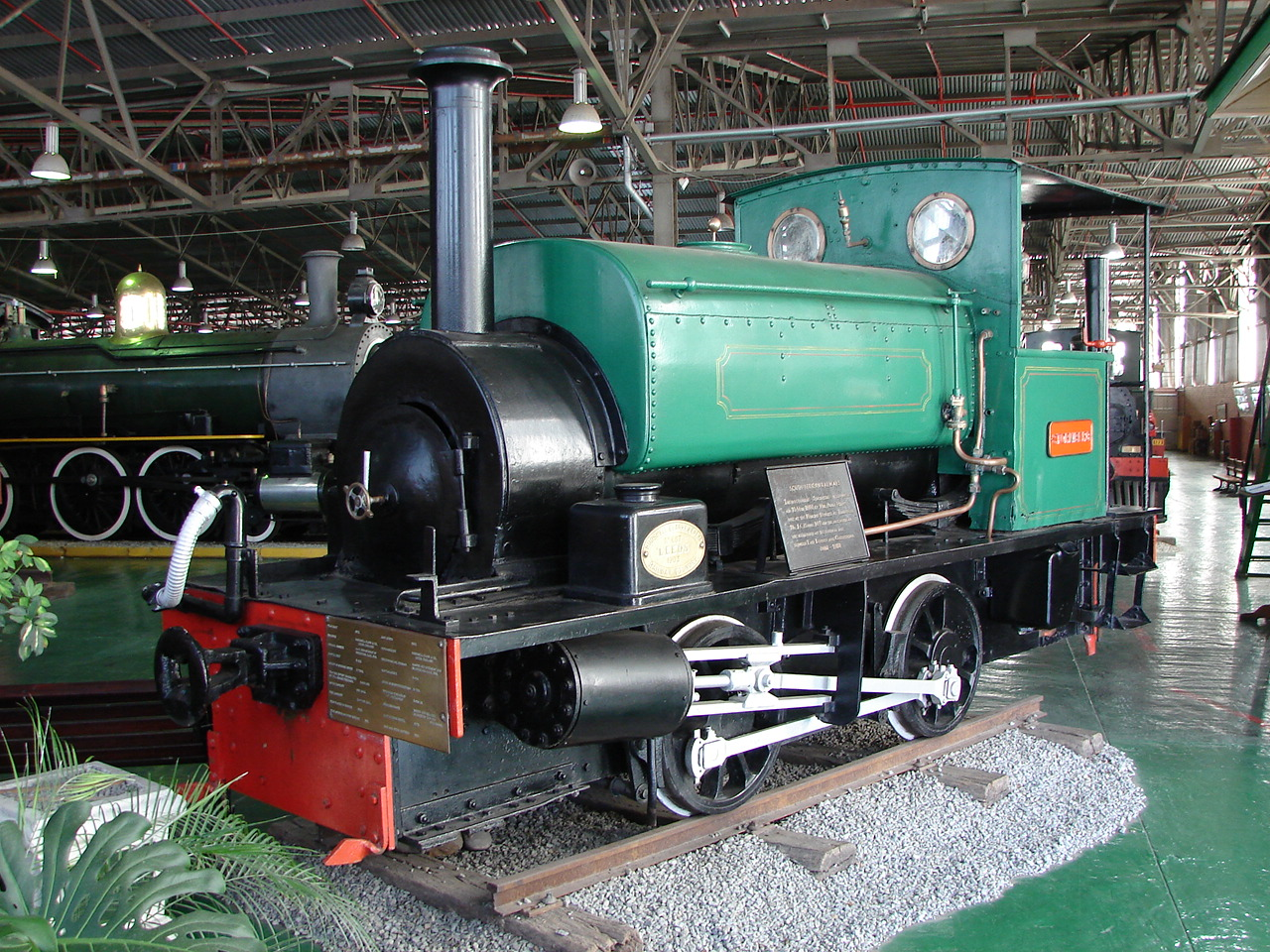
- The engine Stormberg, Outeniqua Transport Museum, 15 April 2013
Type and origin
- Power type: Steam
- Designer: Hudswell, Clarke and Company
- Builder: Hudswell, Clarke and Company
- Serial number: 686-687
- Build date: 1903
- Total produced: 2
Specifications
- Configuration
  - Whyte: 0-4-0ST
  - UIC: Bn2t
- Driver: 2nd coupled axle
- Gauge: 3 ft 6 in (1,067 mm) Cape gauge
- Coupled dia.: 33 in (838 mm)
- Wheelbase: 5 ft 6 in (1,676 mm)
- Length
  - Over couplers: 20 ft 7 in (6,274 mm)
  - Over beams: 17 ft (5,182 mm)
- Height: 10 ft 2 in (3,099 mm)
- Frame type: Plate
- Axle load: 7 LT 18 cwt (8,027 kg) average
- Adhesive weight: 15 LT 16 cwt (16,050 kg)
- Loco weight: 15 LT 16 cwt (16,050 kg)
- Fuel type: Coal
- Fuel capacity: 5 long hundredweight (0.3 t)
- Water cap.: 400 imp gal (1,820 L)
- Firebox
  - Type: Round-top
  - Grate area: 5.25 sq ft (0.488 m^{2})
- Boiler
  - Pitch: 5 ft 2 in (1,575 mm)
  - Tube plates: 8 ft 7 in (2,616 mm)
  - Small tubes: 58: 2 in (51 mm)
- Boiler pressure: 150 psi (1,034 kPa)
- Heating surface
  - Firebox: 32.5 sq ft (3.02 m^{2})
  - Tubes: 201.5 sq ft (18.72 m^{2})
  - Total surface: 234 sq ft (21.7 m^{2})
- Cylinders: Two
- Cylinder size: 10 in (254 mm) bore 16 in (406 mm) stroke
- Valve gear: Stephenson
- Couplers: Johnston link-and-pin
Performance figures
- Tractive effort: 5,454 lbf (24.26 kN) @ 75%
Career
- Operators: Cape Colony Irrigation Department; South African Railways
- Class: Harbour shunter
- Number in class: 2
- Numbers: PWD 1 & 2
- Official name: SAR Thebus & Stormberg
- Delivered: 1903
- First run: 1903 (PWD), 1916 (SAR)

The South African Railways Dock Shunter 0-4-0ST of 1903 was a steam locomotive from the pre-Union era in the Cape of Good Hope.

Two 0-4-0ST locomotives named Thebus and Stormberg, which were originally built for the Irrigation Department of the Public Works Department of the Cape of Good Hope in 1903, were acquired by the South African Railways in 1916 for use as harbour shunting engines. In railway service they were named instead of being classified and numbered.

== Origin ==
During the First World War, when the South African Railways (SAR) experienced an acute shortage of locomotive power, it acquired a number of locomotives from private concerns and other government departments.

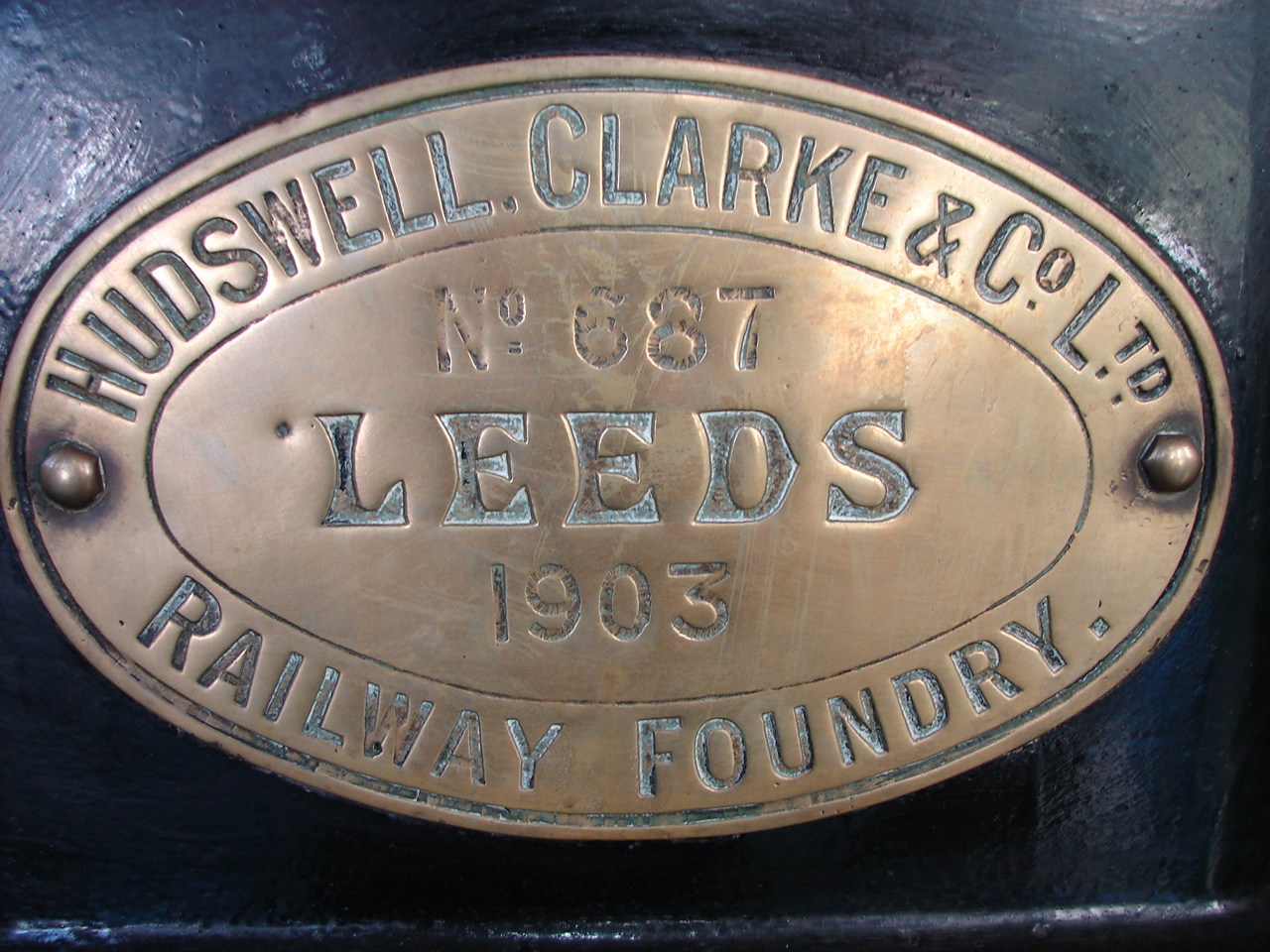

The Public Works Department (PWD) of the Cape Province had two locomotives, used by the Irrigation Department as dam construction engines, which it could spare. These two were donated to the SAR by the Department of Water Affairs in 1916. Numbered l and 2 by Water Affairs, they were 0-4-0ST locomotives which had been built by Hudswell, Clarke and Company Limited in 1903.

== Names ==
The locomotives were not classified or numbered by the SAR and were named instead. The first was named Thebus after the town Teebus on the line between Stormberg and Rosmead on the Cape Midland System, while the second was named Stormberg after the town of that name on the Cape Eastern System mainline from Springfontein to East London.

== Service ==
The engine Thebus spent most of its SAR service life as dock shunter at the Port Elizabeth Harbour.

The engine Stormberg spent most of its SAR service life as a dock shunter in East London Harbour until it was eventually semi-retired and used to test the steam-heating equipment on passenger coaches. During the Second World War, it was transferred to Cape Town for use as a construction locomotive during the expansion works at Table Bay Harbour. From there it went to Mosselbaai to once again serve as harbour shunting engine until it was transferred to Germiston in Transvaal, where it was retired and placed in storage for a number of years.

By then, the engine Stormberg was sporting a balloon-type spark arrester on its chimney and a headlight mounted on a shelf attached to the front of the smokebox.

== Preservation ==
In 1964, the engine Stormberg was refurbished at Germiston before being taken back to East London, where it was plinthed at East London station. It finally ended up as an exhibit in the Outeniqua Transport Museum in George. At some stage between being in storage at Germiston and becoming a museum exhibit, the spark arrester, headlight and headlight mount were removed.

The engine Thebus was presumably scrapped.

== Illustration ==
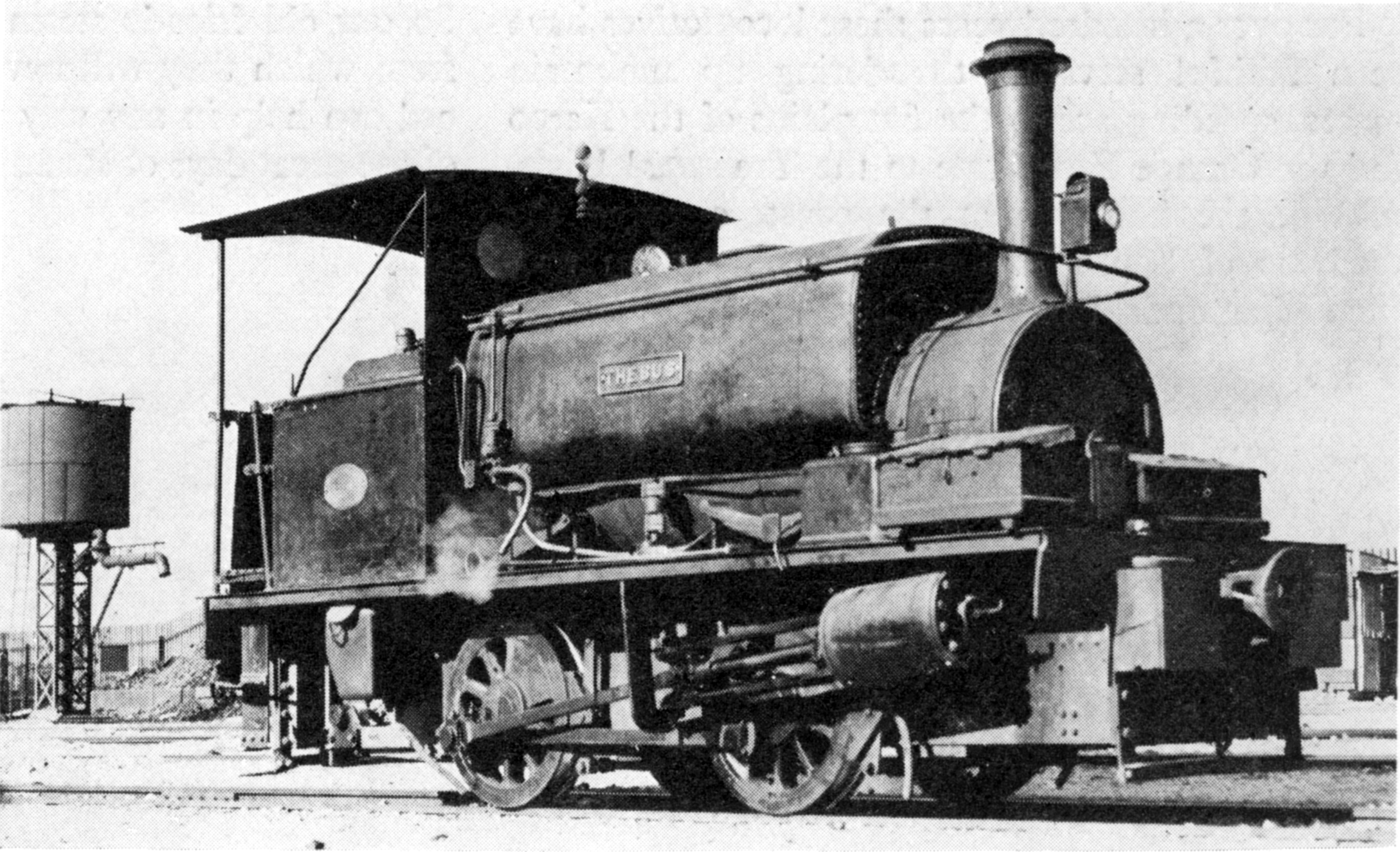
The engine Thebus in service, c. 1920

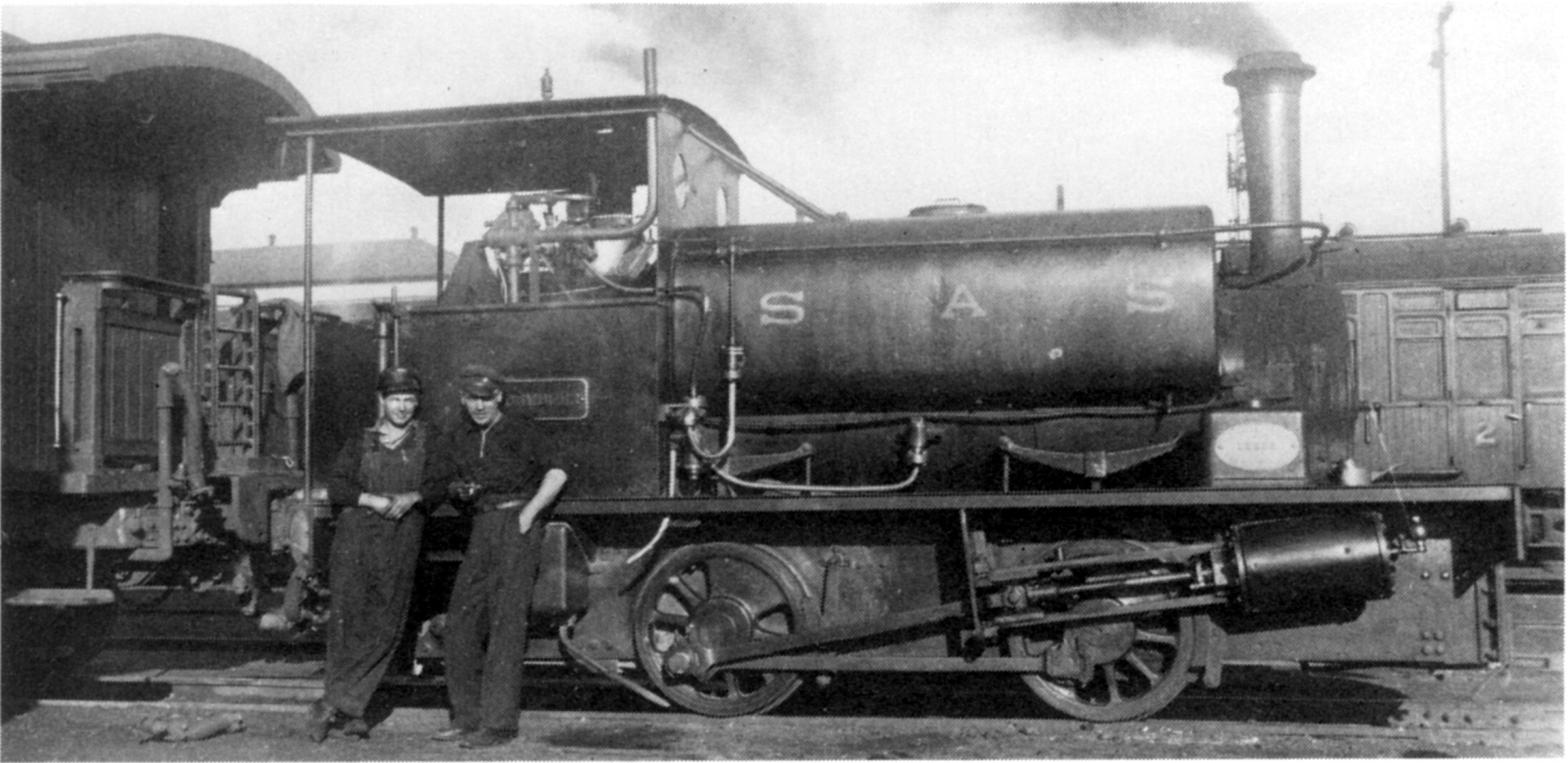
The engine Stormberg testing steam-heating equipment, c. 1920
