= NZASM 14 Tonner 0-4-0T =

Class of 5 South African 0-4-0ST locomotives from the pre-Union era

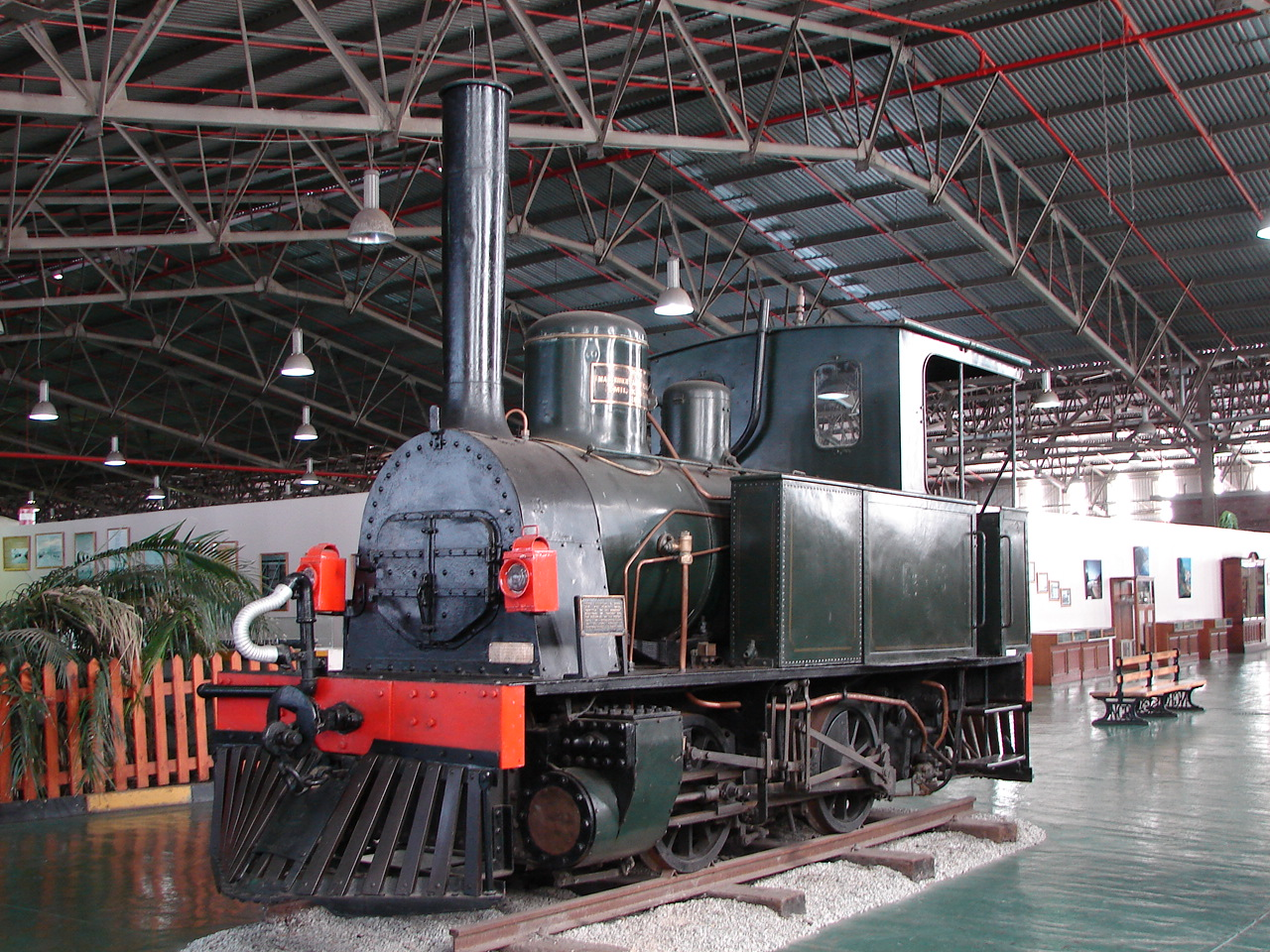
- No. 1 Transvaal at the Outeniqua Transport Museum, 15 April 2013
Type and origin
- Power type: Steam
- Designer: Maschinenfabrik Esslingen
- Builder: Maschinenfabrik Esslingen
- Serial number: 2317-2319, 2333-2334
- Build date: 1889
- Total produced: 5
Specifications
- Configuration
  - Whyte: 0-4-0T
  - UIC: Bn2t
- Driver: 2nd coupled axle
- Gauge: 3 ft 6 in (1,067 mm) Cape gauge
- Coupled dia.: 31 1/2 in (800 mm)
- Wheelbase: 5 ft 3 in (1,600 mm)
- Frame type: Plate
- Adhesive weight: 14 LT (14,220 kg)
- Loco weight: 14 LT (14,220 kg)
- Fuel type: Coal
- Fuel capacity: 7 long hundredweight (0.4 t)
- Water cap.: 560 imp gal (2,550 L)
- Firebox
  - Type: Round-top
  - Grate area: 7.1 sq ft (0.66 m^{2})
- Boiler
  - Pitch: 5 ft 4 1/2 in (1,638 mm)
  - Diameter: 3 ft 1 5/16 in (948 mm)
  - Tube plates: 6 ft 8 11/16 in (2,049 mm)
  - Small tubes: 88: 1 3/4 in (44 mm)
- Boiler pressure: 160 psi (1,103 kPa)
- Heating surface
  - Firebox: 34 sq ft (3.2 m^{2})
  - Tubes: 271 sq ft (25.2 m^{2})
  - Total surface: 305 sq ft (28.3 m^{2})
- Cylinders: Two
- Cylinder size: 11 in (279 mm) bore 15 3/4 in (400 mm) stroke
- Valve gear: Allan
- Valve type: Murdoch's D slide
- Couplers: Johnston link-and-pin
Performance figures
- Tractive effort: 7,623 lbf (33.91 kN) @ 75%
Career
- Operators: NZASM; Imperial Military Railways; Central South African Railways
- Class: NZASM 14 Tonner
- Number in class: 5
- Numbers: NZASM 1-5, IMR 601-605, CSAR A-D
- Official name: 14 Tonner
- Delivered: 1889
- First run: 1889
- Preserved: No. 1 Transvaal
- Scrapped: 1916

The NZASM 14 Tonner 0-4-0T of 1889 was a South African steam locomotive from the pre-Union era in Transvaal.

In 1889, the Nederlandsche-Zuid-Afrikaansche Spoorweg-Maatschappij acquired its first locomotives for use on the new railway which was being constructed from Johannesburg to Boksburg. Since the railway classified its locomotives according to their weight, these well-and-side-tank locomotives were known as the 14 Tonners.

== The Randtram line ==
As a result of the rapid development of the goldfields on the Witwatersrand in the 1880s and the demand for coal by the growing industry, the Volksraad of the Zuid-Afrikaansche Republiek (ZAR), also known as the Transvaal Republic, granted a concession to the Nederlandsche-Zuid-Afrikaansche Spoorwegmaatschappij (Netherlands-South African Railway Company, NZASM) on 20 July 1888 to construct a 16-mile-long (26-kilometre) railway from Johannesburg to Boksburg. The line, which was opened on 17 March 1890, became known as the Randtram line, even though it was a railway in every aspect and not dedicated to tram traffic. This was the first working railway in Transvaal.

The concession was extended the following year to continue the line eastwards to Springs, where coal was known to exist, and westwards via Roodepoort to Krugersdorp. The entire 49-mile-long (79-kilometre) line was opened to traffic on 10 February 1891.

== Manufacturer ==
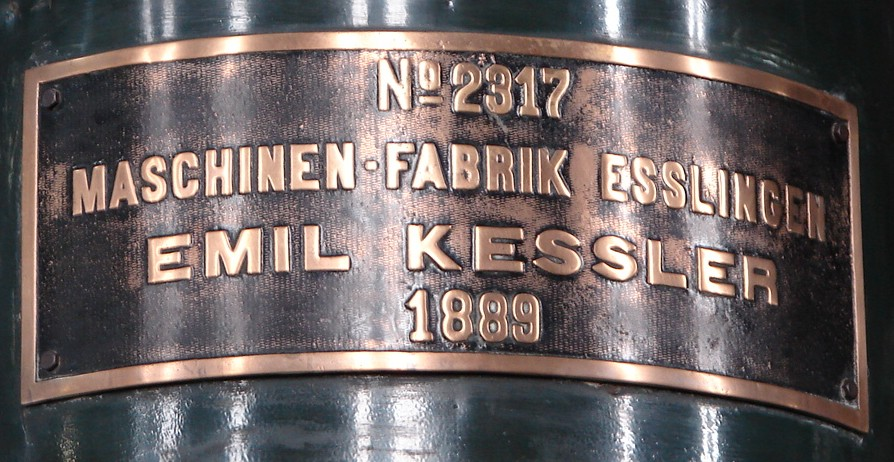
Works plate on 14 Tonner no. 1

In 1889, five well-and-side-tank locomotives with a 0-4-0 wheel arrangement, the first locomotives of the NZASM, were obtained from the German engineering firm and locomotive builder Maschinenfabrik Esslingen, owned by Emil Kessler. Since the NZASM classified its locomotives according to their weight, these engines were known as 14 Tonners. They were erected at Elandslaagte near Johannesburg, now the city of Germiston. The engines were numbered in the range from 1 to 5 and placed in service on the new railway to Boksburg.

== Characteristics ==
Their cylinders were arranged outside the plate frames. The Murdoch's D slide valves, mounted above the cylinders, were arranged at an incline and were actuated by Allan straight link motion. In this type of valve gear, the valve rod and the expansion link are respectively connected to opposing arms on the reversing shaft, so that partial rotation of the shaft moves the link and the die block in opposite directions.

Apart from the side tanks, the locomotive also had a well-tank between the frames under the boiler barrel. The dome was on the front section of the boiler and the regulator valve was arranged in the smokebox.

== Service ==
=== NZASM ===
As the Randtram line was expanded to the west and east to become the Reef line between Roodepoort and Springs, the 14 Tonners remained in service on that line, even though their range of operation was somewhat limited by their small coal and water carrying capacities.

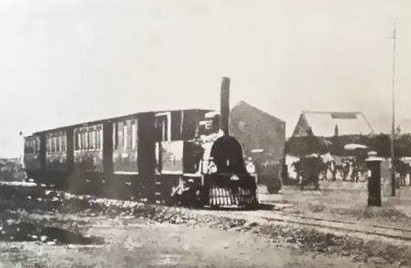
NZASM 14 Tonner on the Randtram line, c. 1890

The first locomotive, No. 1 named Transvaal, entered service on 18 July 1889. It hauled the first train on the Randtram line when it was opened on 17 March 1890 and was retired in December 1903, by which time it had covered a distance of 113,309 miles (182,353 kilometres).

=== Imperial Military Railways ===
All railway operations in the two Boer Republics, the ZAR and the Orange Free State, were taken over by the Imperial Military Railways (IMR) during the Second Boer War. The IMR renumbering register made provision for all five 14 Tonners in the number range from 601 to 605, but it is not known whether all five were renumbered.

=== Central South African Railways ===
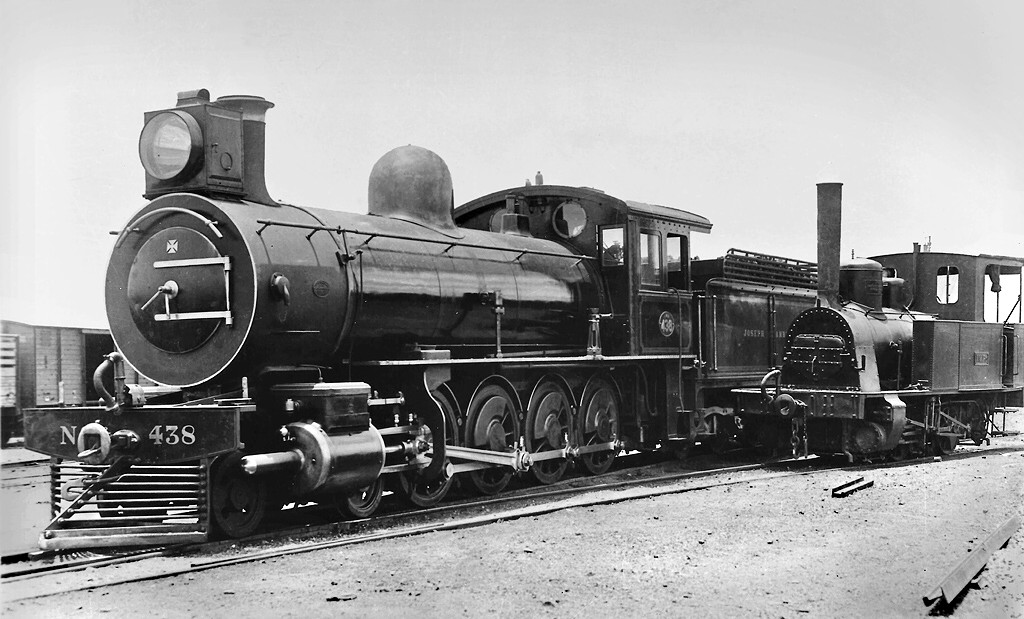
14 Tonner next to South African Class 8A 4-8-0 No. 438

At the end of the war when the IMR was transformed into the Central South African Railways (CSAR), either three or four of the 14 Tonners survived and were renumbered, either from CSAR numbers A to C or from A to D. The uncertainty arises from the fact that the renumbering register lists CSAR no. D as both NZASM 14 Tonner No. 5 and one of the NZASM 18 Tonner 0-6-0ST locomotives.

NZASM numbers 2, 3 and 5 were presumably allocated IMR numbers 602, 603 and 605 respectively, but apart from either IMR No. 602 or 603 which presumably became CSAR No. B, it is not known whether they were renumbered. All three of them were converted into stationary boilers at some stage. The gap in the CSAR renumbering (see table below) suggests that only one of NZASM numbers 2 and 3 survived into CSAR stock, presumably becoming CSAR No. B.

== Preservation ==
Even though none of the 14 Tonners were in service during the 1912 South African Railways renumbering, the last of four were not scrapped until 1916. NZASM No. 1 Transvaal was preserved and declared a national monument by Government Notice No. 529 on 6 April 1936. It was plinthed on Pretoria station until the late 1960s when it was moved to the new Johannesburg station. It is now exhibited in the Outeniqua Transport Museum in George, South Africa.

== Works numbers ==
The NZASM 14 Tonner works numbers, IMR and CSAR renumbering and their disposal are listed in the table.

NZASM 14 Tonner 0-4-0T
Loco no.	Works no.	IMR no.	CSAR no.	Stationary boiler no.
1	2317	601	A	Transvaal
2	2318	602?	B?	Boiler no. ?
3	2319	603?	B?	Boiler no. 1585
4	2333	604	C	
5	2334	605?	D?	Boiler no. ?

== Illustration ==
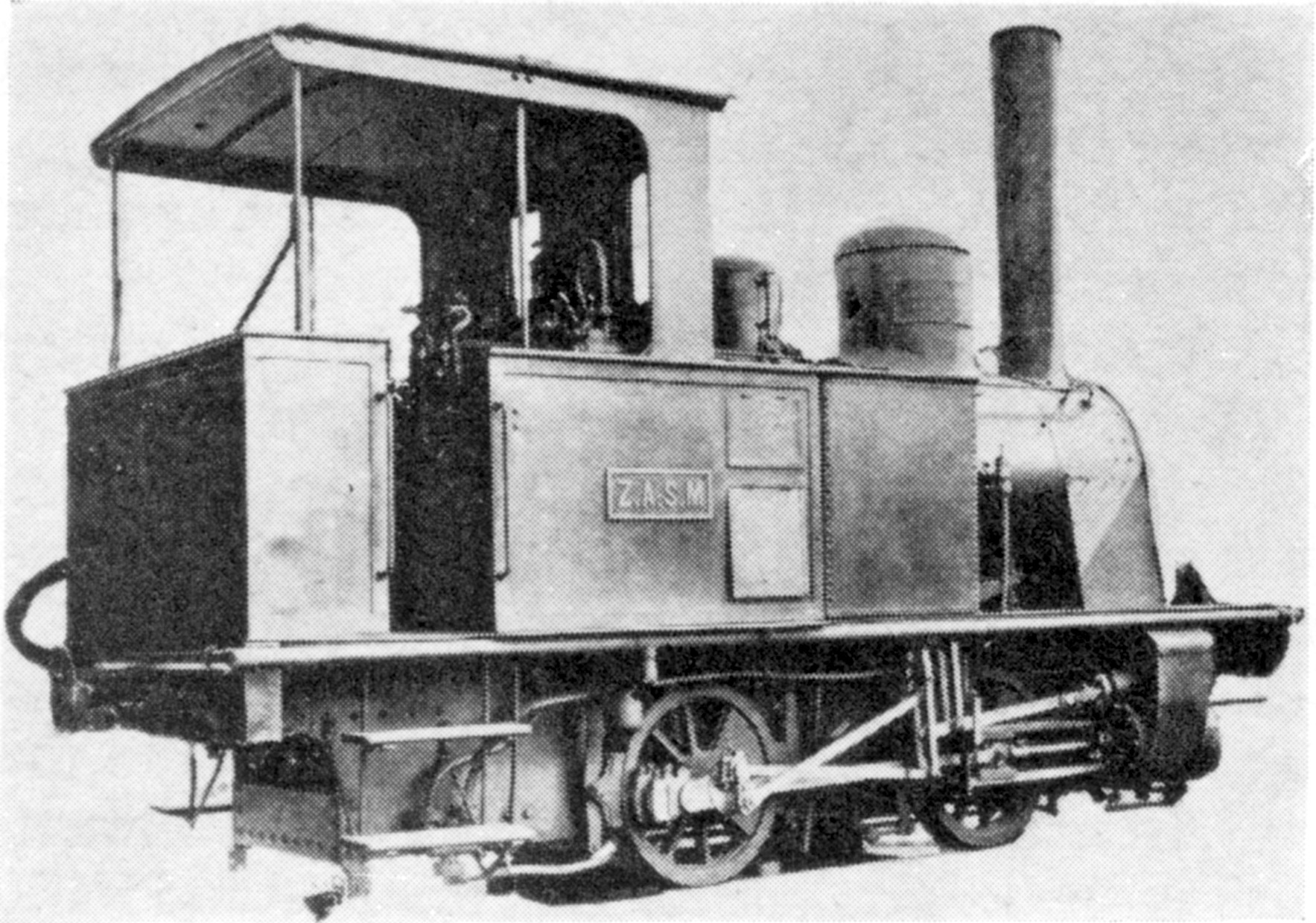
14 Tonner, without cowcatchers, c. 1900

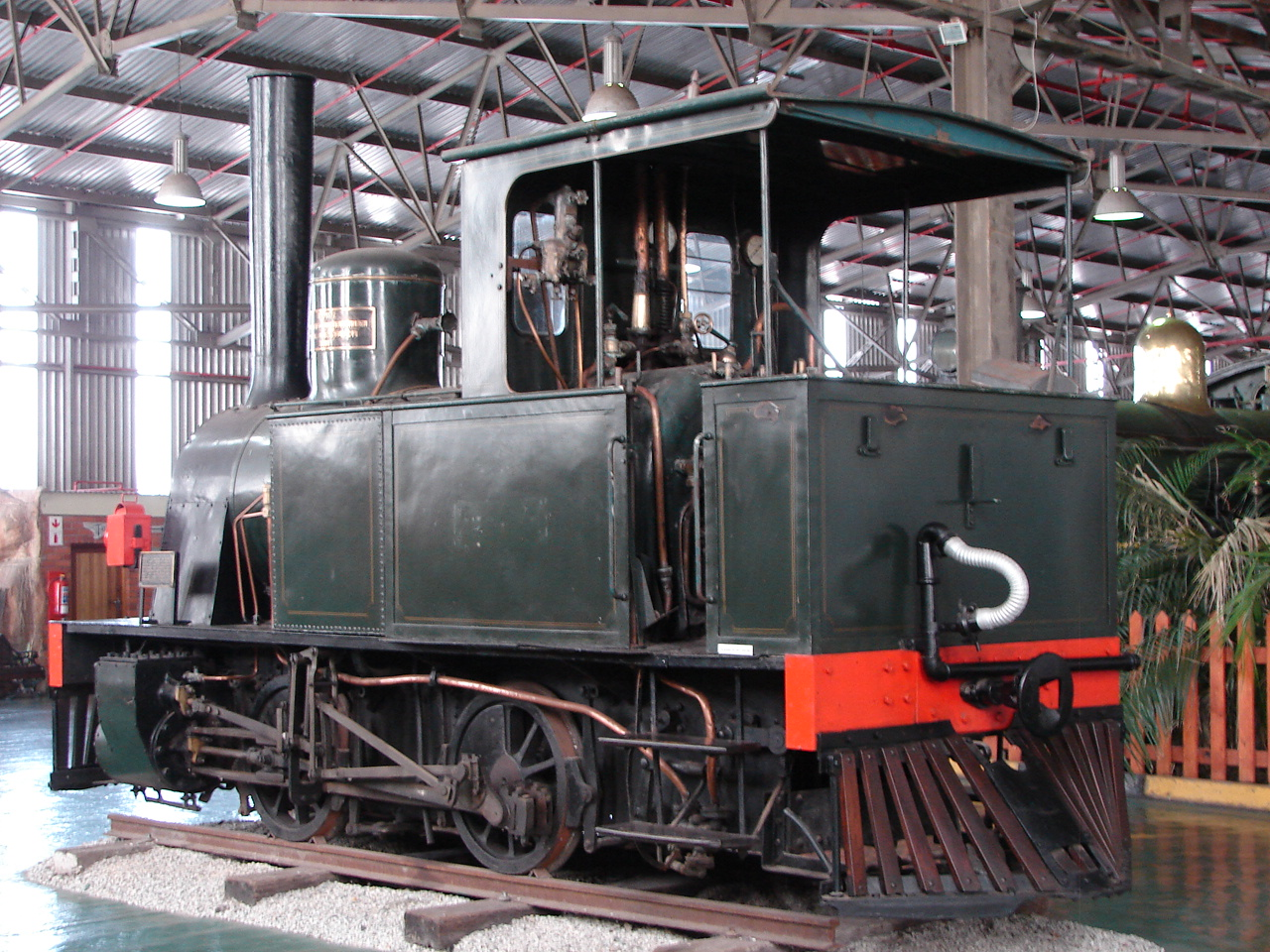
No. 1 Transvaal, Outeniqua Transport Museum, 15 April 2013
