= Netherlands–South African Railway Company =

Overview
- Main region: Southern Africa
- Stations called at: From Pretoria - Lourenço Marques to Pretoria - Johannesburg
- Type: Listed Company
- Defunct: 13 October 1908
- Headquarters: Amsterdam, Netherlands and Pretoria, South Africa
- Number of employees: ca. 1500 Dutch employees; an unknown number of South African employees
- Dates of operation: 1887–1902
- Successor: Central South African Railways

Technical
- Track gauge: 1,067 mm (3 ft 6 in)
- Track length: ca. 1147 km

The Netherlands–South African Railway Company (Nederlandsche Zuid-Afrikaansche Spoorwegmaatschappij; Nederlands-Suid-Afrikaanse Spoorwegmaatskappy) or NZASM (also sometimes called SASM in South Africa) was a railway company established in 1887. The company was based in Amsterdam and Pretoria, and operated in the South African Republic (ZAR) during the late 19th century. At the request of ZAR president Paul Kruger, the NZASM constructed a railway line between Pretoria and Lourenço Marques in Portuguese East Africa (now Maputo in Mozambique).

== Background ==
The British conquered the then Dutch Cape Colony in 1806. The new administration was not universally accepted by the Dutch colonists and after the 1830s thousands of Dutch-speaking colonists (called Boers) migrated to the interior of Southern Africa. This migration, known as the Great Trek, resulted in the establishment of 14 independent republics. By the mid 19th century these republics had merged into the two larger republics: The South African Republic (ZAR) and the Republic of the Orange Free State. The British Empire eventually recognized the independence of these republics in 1852 and 1854.

The relationship between the British and the Boers remained strained throughout the 19th century, especially as a result of the First Boer War (1880–81). Both republics were located in the interior of what is now South Africa, with no route to the coast that did not pass through the British-held Cape Colony and Colony of Natal. Paul Kruger, president of the ZAR, decided that an alternative trade route to the ocean was a priority for the ZAR. The Witwatersrand Gold Rush after 1886 resulted in the rapid industrialization of the ZAR, making access to the ocean even more important, and allowed the suddenly cash-flush republic to invest in large-scale infrastructure projects.

It will set an indelible seal upon the freedom, the independence, the nationality of the Republics, and will put an effectual barrier on the extension of British dominion over the Vaal and Orange Rivers, it will make it perfectly immaterial to us whether the Liberals or Conservatives in England, or Molteno or Patterson at the Cape, are in power.

— Free State Express, quoted in James Stanley Little, South Africa: A Sketchbook of Men, Manners and Facts (1887) Swan, Sonnenschein, Lowrey & Co. London. p.266.

== Establishment ==
In 1874 the Volksraad of the ZAR decided that a railway would be built connecting the ZAR with Lourenço Marques on Delagoa Bay in Portuguese East Africa (now Maputo in Mozambique). A commission was established in 1874 to create a plan for the construction of this railway. After initial success in raising capital and acquiring a railway concession from the Portuguese government, the project was stalled by the outbreak of the First Boer War. After the end of the war in 1881 the project was resumed, this time with renewed enthusiasm due to the threat of British domination over the Boer Republics. In 1884 a concession was granted to a group of Dutch investors, and this was followed by the official establishment of the Netherlands–South African Railway Company on 21 June 1887 in Amsterdam in the Netherlands, funded by Dutch, German, and Boer investors.

The Pretoria - Delagoa Bay line, with a length of 562 kilometres (ca. 350 miles), was opened on 6 November 1894 and is still in use today. The railway company employed about 3000 people. Of these, about 1500 were employed in the construction of the Pretoria - Delagoa Bay Line. It adopted the 3 ft 6 in (1,067 mm) (Cape Gauge) of the neighbouring Cape Government Railways.

On 19 February 1896, a train loaded with dynamite was struck by a shunter while being unloaded. The resulting Braamfontein Explosion was one of the largest artificial non-nuclear explosions in history, resulting in more than 70 deaths and 200 injuries.

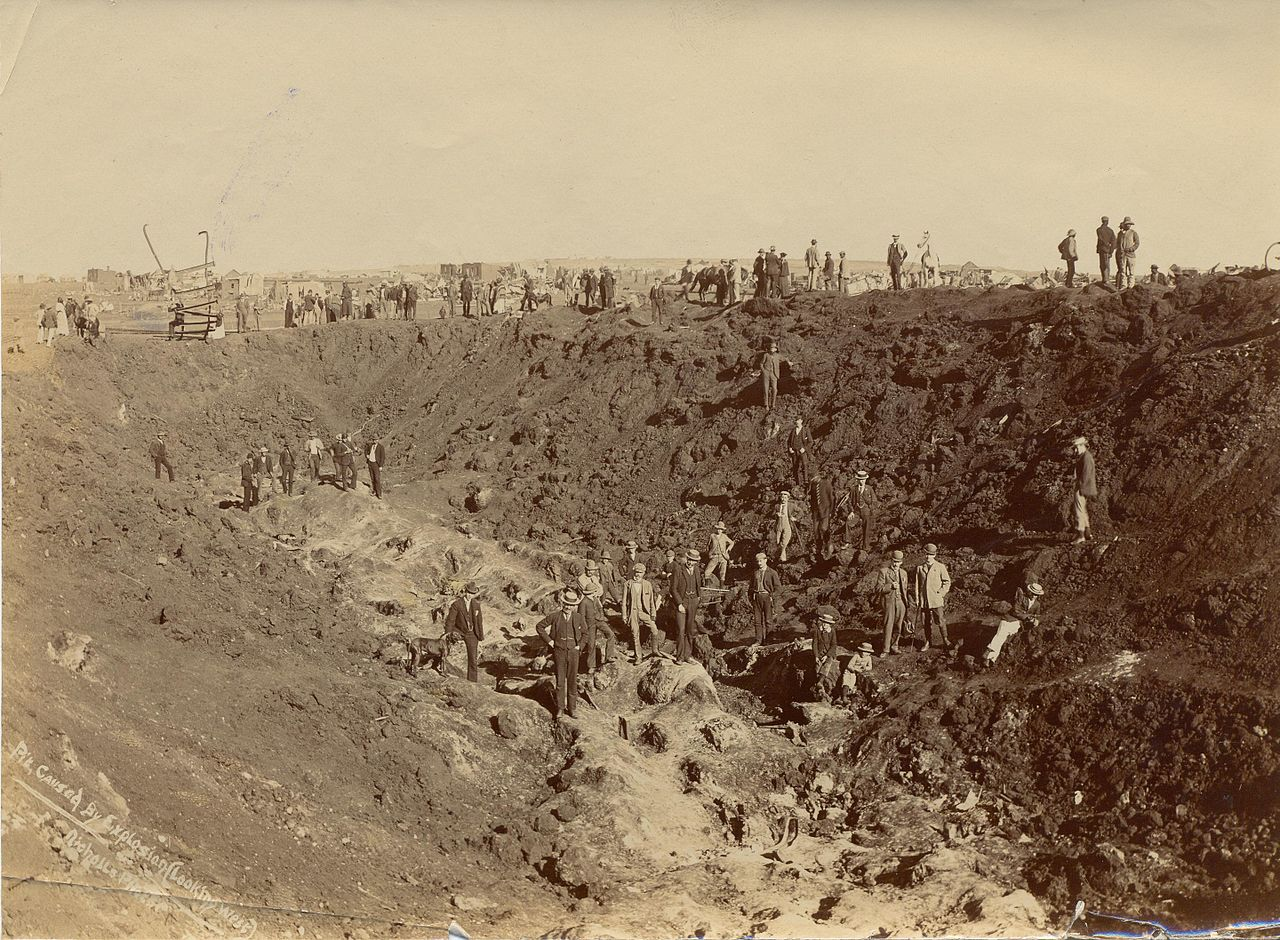
The crater created by the dynamite explosion (looking west) at Maraisburg on 19 February 1896.

In 1897, a new station was constructed in Johannesburg. The building was constructed in 1895 in Rotterdam and was used in the Amsterdam Exhibition before being dismantled and shipped to Johannesburg, where it was rebuilt in 1897. Although Johannesburg Park Station has twice been reconstructed, the 1897 building was preserved and moved a short distance to Newtown where it still stands, unused, today.

By 1899, the NZASM had constructed 1147 kilometres (ca. 712 miles) of railway.

== The Randtram Line ==
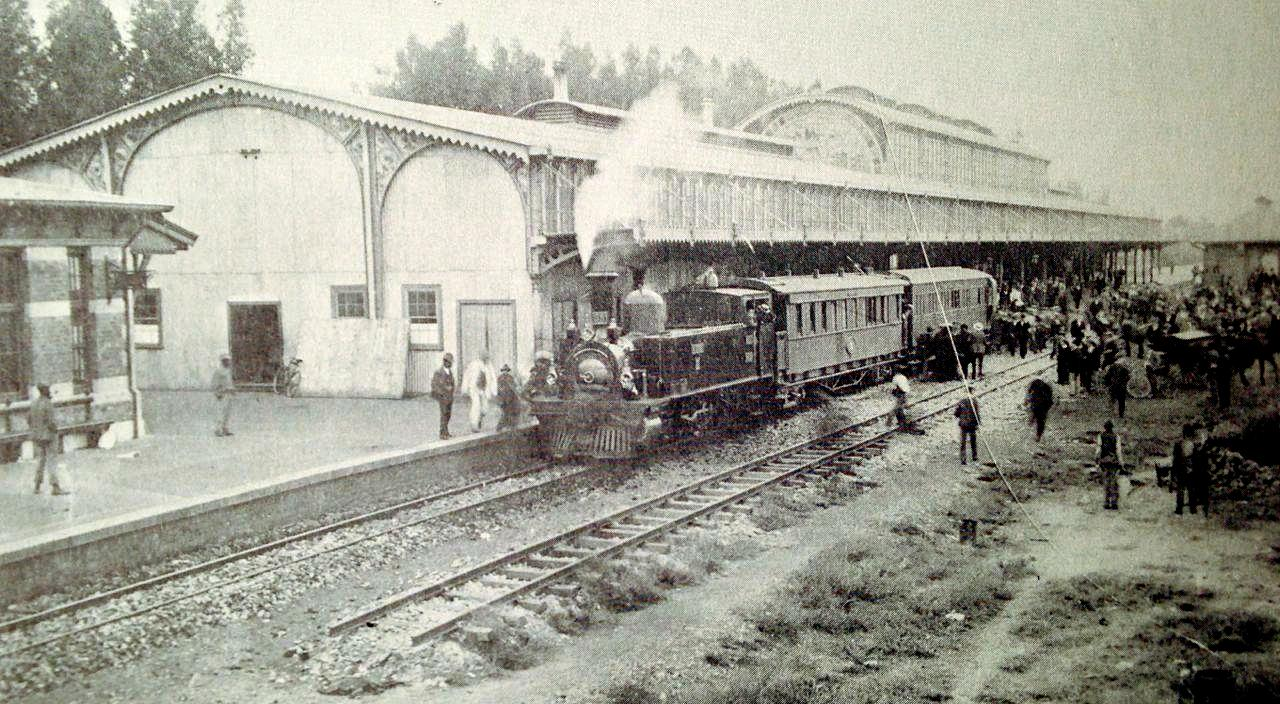
North-eastern view of the covered Platform of the Johannesburg Park Station on the Randtram line from Johannesburg to Boksburg in the year 1897.

As a result of the rapid development of the goldfields on the Witwatersrand in the 1880s and the demand for coal by the growing industry, on 20 July 1888 the ZAR government granted a concession to the NZASM to construct a 16 miles (26 kilometres) railway line from Johannesburg to Boksburg. The line was opened on 17 March 1890, with the first train being hauled by a 14 Tonner locomotive. It became known as the "Randtram", even though it was actually a railway in every aspect and not singularly dedicated to tram traffic. This was the first working railway line in the Transvaal.

The concession was extended the following year to continue the line eastward to Springs, where coal was known to exist, and westward via Roodepoort to Krugersdorp. The entire 49-mile (79-kilometre) line was opened to traffic on 10 February 1891.

In 1889 and 1890, the NZASM obtained three tramway steam locomotives with an 0-4-0T wheel arrangement for use on the Randtram line. Since the railway classified its locomotives according to their weight, these tank locomotives were known as the 10 Tonners. As the Randtram line was expanded to the west and east to become the Reef line between Roodepoort and Springs, the 14 Tonners remained in service on that line, even though their range of operation was somewhat limited by their small coal and water carrying capacities. The first locomotive, No. 1, named Transvaal, entered service on 18 July 1889. It hauled the first train on the Randtram line when it was opened on 17 March 1890, and was retired in December 1903, by which time it had covered a distance of 113,309 miles (182,353 kilometres).

By 1899 the Randtram Line had expanded to a length of 82 kilometres (ca. 51 miles).

== Pretoria–Delagoa Bay Line (Oosterlijn) ==
In order to have an outlet to a harbour, a railway line from Delagoa Bay in Portuguese East Africa to Pretoria had been proposed to the Volksraad of the ZAR by President F.T. Burgers as far back as 1872. The Portuguese supported the idea, since it would open a trade route from Portuguese East Africa into the interior. In 1883, Major Joachim Machado was sent to the Transvaal to report on a proposed route through the Komati River and Crocodile River valleys towards the Highveld and Pretoria. The resulting agreement was for the Portuguese to construct the section from Delagoa Bay to the border at Komatipoort, while the ZAR would be responsible for the continuation of the line to Pretoria.

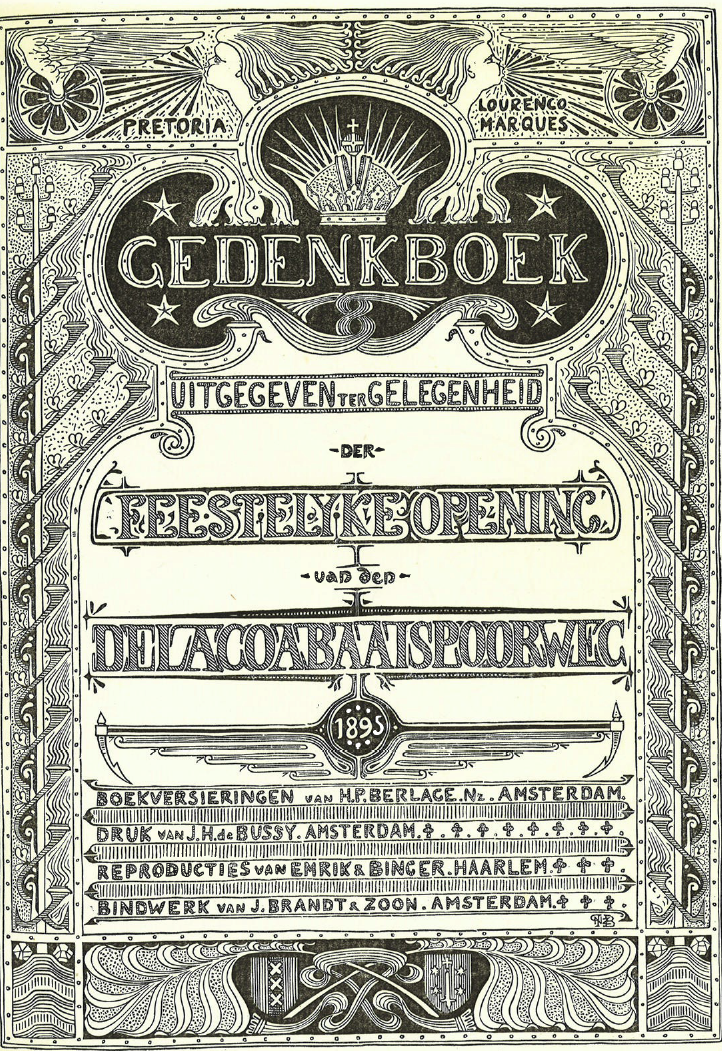
Frontispiece of the book published to commemorate the opening of the NZASM's Pretoria - Delagoa Bay Railway on 1 January 1895.

The Portuguese line from Delagoa Bay had already reached the border on 14 December 1887, but the first train from Delagoa Bay only entered Komatipoort on 1 July 1891, when the NZASM's contractors completed the bridge across the Komati River. The line from Komatipoort to Nelspruit was completed by 20 June 1892. Waterval Boven was reached on 20 June 1894 and Balmoral, near Witbank, on 20 October 1894, connecting with the line which had simultaneously been built eastwards from Pretoria.

The construction of the railway line from Delagoa Bay to Pretoria was beset with difficulties, both in terms of disease and engineering. Malaria claimed many lives among the construction crews, and some of the terrain was mountainous. In the Elandspruit Valley, where the river formed a 295-foot-high (90 m) waterfall, the adjacent cliffs presented a natural barrier to the continuation of the railway from the Eastern Transvaal Lowveld up to the Transvaal Highveld.

In terms of construction, the climb up the escarpment was arguably the most difficult section to be encountered by the railway builders on the route. When the line reached Waterval Onder, they had a choice between a lengthy detour with sharp curves and costly deep cuttings, embankments and viaducts, to comply with the agreed upon gradient of 1 in 50 (2%), or a shorter 4 1/2-mile-long (7.2 km) section, which would entail a gradient of 1 in 20 (5%) over a distance of 2.1 miles (3.4 kilometres) in one place, as well as a 233-yard-long (213 m) tunnel.

The shorter and steeper route was selected. While a gradient of 1 in 20 (5%) is not insurmountable by light trains with orthodox adhesion locomotives, safety and economical considerations led to the decision to install a rack track on the section up the escarpment between Waterval Onder and Waterval Boven. The rack track was built to the Riggenbach system which was in use on European mountain railways, with the rack laid between the rails.

The line, also known as the Oosterlijn (East Line) from Pretoria to Lourenço Marques had a total length of 562 kilometres (ca. 350 miles), of which 472 kilometres (ca. 293 miles) formed part of the Oosterlijn. The full line followed the following route:*

- Pretoria (start)
- Bronkhorstspruit
- East Rand
- Middelburg
- Waterval Boven
- Nelspruit
- Komatipoort (last stop in South Africa)

Border crossing between South Africa and Mozambique

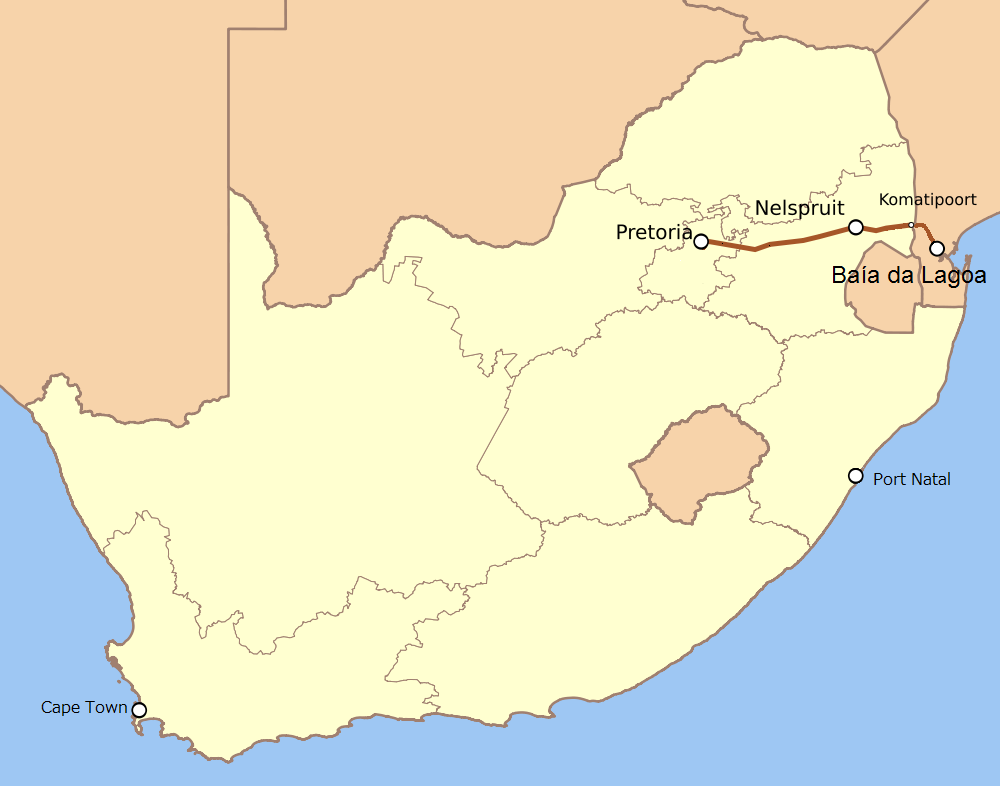
The route of the Pretoria–Maputo Line

- Ressano Garcia (first stop in Mozambique)
- Moamba
- Lourenço Marques (Maputo since 1975)
- Maputo Bay - (end)

(*) In the above list, only the major settlements on the line are named; the station names are not given.

The line was officially inaugurated on 1 January 1895. Today the line runs through the South African provinces of Gauteng and Mpumalanga. These two provinces, which previously made up the Transvaal Province, contain part of the territory of the former ZAR (along with Limpopo).

After the completion of the Pretoria - Maputo line, a second, much shorter line was laid down between Pretoria and Johannesburg. It adopted the 3 ft 6 in (1,067 mm) of the neighbouring Cape Government Railways.

== Other Lines ==
The rail network of the NZASM in 1899 at the outbreak of the South African War. Non-NZASM railway lines are coloured grey.

In addition to the Randtram and Pretoria - Delagoa Bay Lines the NZASM operated another 4 lines:

- Kaapmuiden - Barberton, a 55 kilometre (ca. 34 miles) sideline of the Oosterlijn.
- Zuiderlijn (South Line), intended to connect to the Cape Colony via the Orange Free State, ran from Pretoria - Kaalfontein - Zuurfontein - Elandsfontein (Johannesburg) - Vereeniging - Viljoensdrift (border with the Orange Free State). The total line from Pretoria to Cape Town was 1674 kilometres (ca. 1040 miles), of which 125 kilometres (ca. 78 miles) was controlled by the NZASM.
- Zuid-Oosterlijn (Southeast Line), intended to connect to the Colony of Natal, ran from Elandsfontein (Johannesburg) - Heidelberg - Standerton - Charleston - Volksrust (border with the Colony of Natal). The total line from Pretoria to Durban was 812 kilometres (ca. 505 miles), of which 256 kilometres (ca. 160 miles) were part of the Zuid-Oosterlijn.
- Zuid-Westerlijn (Southwest Line), intended to connect to the Orange Free State, ran from Krugersdorp - Potchefstroom - Klerksdorp (border with the Orange Free State) with a length of 156 kilometres (ca. 97 miles).

A 1 kilometre track at Elandsfontein near Johannesburg provided a connection between the Zuiderlijn, the Zuid-Oosterlijn, and the Zuid-Westerlijn.

=== Barberton branch line ===
In 1882, George Pigot Moodie, Surveyor General of the ZAR, suggested that the Oosterlijn needed to reach Ermelo through the Cape River Valley rather than through Nelspruit. This was all later rendered moot, as the discovery of gold in 1884 in the Cape Valley near Barberton required the building of a branch line to the mines. The cost of construction was so significant, given the mountainous terrain, that the ZAR government objected. The local business Lewis, Marks & Watkins formed a syndicate to build the line and the work was contracted to Pettegrew & Co. After heavy rain damaged the bridge, the contractor went bankrupt and the syndicate was dissolved. NZASM took over construction and completed the line in 1896.

=== Zuiderlijn ===
The Zuiderlijn was the NZASM's shortest line leaving the ZAR, but was the also the furthest distance inland. In 1888, the Cape Colony and Orange Free State governments agreed to build a railway between Port Elizabeth and Bloemfontein. The Cape government paid for the line and it was built by the Cape Government Railways (CGR). The section from Port Elizabeth to Colesberg was already complete, and the line from Colesberg to Bloemfontein opened on 17 December 1890.

The building of the Oosterlijn progressed slowly by comparison. In May 1890, the rapid population growth of Johannesburg and the need to ship in heavy mining equipment required a railway to reach the city. In June 1890, the ZAR assented to the building of a line between Pretoria and the Vaal River bridge. Construction began two months later, but the NZASM had financial problems and the project stalled.

Through an agreement made by James Silverwright, a member of the Afrikaner Bond and of Cecil Rhodes's cabinet, the Cape Colony's own CGR built its own line to Pretoria. The CGR would operate the ZAR portion of the line for two years before handing it over to the NZASM. On 7 May 1892, the line was completed from Bloemfontein to the Vaal River Bridge (the border of the ZAR); on 15 September 1892, the line from the Vaal River Bridge to Germiston (65 km) opened; and on 1 January 1893, Pretoria was connected to Cape Town as well as Port Elizabeth.

Upon completion of this railway line, it became possible to import heavy machinery, both for gold mining and for the construction of the western portion of the Oosterlijn.

=== Zuid-Oosterlijn ===
The Zuid-Oosterlijn was the last of the three NZASM lines connected to foreign rail lines and the coast.

After the discovery of gold, the Cape Colony and the Colony of Natal raced to connect the Rand with the coast. Until the line from Ladysmith reached Newcastle, the governments of Natal and the ZAR agreed to extend the line from Newcastle to the Rand. The line reached Newcastle on 15 May 1890, and was immediately extended to Charlestown, the last town in Natal leading up to the ZAR border. The railway, which climbed 452 m in the 57 km between Newcastle and Charlestown, was opened by President Kruger of the ZAR and the Governor of Natal on 7 April 1891. When it reached Laing's Nek Pass, a 674-m tunnel was built to move it through. The NGR (Natal Government Railways) line had already reached Charlestown on 7 April 1891, but President Kruger did not give them permission to extend their line into the ZAR before the Oosterlijn was finished to Delagoa Bay.

The Delagoa Bay line was commissioned on 1 January 1895. In accordance with the terms of an agreement forged on 3 February 1894, between the ZAR government and the NGR, the NGR built the 250-km link between the Natal-ZAR border and the existing NZASM rail network. The first portion of 210 km between the border and Heidelberg opened on 27 April 1895, and the remainder opened on 15 November of that same year. On 1 December 1895, the 4-km link between the border and Charlestown opened, and that 15 December, the 41-km link between Heidelberg and Union Junction (9 km from Germiston) opened.

In November 1894, the ZAR and Great Britain agreed to meet in Swaziland, with President Kruger and the British High Commissioner Sir Henry Loch as signatories. Neither Kruger nor Loch's countries recognized each other diplomatically, and therefore a passenger wagon was wheeled onto the bridge in between and the negotiators returned to their home countries. As the agreement was signed a year before the line's opening, it appears that this short rail line was completed before the Volksrust-Standerton line was built, and that it was used to transport railway construction goods to the area.

The government of Natal paid for the line. They were eager to pay the costs since they anticipated profits that would more than cover the expense.

=== Zuid-Westerlijn ===
In 1885, the Cape railway reached Kimberley, and the following year, when the ZAR had difficulty obtaining a £5,000 loan and McMurdo struggled to build the Delagoa Bay line through the swamps near Delagoa Bay, President Kruger and the Cape government proposed extending the Kimberley line to near the Rand. No agreement was reached, and therefore the Zuid-Westerlijn started as a domestic rather than an international line.

Gold was discovered in August 1886 on Rietvlei Farm near Klerksdorp, and therefore the Randtram line was built between Krugersdorp and Springs. On 18 August 1884, the Volksraad decided to build a line between Krugersdrop and Klerksdorp. This line, the Zuid-Westerlijn, was an extension of the Randtram with the same gauge. NZASM was not eager to build the line since they realized it would be unprofitable. Eventually, the ZAR government and NZASM agreed that the government would cover half of the costs and guarantee the NZASM's interest. The route was surveyed during the first half of 1894, and on 18 September of that year, the Volksraad granted the permit to start construction. Construction began on 18 July 1895, and after the work was delayed by the Jameson Raid, the line opened to near Potchefstroom on 11 July 1897, and finally began serving Klerksdorp on 3 August.

In 1897, the line carried 3,975 passengers boarding at Klersdorp station, more than 270 tons of freight, and around 1,848 horses, livestock, and vehicles. Income was £5,976, but expenses were £6,779. At the beginning of 1898, to help the gold mining industry, railway tariffs were lowered, despite losses growing to £13,047 by the end of that year.

In 1905, after the NZASM was merged into the Central South African Railways (CSAR), the Zuidwesterlijn was extended to Fourteen Streams (near Warrenton), and today the line is served by the Blue Train.

== Locomotives ==
The NZASM did not classify locomotives into specific classes - the eight types used in their fleet were known by their weight.

At the end of the 19th century, the German locomotive industry was growing rapidly and had outpaced that of the United Kingdom. Since the NZASM was a Dutch company financed by 50% Dutch and 47% German capital, most of its locomotives were German-built. Out of 258 locomotives in the fleet, 249 were designed by the German firm Maschinenfabrik Esslingen, six by the British manufacturer Manning Wardle, and Louis Smulders & Co. out of Utrecht, Netherlands. Although most of the locomotives were built by their developers, 26 of the Esslingen locomotives were built by Smulders.

When the Second Boer War broke out, the Pretoria-Pietersburg rail line was expropriated from its British owners by the ZAR government and placed under the control of the NZASM. The PPS locomotives were all manufactured in the UK.

Year	Number	NZASM Number	Configuration	NZASM Type	SAR type	Force (kN)	Force (lbf)	Manufacturer
1890	3	6-8	0-4-0T	10-ton				Louis Smulders & Co.
1889	1		0-4-0T	13-ton		22.9	5,150	Maschinenfabrik Esslingen
1889	5	1-5	0-4-0T	14-ton		33.9	7,623	Maschinenfabrik Esslingen
1890	6	9-14	0-6-0ST	18-ton		31.8	7,140	Manning Wardle
1890-92	24	15-38	0-4-2T	19-ton		34.5	7,744	Maschinenfabrik Esslingen, Maschinenfabriek Breda
1896-97	3	ex-PPS	0-6-0ST	26-ton		44	9,800	Hawthorn, Leslie and Co.
1892-97	4	991-994	0-4-2RT	32-ton		120.8	27,154	Maschinenfabrik Esslingen
1887	1	ex-PPS	4-6-0T	35-ton		41.6	9,354	Nasmyth, Wilson & Company
1891-92	20	41-60	0-6-2T	40-ton		74.3	16,707	Maschinenfabrik Esslingen
1893-99	195	61-237	0-6-4T	46-ton	Class B	73.8	16,580	Maschinenfabrik Esslingen, Werkspoor NV
1897, 1900	6	ex-PPS	2-6-4T	55-ton	Class D	69.4	15,610	Beyer, Peacock and Company

== The South African War to the Present ==
In 1899 shortly after the outbreak of the South African War, also known as the Second Boer War (1899–1902), the government of the ZAR exercised its rights in accordance to the concession granted to the NZASM to place the company under government control. Towards the end of the war, the company, along with the rail company of the Orange Free State (OVSM), was placed under military control by the British, and in 1904 the NZASM and the OVSM were merged into the Central South African Railways.

After protracted negotiations, NZASM's shareholders and creditors were given some compensation for debts and losses incurred by the company being seized by the British. The NZASM was formally dissolved in 1908, and the final financial statements were presented to shareholders in 1909. The company also published a book, In Memoriam, about the history of the NZASM in 1910. The money from the company's liquidation was used to establish the Zuid-Afrikaansche Stichting Moederland (ZASM) in 1908. The ZASM is an organization dedicated to the advancement of cultural and economic ties between the Netherlands and South Africa. The ZASM also purchased a building in Amsterdam to house the organization's archives and collections, including a part of the NZASM's archives. This building is now used by a variety of organizations under the common banner Zuid-Afrikahuis (South Africa House).

A great deal of the NZASM's infrastructure including bridges, drains, houses, and stations still exists and in many cases is still owned and actively used by Transnet. Several of the NZASM locomotives have survived and now form part of the Outeniqua Transport Museum's collection.

In 1916, shortly after the establishment of the Union of South Africa, the Central South African Railways was merged with the railways of the former English Cape (Cape Government Railways) and Natal (Natal Government Railways) Colonies, resulting in the establishment of the South African Rail and Harbour Administration or Spoornet. In 1980, Spoornet was renamed to Transnet, and it was granted company status in 1990.

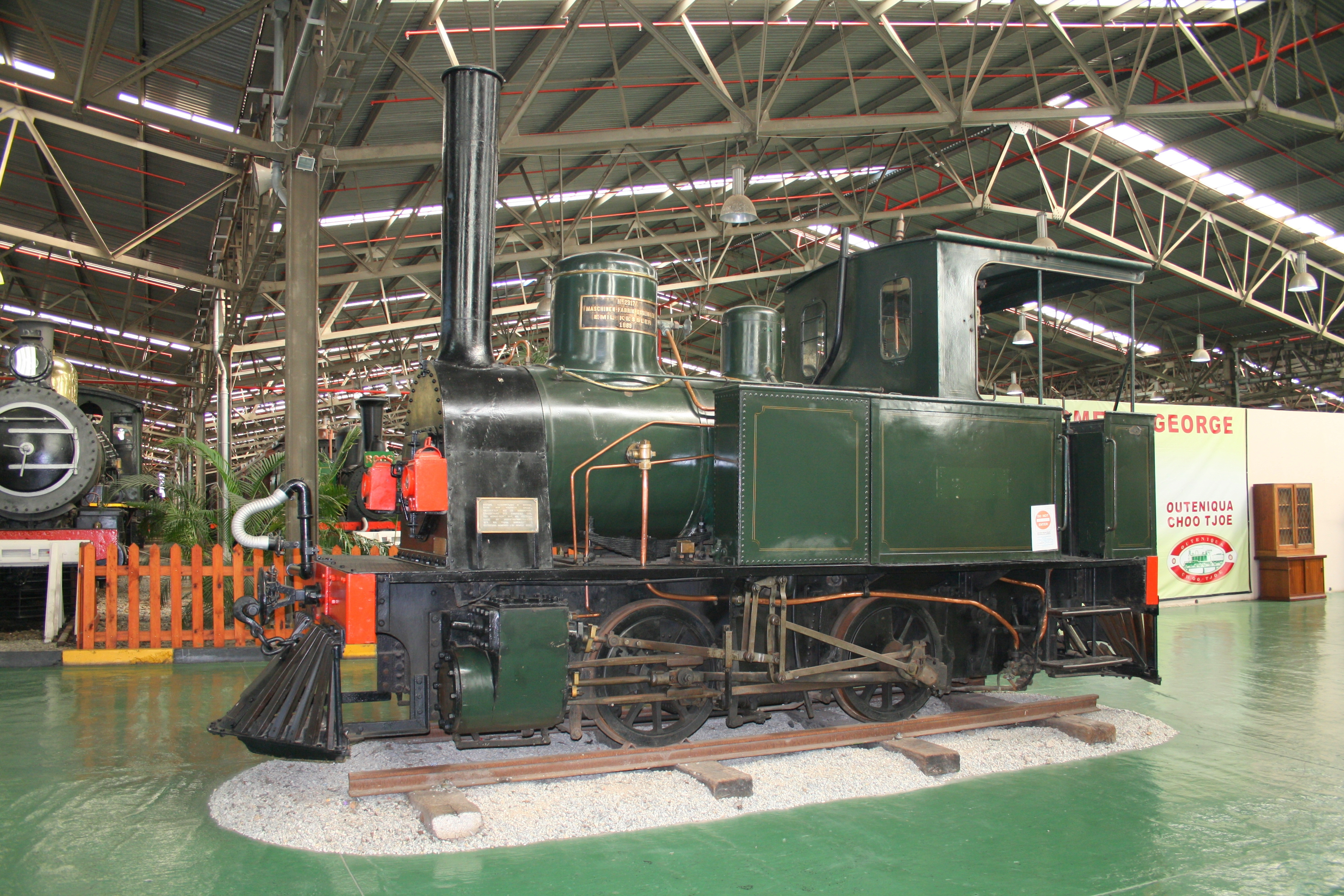
NZASM 14 Tonner 0-4-0T, no. 1 Transvaal at the Outeniqua Transport Museum.

The NZASM archives may be found in the South African National Archives in South Africa; the Dutch National Archives in the Netherlands; and in the archives of the Zuid-Afrikahuis and the Dutch Economic History Archive (NEHA), both in Amsterdam. The NZASM photos in the collection of the Zuid-Afrikahuis have also been digitized and may be viewed online. NZASM related archival material may also be found in various other archives, including The National Archives of the United Kingdom.

== See also ==
- History of rail transport in Mozambique
- List of NZASM locomotives
- Rail transport in South Africa
