= South African Class GH 4-6-2+2-6-4 =

1928 articulated steam locomotive

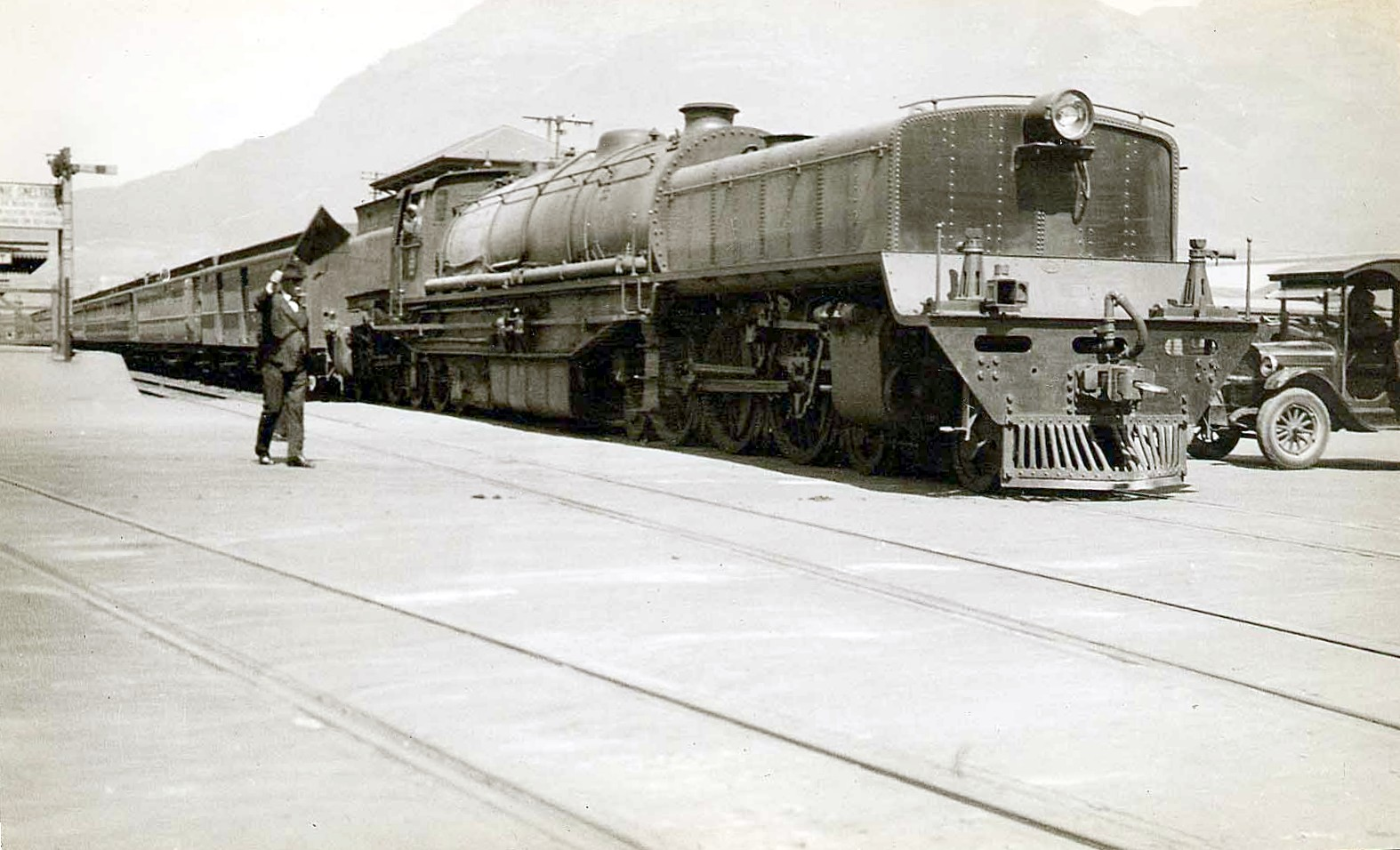
- No. 2320 at Monument Station, Cape Town, c. 1930
Type and origin
- Power type: Steam
- Designer: Maffei
- Builder: Maffei
- Serial number: 5687–5688
- Model: Class GH
- Build date: 1928
- Total produced: 2
Specifications
- Configuration
  - Whyte: 4-6-2+2-6-4 (Double Pacific)
  - UIC: 2'C1'+1'C2'h4t
- Driver: 2nd & 5th coupled axles
- Gauge: 3 ft 6 in (1,067 mm) Cape gauge
- Leading dia.: 30 in (762 mm)
- Coupled dia.: 60 in (1,524 mm)
- Trailing dia.: 30 in (762 mm)
- Wheelbase: 76 ft 7 in (23,343 mm)
  - Engine: 25 ft 2 in (7,671 mm) each
  - Leading: 6 ft 2 in (1,880 mm) each
  - Coupled: 10 ft 9 in (3,277 mm) each
- Pivot centres: 39 ft 6 1/2 in (12,052 mm)
- Length
  - Over couplers: 85 ft (25,908 mm)
- Height: 12 ft 11 7/16 in (3,948 mm)
- Frame type: Bar
- Axle load: 18 LT 2 cwt (18,390 kg)
  - Leading: 25 LT 12 cwt (26,010 kg) front 25 LT 14 cwt (26,110 kg) rear
  - 1st coupled: 18 LT 2 cwt (18,390 kg)
  - 2nd coupled: 18 LT (18,290 kg)
  - 3rd coupled: 18 LT 2 cwt (18,390 kg)
  - 4th coupled: 17 LT 16 cwt (18,090 kg)
  - 5th coupled: 17 LT 14 cwt (17,980 kg)
  - 6th coupled: 17 LT 16 cwt (18,090 kg)
  - Trailing: 13 LT 2 cwt (13,310 kg) front 12 LT 17 cwt (13,060 kg) rear
- Adhesive weight: 107 LT 10 cwt (109,200 kg)
- Loco weight: 184 LT 15 cwt (187,700 kg)
- Fuel type: Coal
- Fuel capacity: 13 LT 10 cwt (13.7 t)
- Water cap.: 3,650 imp gal (16,600 L) front 2,350 imp gal (10,700 L) belly
- Firebox
  - Type: Round-top
  - Grate area: 60 sq ft (5.6 m^{2})
- Boiler
  - Pitch: 8 ft 3 in (2,515 mm)
  - Diameter: 6 ft 11 in (2,108 mm)
  - Tube plates: 13 ft 8 in (4,166 mm)
  - Small tubes: 195: 2 1/4 in (57 mm)
  - Large tubes: 43: 5 1/2 in (140 mm)
- Boiler pressure: 180 psi (1,241 kPa)
- Safety valve: Pop
- Heating surface
  - Firebox: 214 sq ft (19.9 m^{2})
  - Tubes: 2,416 sq ft (224.5 m^{2})
  - Arch tubes: 25 sq ft (2.3 m^{2})
  - Total surface: 2,655 sq ft (246.7 m^{2})
- Superheater
  - Heating area: 665 sq ft (61.8 m^{2})
- Cylinders: Four
- Cylinder size: 19 1/2 in (495 mm) bore 26 in (660 mm) stroke
- Valve gear: Heusinger
- Valve type: Piston
- Couplers: AAR knuckle
Performance figures
- Tractive effort: 44,490 lbf (197.9 kN) @ 75%
Career
- Operators: South African Railways
- Class: Class GH
- Number in class: 2
- Numbers: 2320–2321
- Delivered: 1928
- First run: 1928
- Withdrawn: c. 1958

The South African Railways Class GH 4-6-2+2-6-4 of 1928 was an articulated steam locomotive.

In 1928, the South African Railways placed two Class GH 4-6-2+2-6-4 Double Pacific type passenger versions of the Class U Union Garratt articulated steam locomotive in service. The Union Garratt design embodied the Garratt design at the front end and the Modified Fairlie design at the rear end.

== Manufacturer ==
The Class GH, the heavy passenger version of the Class U Union Garratt, was designed and built by Maffei in Munich, Germany, to the specifications of Colonel F.R. Collins DSO, Chief Mechanical Engineer of the South African Railways (SAR). Two locomotives were delivered in 1928, numbered 2320 and 2321. They were erected at the Salt River shops in Cape Town.

If the same classification practice as that which was used for Garratt and Mallet locomotives had been followed, the Classes GH and U Union Garratts should have been designated Class UA and Class UB respectively. During the design phase of the two Union Garratt types, they were designated classification letters in the regular SAR Garratt range as Classes GH and GJ respectively. When orders were placed with the manufacturers, however, the Class designation of the Class GH was retained while that of the Class GJ Double Prairie type was changed to Class U. The reasoning behind this inconsistency is not known.

== Characteristics ==
The locomotives were superheated and had round-topped fireboxes, bar frames, Walschaerts valve gear and Z-ported cylinders with short-lap, short-travel valves. The design of the two Union Garratt types deviated from the Garratt principle, the patent of which was held by Beyer, Peacock & Company, and the end results were hybrid locomotives, part Garratt and part Modified Fairlie. The front end of the locomotive was of a typical Garratt arrangement with a water tank mounted on the front engine unit's frame, while the rear end was constructed in the Modified Fairlie fashion with the coal bunker mounted on a rigid extension of the locomotive's main frame and with the pivoting rear engine unit positioned beneath the coal bunker.

Since the rear bunker carried only coal, an additional large underbelly water tank under the boiler compensated for the resulting diminished water capacity. All the engine's water was carried in the front bunker tank and in the underbelly water tank, with a combined capacity of 6,000 imperial gallons (27,000 litres), while the rear bunker had a coal capacity of 13 long tons 10 hundredweight (13.7 tonnes). The main frame therefore carried the smokebox, boiler, firebox, cab, coal bunker, as well as the underbelly water tank.

The Class GH were massive and powerful locomotives and, having been designed for passenger service, were built for speed with their large 60 inches (1,524 millimetres) diameter coupled wheels. With their 60 square feet (5.6 square metres) firegrates, they were equipped with mechanical stokers of the duplex type. One reason which was put forward for the construction of the rear end of the Union Garratts on the Modified Fairlie principle was to enable their coal bunkers to be rigidly in line with their boiler frames to ensure a satisfactory arrangement for the installation of mechanical stokers. The subsequent designs of the Classes GL and GM Garratts showed that this precaution was unnecessary.

== Shortcomings ==
The Modified Fairlies and the Union Garratt variations of it were not successful in South Africa and they suffered from the same shortcomings.

On the Union Garratts, as on the Modified Fairlies, the frames were prone to metal fatigue and cracking, brought about by the long frame overhang at the rear beyond the engine unit pivot centre. The overhang, laden with the coal bunker which extended completely beyond the rear engine unit's pivot centre was subjected to severe vertical oscillation while the locomotive was in motion and this led to structural weakening of the frame over time.

In addition, since the coal bunker was mounted on the frame instead of on the engine unit, the rear pivot bearings were subject to quite rapid wear since they carried a considerable additional vertical load compared to those on a purebred Garratt. As was the case with the Modified Fairlies, this resulted in increased frequency of maintenance and as a consequence, increased operating cost.

== Service ==
The Class GH was acquired for working the named fast passenger trains of the era, the Union Express and Union Limited, and was initially shedded in Cape Town. The service career of the Class GH had a rough start, however, since on the first trip it was discovered that it exceeded the loading gauge in width. It returned to Salt River minus its steps and sundry fittings after having scraped the platforms of every station along its route. Considerable modifications had to be carried out before the two locomotives could be placed back in regular service.

The Class GH made several trips working the Union Express out of Cape Town and was capable of taking the train up Hex River Railpass without a banker, but they were not as successful as had been hoped and they were soon taken off that duty. Their mechanical stokers also proved to be troublesome and were eventually removed. They were transferred to Natal and worked on the Natal mainline north of Glencoe for the rest of their service lives. Both were withdrawn from service by 1958.

== Illustration ==
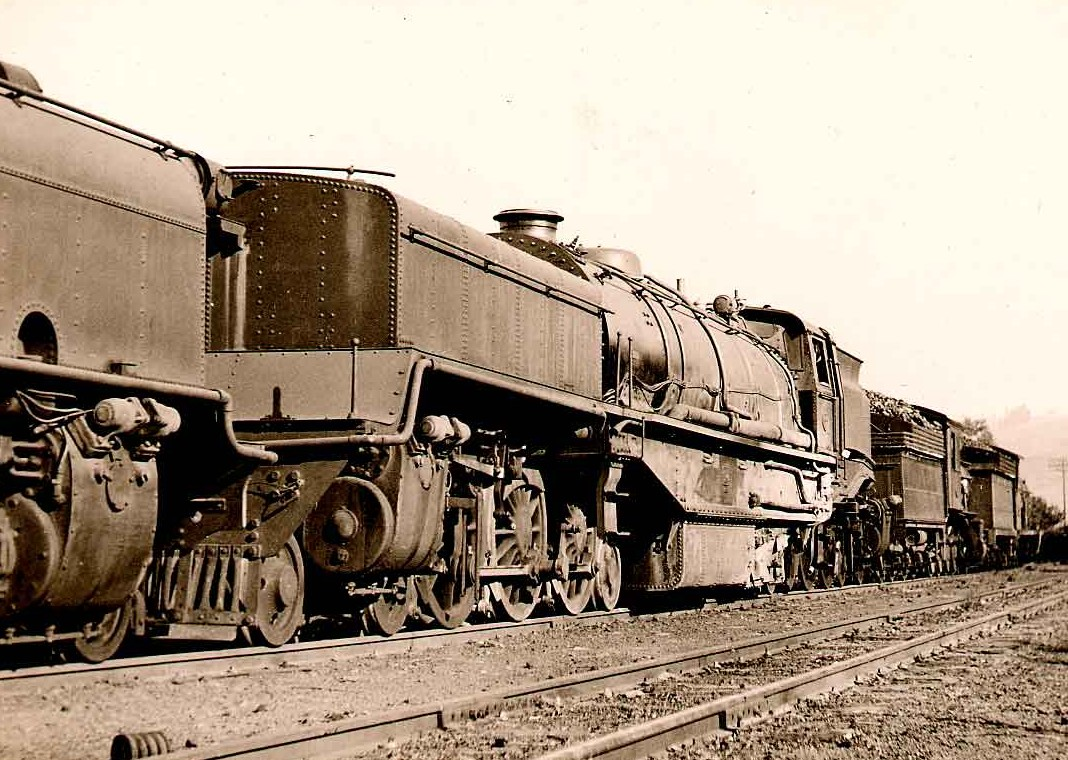
Class GH Union Garratt staged at Glencoe, Natal, c. 1950
