= Nquthu =

- Location within KwaZulu-Natal Location within South Africa
- Coordinates: 28.232°S 30.566°E
- Country: South Africa
- Province: KwaZulu-Natal
- District: Umzinyathi
- Municipality: Nqutu

Area
  - Total: 5.31 km^{2} (2.05 sq mi)

Population (2011)
  - Total: 170 307
  - Density: 32/km^{2} (83/sq mi)

Racial makeup (2011)
  - Black African: 97.9%
  - Coloured: 0.3%
  - Indian/Asian: 0.2%
  - White: 0.2%
  - Other: 1.4%

First languages (2011)
  - Zulu: 91.5%
  - Sotho: 1.6%
  - English: 1.6%
  - Other: 5.2%
- Time zone: UTC+2 (SAST)

Nquthu is a town in Umzinyathi District Municipality in the KwaZulu-Natal province of South Africa.

The village is 24 km west-south-west of Barklieside and 53 km east of Dundee, KwaZulu-Natal. Of Zulu origin, the name is derived from isquthu, which translates to 'flat-topped vessel', descriptive of a nearby hill from which the village takes its name.

== Education ==
Primary

- Ntanyandlovu Primary School
- Maduladula Combined Primary School
- Isibuko Sabasha Primary School
- Mafitleng Primary School
- Dalala Primary School
- Monte Casino Primary
- Ngwebini Primary School
- Qediphika Primary School
- Isandlwana Primary School

Secondary

- Ubongumenzi Secondary School
- Siyanda High School
- Hlubi High School
- Nomdumo High School
- Maceba Secondary School
- Sihayo High School
- Mgazi High School
- Ekucabangeni Secondary School
- Nhlalakahle Secondary School
- Zicole Senior Secondary School
- Gadeleni Secondary School
- Phakathwayo Secondary School
- Zindlalele Secondary School

Combined School

- Life Changing & Christian School

Higher institutions of learning

- Mthashana TVET College
