= Wasbank =

- Location within KwaZulu-Natal Location within South Africa
- Coordinates: 28°18′50″S 30°6′26″E
- Country: South Africa
- Province: KwaZulu-Natal
- District: Umzinyathi
- Municipality: Endumeni

Area
  - Total: 10.05 km^{2} (3.88 sq mi)

Population (2011)
  - Total: 1,323
  - Density: 131.6/km^{2} (341.0/sq mi)

Racial makeup (2011)
  - Black African: 88.5%
  - Coloured: 2.4%
  - Indian/Asian: 7.9%
  - Other: 1.1%

First languages (2011)
  - Zulu: 86.8%
  - English: 11.3%
  - Other: 1.8%
- Time zone: UTC+2 (SAST)
- PO box: 2920
- Area code: 034

Wasbank is a town in Umzinyathi District Municipality in the KwaZulu-Natal province of South Africa.

Village on the Wasbank River, 25 km (16 mi) southwest of Dundee. Takes its name from the Wasbank River.
