= 4-6-2+2-6-4 =

Locomotive wheel arrangement

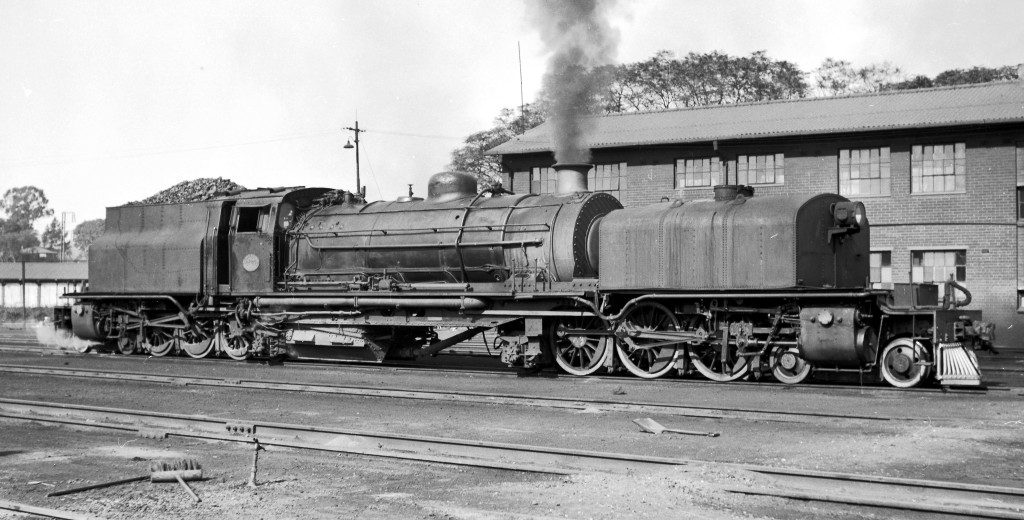
- SAR Class GF, the first 4-6-2+2-6-4 Double Pacific
Equivalent classifications
- UIC class: 2C1+1C2
- French class: 231+132
- Turkish class: 36+36
- Swiss class: 3/6+3/6, 6/12 from 1920s
- Russian class: 2-3-1+1-3-2
First known tank engine version
- First use: 1927
- Country: South Africa
- Locomotive: Class GF
- Railway: South African Railways
- Designer: South African Railways
- Builder: Hanomag
- Evolved from: 2-6-2+2-6-2

Under the Whyte notation for the classification of steam locomotives by wheel arrangement, a 4-6-2+2-6-4 is a Garratt or Union Garratt articulated locomotive using a pair of 4-6-2 engine units back to back, with the boiler and cab suspended between them. The 4-6-2 wheel arrangement of each engine unit has four leading wheels, six powered and coupled driving wheels, and two trailing wheels.

== Overview ==
=== Garratt ===
The Double Pacific type was fairly common for Garratt locomotives, especially those intended for faster passenger service. The first of the type was the Class GF, built by Hanomag for the South African Railways in 1927. The first to be built by Beyer, Peacock & Company, the owner of the Garratt patent, was the G class for the New Zealand Railways Department in 1928. Beyer, Peacock & Company also built the last Double Pacific in 1943, for the Nigerian Railways.

=== Union Garratt ===
The South African Railways also operated a Double Pacific version of the Union Garratt articulated locomotive. The Union Garratt was a hybrid locomotive, partly Modified Fairlie and partly Garratt. The front end was of a typical Garratt arrangement, with a water tank mounted on the front engine unit’s frame, while the rear end was constructed in the Modified Fairlie fashion, with the coal bunker mounted on a rigid extension of the locomotive’s main frame and with the pivoting rear engine unit positioned beneath the coal bunker. It had an additional large underbelly water tank under the boiler. The main frame therefore carried the smokebox, boiler, firebox, cab, coal bunker, as well as the underbelly water tank. As a result, like the Modified Fairlies, the Union Garratts were prone to metal fatigue and cracking of the frames. In the case of the Union Garratts, this occurred particularly at the rear, brought about by the long frame overhang laden with the coal bunker.

4-6-2+2-6-4 Garratt production list – All manufacturers
Gauge	Railway	Class	Works no.	Units	Year	Builder
3 ft	Ferrocarril Dorada, Colombia		6843-6844	2	1938	Beyer, Peacock & Company
1,000 mm	Midland of Buenos Aires, Argentina		6570-6571	2	1929	Beyer, Peacock & Company
1,000 mm	Leopoldina Railway, Brazil		6572-6573	2	1929	Beyer, Peacock & Company
1,000 mm	Leopoldina Railway, Brazil		6845-6850	6	1937	Beyer, Peacock & Company
1,000 mm	Leopoldina Railway, Brazil		7026-7033	8	1943	Beyer, Peacock & Company
1,000 mm	Vicoa Ferrea do Rio Grande do Sul, Brazil		22047-22056	10	1931	Henschel & Son
3 ft 6 in	New Zealand Railways	G	6484-6486	3	1928	Beyer, Peacock & Company
3 ft 6 in	Nigerian Railways		6781-6784	4	1935	Beyer, Peacock & Company
3 ft 6 in	Nigerian Railways		6796-6797	2	1936	Beyer, Peacock & Company
3 ft 6 in	Nigerian Railways		6861-6866	6	1937	Beyer, Peacock & Company
3 ft 6 in	Nigerian Railways		6927-6930	4	1939	Beyer, Peacock & Company
3 ft 6 in	Nigerian Railways		7051-7056	6	1943	Beyer, Peacock & Company
3 ft 6 in	South African Railways	GF	10512-10548	37	1927	Hanomag
3 ft 6 in	South African Railways	GF	21053-21070	18	1928	Henschel & Son
3 ft 6 in	South African Railways	GF	5748-5757	10	1928	Maffei
4 ft 8 1/2 in	PLM, Algeria	231-132.AT	2678	1	1932	Société Franco-Belge, France
4 ft 8 1/2 in	C.F.Algeria	231-132.BT	2697-2708	12	1936	Société Franco-Belge, France
4 ft 8 1/2 in	C.F.Algeria	231-132.BT	2711-2714	4	1937	Société Franco-Belge, France
4 ft 8 1/2 in	C.F.Algeria	231-132.BT	2725-2730	6	1939	Société Franco-Belge, France
4 ft 8 1/2 in	C.F.Algeria	231-132.BT	2741-2747	7	1940	Société Franco-Belge, France
5 ft 6 in	Central of Aragon, Spain		191-196	6	1931	Euskalduna, Bilbao

== Use ==
=== Algeria ===
231+132BT Class

Twenty-nine 4-6-2+2-6-4 Garratts, constructed between 1936 and 1941 by Société Franco-Belge in Northern France, operated until the Algerian independence war caused their withdrawal in 1951. This class, designated 231-132BT, was streamlined and featured Cossart motion gear, mechanical stokers and 1.8 m (5 ft 11 in) driving wheels, the largest of any Garratt class. On a test in France, one of these achieved a speed of 132 kilometres per hour (82 mph)—a record for any Garratt class (and indeed any articulated class).

=== Mozambique ===
In the late 1960s, four South African Class GF 4-6-2+2-6-4 Garratt locomotives were sold to the Mozambique Ports & Railways, where they became the Series 911.

=== New Zealand ===
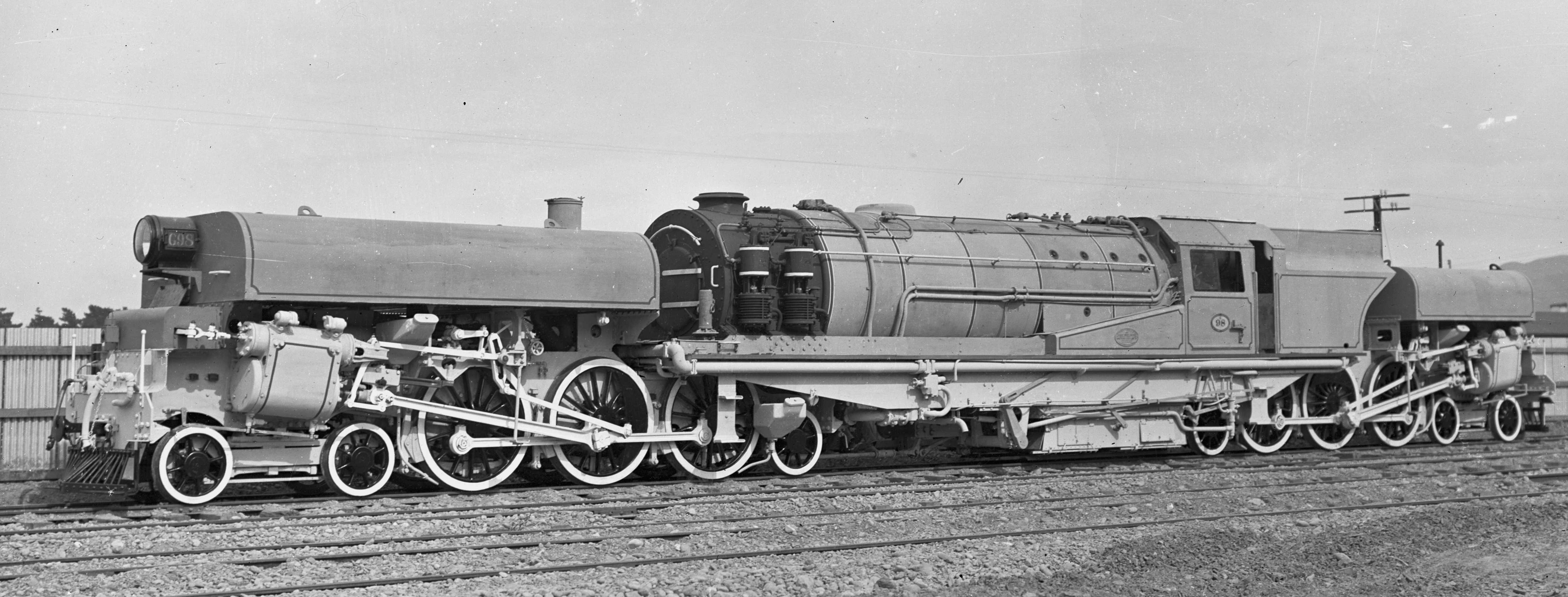
NZR G class

Three six-cylinder G class Garratt locomotives were built for the New Zealand Railways Department (NZR) by Beyer, Peacock & Company in 1928. They were the only six-cylinder simplex Garratts ever used in New Zealand and used Walschaerts valve gear to operate the outside cylinders, while Gresley conjugated valve gear operated the inner third cylinders. The locomotive was equipped with a mechanical stoker and was of an unusual design, with the coal bunker mounted on an extension to the main frame behind the cab instead of being mounted as a coal-and-water bunker on the rear engine unit’s frame, as was the usual practice on Garratt locomotives. Unlike a Union Garratt, however, the rear water tank was still mounted on the rear engine unit.

The Garratts were acquired in response to traffic growth over the heavy grades of the North Island Main Trunk and to eliminate the use of banking locomotives on steep gradients. However, since they proved to be unsuccessful and problem-ridden in service, they were withdrawn in 1937 and rebuilt to six three-cylinder 4-6-2 locomotives by the NZR’s Hillside Workshops.

=== South Africa ===
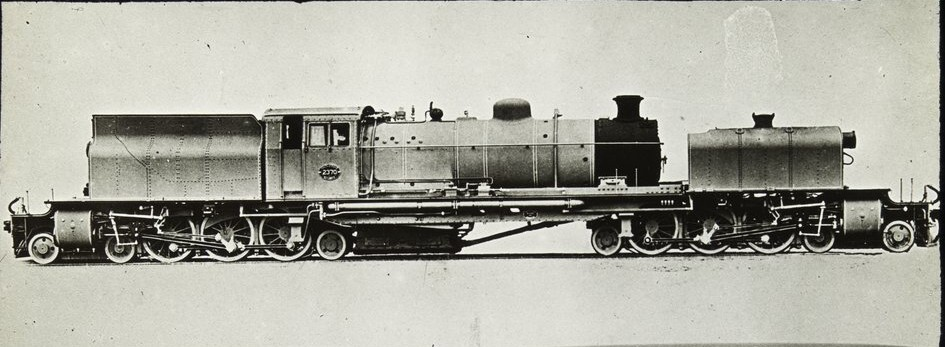
SAR Class GF

In 1927, the South African Railways (SAR) placed 37 Class GF Garratt locomotives in service. They were the first of the 4-6-2+2-6-4 type and were built by Hanomag in Germany. The locomotive specifications were prepared by Colonel F.R. Collins, Chief Mechanical Engineer of the SAR from 1922 to 1929, who designed it as a mixed traffic locomotive for use on branch lines and secondary mainlines throughout the country.

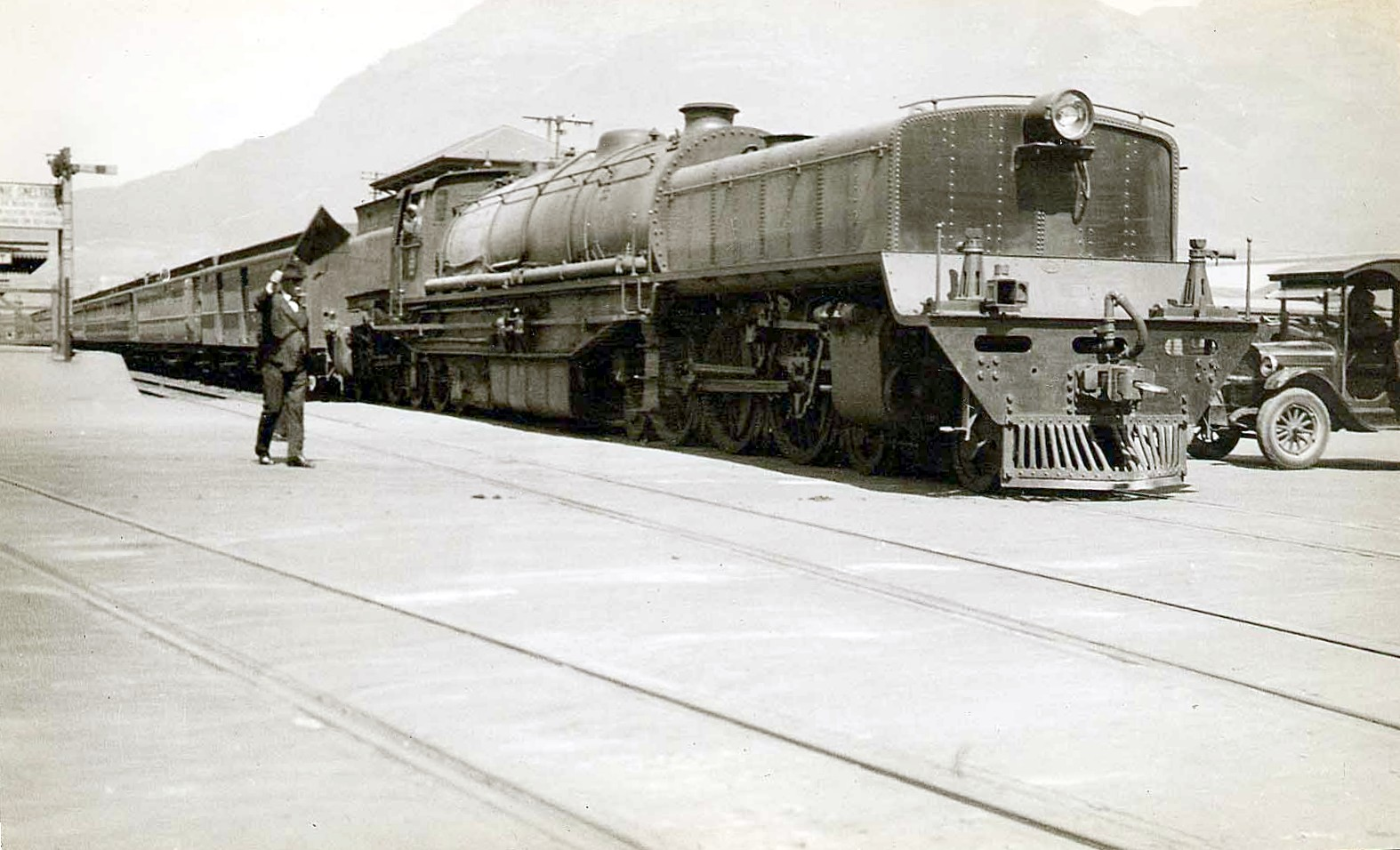
Class GH Union Garratt, c. 1930

A second order was placed with Henschel & Son for eighteen locomotives which were delivered in 1928. These were followed by a third order, placed with Maffei in 1928, for a final batch of ten locomotives which were delivered in that same year. They were superheated, had bar frames and used Walschaerts valve gear. Its good turn of speed and reasonably high tractive effort made the Class GF Double Pacific a good utility locomotive and, with 65 units, the class was the most numerous Garratt type in SAR service until the arrival of the Class GMA and Class GMAM in 1954.

In 1928, the SAR placed two Class GH passenger train versions of its Class U Union Garratt in service, designed and built by Maffei, to work the named fast passenger trains of the era, the Union Express and Union Limited, forerunners of the Blue Train. They were superheated and had Walschaerts valve gear, bar frames and mechanical stokers. They made several trips working the two Union trains out of Cape Town, but they were not as successful as had been hoped and they were soon taken off that duty. Their mechanical stokers also proved to be troublesome and were eventually removed. Both remained in service until 1958.

=== Spain ===
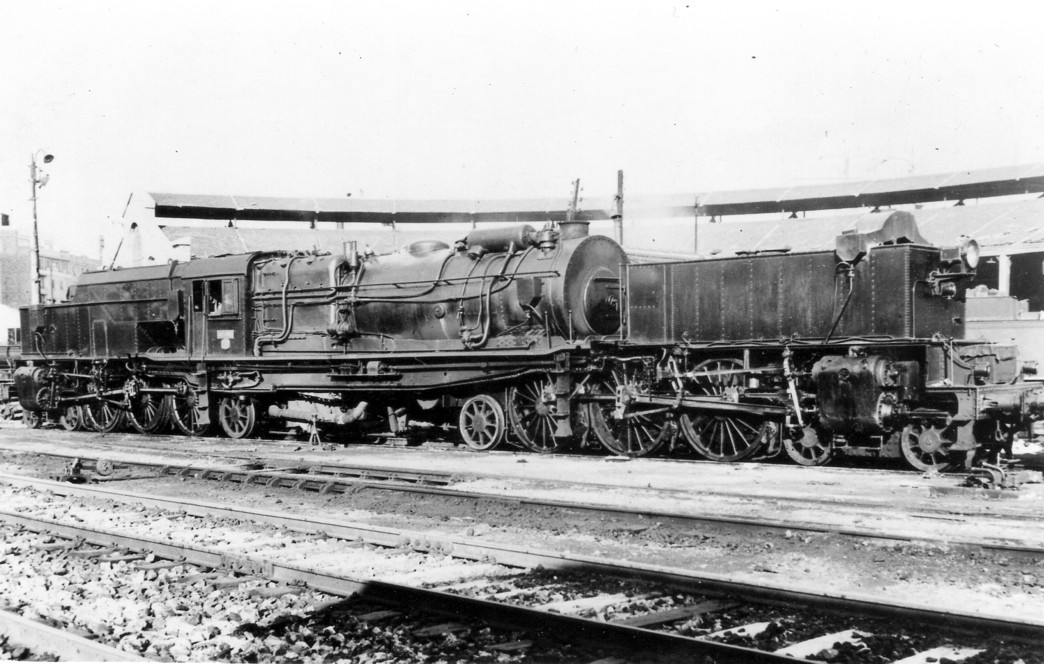
Spanish Serie 462-0400

Six Garratt locomotives of this wheel arrangement, built by Euskalduna in 1931, were used on the 5 ft 6 in (1,676 mm) gauge Ferrocarril Central de Aragón (FCA) in Spain. They worked the heaviest passenger trains on the steepest gradients from Valencia to Zaragoza.

After the FCA was integrated into RENFE in 1941, the locomotives were converted to oil-burners and worked in the Tarragona-Valencia section on the line between Barcelona and Seville, until they were replaced by diesel traction in 1967 and retired.
