= Nquthu Local Municipality =

Coordinates: 28°12′38″S 30°40′36″E

Nquthu
- Local municipality
- Seal

- Location in KwaZulu-Natal
- Country: South Africa
- Province: KwaZulu-Natal
- District: uMzinyathi
- Seat: Nquthu
- Wards: 20

Government
  - Type: Municipal council

Area
  - Total: 1,962 km^{2} (758 sq mi)

Population (2011)
  - Total: 165,307
  - Density: 84.25/km^{2} (218.2/sq mi)

Racial makeup (2011)
  - Black African: 99.7%
  - Coloured: 0.1%
  - Indian/Asian: 0.1%
  - White: 0.1%

First languages (2011)
  - Zulu: 90.1%
  - Sotho: 6.6%
  - Other: 3.3%
- Time zone: UTC+2 (SAST)
- Municipal code: KZN242

Nquthu Municipality (Zulu: UMasipala wase Nquthu) is a local municipality within the Umzinyathi District Municipality, in the KwaZulu-Natal province of South Africa. Nquthu is an isiZulu word meaning "the back of the head".

Isandlwana is the site of a historic Anglo-Zulu War battle that took place on 22 January 1879, and is a well known tourist destination worldwide.

== Main places ==
The 2001 census divided the municipality into the following main places:

Place	Code	Area (km^{2})	Population
Buthanani	52001	88.20	9,050
Emandleni	52002	250.76	8,877
Godide	52003	46.00	2,191
Hlatshwayo	52004	49.50	5,135
Khiphinkunzi	52005	168.71	26,233
Mangidini	52006	39.48	2,963
Mbokodwebomvu	52007	81.09	6,083
Molefe	52008	547.55	61,029
Nondweni	52009	7.61	7,173
Nquthu	52010	40.69	8,113
Vulindlela	52011	94.34	4,335
Zondi	52012	40.03	3,834

== Politics ==
The municipal council consists of thirty-nine members elected by mixed-member proportional representation. Twenty councillors are elected by first-past-the-post voting in seventeen wards, while the remaining sixteen are chosen from party lists so twenty the total number of party representatives is proportional to the number of votes received.

In the election of 4 November 2026, the Inkatha Freedom Party lost its majority, but remains the largest party in the council, with 17 seats.

The following table shows the results of the 2026 election.

Party	Ward			List			Total seats
Party	Votes	%	Seats	Votes	%	Seats	Total seats
Inkatha Freedom Party	18,437	42.09	14	18,419	42.04	3	17
uMkhonto weSizwe Party	12,256	27.98	4	12,706	29.00	7	11
African National Congress	9,421	21.51	2	9,150	20.88	6	8
Abantu Bezwelethu Congress Democracy	1,282	2.93	0	1,165	2.66	1	1
South African Communist Party	839	1.92	0	818	1.87	1	1
Democratic Alliance	441	1.01	0	521	1.19	1	1
Independent candidates	202	0.46	0				0
10 other parties	930	2.12	0	1,039	2.37	0	0
Total	43,808	100.00	20	43,818	100.00	19	39
Valid votes	43,808	98.46		43,818	98.60		
Invalid/blank votes	687	1.54		622	1.40		
Total votes	44,495	100.00		44,440	100.00		
Registered voters/turnout	88,443	50.31		88,443	50.25		
