= Barklieside =

- Location within KwaZulu-Natal Location within South Africa
- Coordinates: 28.159°S 30.881°E
- Country: South Africa
- Province: KwaZulu-Natal
- District: uMzinyathi
- Municipality: Nquthu

Area
  - Total: 2.13 km^{2} (0.82 sq mi)

Population (2011)
  - Total: 535
  - Density: 251/km^{2} (651/sq mi)

Racial makeup (2011)
  - Black African: 100.0%

First languages (2011)
  - Zulu: 95.9%
  - S. Ndebele: 3.7%
  - Other: 0.4%
- Time zone: UTC+2 (SAST)

Barklieside is a town in Umzinyathi District Municipality in the KwaZulu-Natal province of South Africa.
