= Endumeni Local Municipality =

Coordinates: 28°10′09″S 30°13′37″E

Endumeni
- Local municipality
- Seal

- Location in KwaZulu-Natal
- Country: South Africa
- Province: KwaZulu-Natal
- District: uMzinyathi
- Seat: Dundee
- Wards: 8

Government
  - Type: Municipal council

Area
  - Total: 1,610 km^{2} (620 sq mi)

Population (2011)
  - Total: 64,862
  - Density: 40.3/km^{2} (104/sq mi)

Racial makeup (2011)
  - Black African: 83.9%
  - Coloured: 2.6%
  - Indian/Asian: 5.9%
  - White: 7.2%

First languages (2011)
  - Zulu: 79.1%
  - English: 12.2%
  - Afrikaans: 5.3%
  - Other: 3.4%
- Time zone: UTC+2 (SAST)
- Municipal code: KZN241

Endumeni Municipality (Zulu: UMasipala wase Endumeni) is a local municipality within the Umzinyathi District Municipality, in the KwaZulu-Natal province of South Africa. Endumeni is an isiZulu word meaning "a place of thunderstorm". The municipality shares its name with the Endumeni hill.

== Main places ==
The 2001 census divided the municipality into the following main places:

Place	Code	Area (km^{2})	Population
Dundee	51901	46.60	12,268
eSbongile	51903	0.06	370
eSibongile	51904	1.33	8,074
Glencoe	51905	25.23	6,116
Sbongile	51906	1.20	7,328
Sithembile	51907	1.42	7,953
Wasbank	51908	6.29	1,123
Remainder of the municipality	51902	1,530.06	7,859

== Politics ==
The municipal council consists of fifteen members elected by mixed-member proportional representation. Eight councillors are elected by first-past-the-post voting in eight wards, while the remaining seven are chosen from party lists so that the total number of party representatives is proportional to the number of votes received.

In the election of 4 November 2026, no party gained a majority, with the uMkhonto weSizwe Party winning the largest number of seats on the council, five.

The following table shows the results of the election.

Party	Ward			List			Total seats
Party	Votes	%	Seats	Votes	%	Seats	Total seats
uMkhonto weSizwe Party	6,081	31.81	5	6,364	33.29	0	5
Inkatha Freedom Party	4,726	24.73	1	4,670	24.43	3	4
Democratic Alliance	2,881	15.07	2	3,157	16.52	0	2
African National Congress	2,504	13.10	0	2,506	13.11	2	2
South African Communist Party	1,054	5.51	0	990	5.18	1	1
Freedom Front Plus	992	5.19	0	1,016	5.32	1	1
Independent candidates	431	2.25	0				0
8 other parties	445	2.33	0	412	2.16	0	0
Total	19,114	100.00	8	19,115	100.00	7	15
Valid votes	19,114	99.12		19,115	99.02		
Invalid/blank votes	169	0.88		190	0.98		
Total votes	19,283	100.00		19,305	100.00		
Registered voters/turnout	35,924	53.68		35,924	53.74		
