= South African Class GF 4-6-2+2-6-4 =

1927 articulated steam locomotive

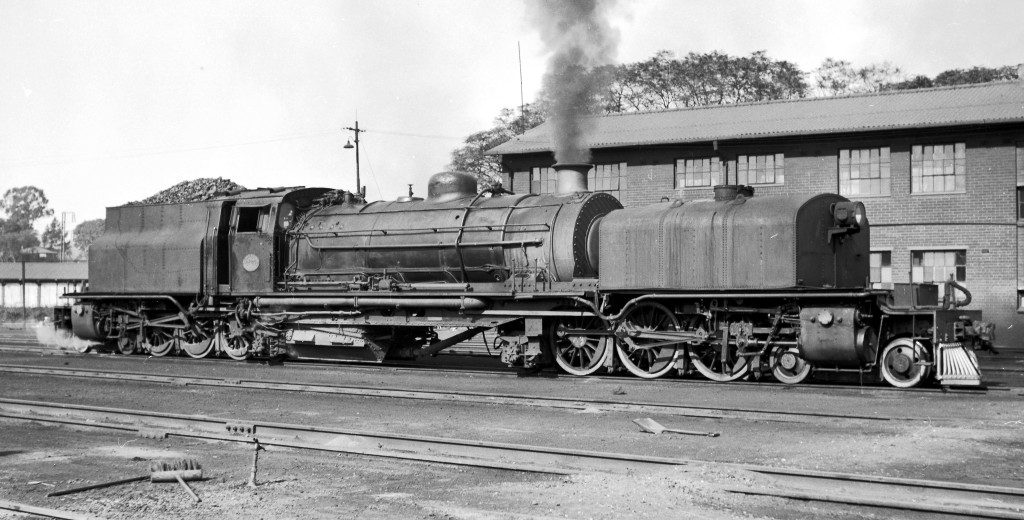
- No. 2427 at Mason's Mill, 6 July 1962
Type and origin
- ♠ Locomotives built by Hanomag ♥ Locomotives built by Henschel & Maffei
- Power type: Steam
- Designer: South African Railways (Col F.R. Collins DSO)
- Builder: Hanomag; Henschel and Son; Maffei
- Serial number: Hanomag 10512-10548; Henschel 21053-21070; Maffei 5748-5757
- Model: Class GF
- Build date: 1927–1928
- Total produced: 65
Specifications
- Configuration
  - Whyte: 4-6-2+2-6-4 (Double Pacific)
  - UIC: 2'C1'+1'C2'h4t
- Driver: 2nd & 5th coupled axles
- Gauge: 3 ft 6 in (1,067 mm) Cape gauge
- Leading dia.: 30 in (762 mm)
- Coupled dia.: 54 in (1,372 mm)
- Trailing dia.: 30 in (762 mm)
- Wheelbase: 69 ft 9 in (21,260 mm)
  - Engine: 23 ft 7 in (7,188 mm) each
  - Leading: 6 ft 2 in (1,880 mm) each
  - Coupled: 9 ft 6 in (2,896 mm) each
- Pivot centres: 33 ft 2 in (10,109 mm)
- Length
  - Over couplers: 77 ft 1 in (23,495 mm)
- Height: 12 ft 10 in (3,912 mm)
- Frame type: Bar
- Axle load: ♠ 14 LT (14,220 kg) ♥ 14 LT 4 cwt (14,430 kg)
  - Leading: ♠ 18 LT 1 cwt (18,340 kg) front 19 LT 3 cwt (19,460 kg) rear ♥ 17 LT 7 cwt (17,630 kg) front 19 LT 3 cwt (19,460 kg) rear
  - 1st coupled: ♠ 13 LT 13 cwt (13,870 kg) ♥ 13 LT 19 cwt (14,170 kg)
  - 2nd coupled: ♠ 13 LT 9 cwt (13,670 kg) ♥ 13 LT 15 cwt (13,970 kg)
  - 3rd coupled: ♠ 13 LT 13 cwt (13,870 kg) ♥ 13 LT 19 cwt (14,170 kg)
  - 4th coupled: ♠ 13 LT 19 cwt (14,170 kg) ♥ 14 LT 4 cwt (14,430 kg)
  - 5th coupled: ♠ 13 LT 16 cwt (14,020 kg) ♥ 13 LT 19 cwt (14,170 kg)
  - 6th coupled: ♠ 14 LT (14,220 kg) ♥ 14 LT 4 cwt (14,430 kg)
  - Trailing: ♠ 11 LT 7 cwt (11,530 kg) front 12 LT 4 cwt (12,400 kg) rear ♥ 12 LT 3 cwt (12,340 kg) front 12 LT 8 cwt (12,600 kg) rear
- Adhesive weight: ♠ 82 LT 10 cwt (83,820 kg) ♥ 84 LT (85,350 kg)
- Loco weight: ♠ 143 LT 5 cwt (145,500 kg) ♥ 145 LT 11 cwt (147,900 kg)
- Fuel type: Coal
- Fuel capacity: 10 LT (10.2 t) (light rail); 11 LT 10 cwt (11.7 t) (Johannesburg-Mafeking)
- Water cap.: 3,000 imp gal (13,600 L) front 1,000 imp gal (4,550 L) rear
- Firebox
  - Type: Round-top
  - Grate area: 44 sq ft (4.1 m^{2})
- Boiler
  - Pitch: 7 ft 9 in (2,362 mm)
  - Diameter: 6 ft 2 3/4 in (1,899 mm)
  - Tube plates: 11 ft 8 5/8 in (3,572 mm)
  - Small tubes: 234: 2 in (51 mm)
  - Large tubes: 36: 5 1/2 in (140 mm)
- Boiler pressure: 185 psi (1,276 kPa)
- Safety valve: Pop
- Heating surface
  - Firebox: 176 sq ft (16.4 m^{2})
  - Tubes: 2,043 sq ft (189.8 m^{2})
  - Arch tubes: 23 sq ft (2.1 m^{2})
  - Total surface: 2,242 sq ft (208.3 m^{2})
- Superheater
  - Heating area: 473 sq ft (43.9 m^{2})
- Cylinders: Four
- Cylinder size: 16 in (406 mm) bore 26 in (660 mm) stroke
- Valve gear: Heusinger
- Valve type: Piston
- Couplers: AAR knuckle
Performance figures
- Tractive effort: 34,200 lbf (152 kN) @ 75%
Career
- Operators: South African Railways
- Class: Class GF
- Number in class: 65
- Numbers: 2370–2434
- Delivered: 1927–1928
- First run: 1927
- Withdrawn: 1979

The South African Railways Class GF 4-6-2+2-6-4 of 1927 was an articulated steam locomotive.

In 1927, the South African Railways placed 37 Class GF Garratt steam locomotives with a 4-6-2+2-6-4 Double Pacific type wheel arrangement in service. A further 28 locomotives were delivered from two manufacturers in 1928.

== Manufacturers ==
During the term of office of Colonel F.R. Collins DSO as Chief Mechanical Engineer of the South African Railways (SAR) from 1922 to 1929, articulated locomotives were in great favour in South Africa, to the extent that the Railway Board of the day instructed that non-articulated engines should only be ordered in exceptional circumstances.

The specifications for the Class GF 4-6-2+2-6-4 Garratt locomotive were prepared by Colonel Collins and an order for 37 locomotives was placed with Hannoversche Maschinenbau AG (Hanomag) in Germany. They were delivered in December 1927 and numbered in the range from 2370 to 2406.

A second order for eighteen locomotives was placed with Henschel and Son in 1927. They were delivered in October 1928, numbered in the range from 2407 to 2424.

This was followed by a third order, placed with Maffei in 1928, for a final batch of ten locomotives. They were delivered in November of that same year and numbered in the range from 2425 to 2434.

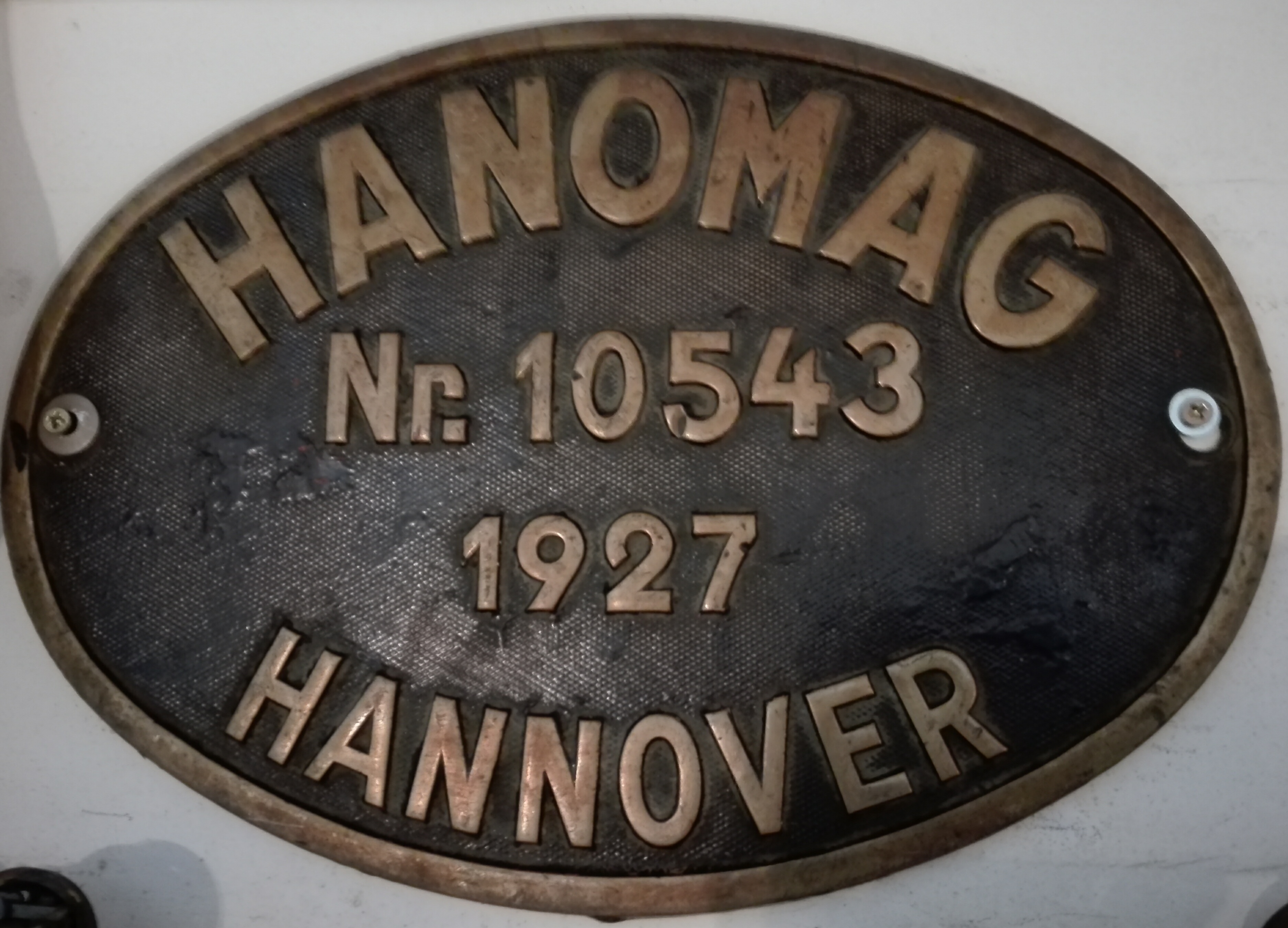
Gf 2401

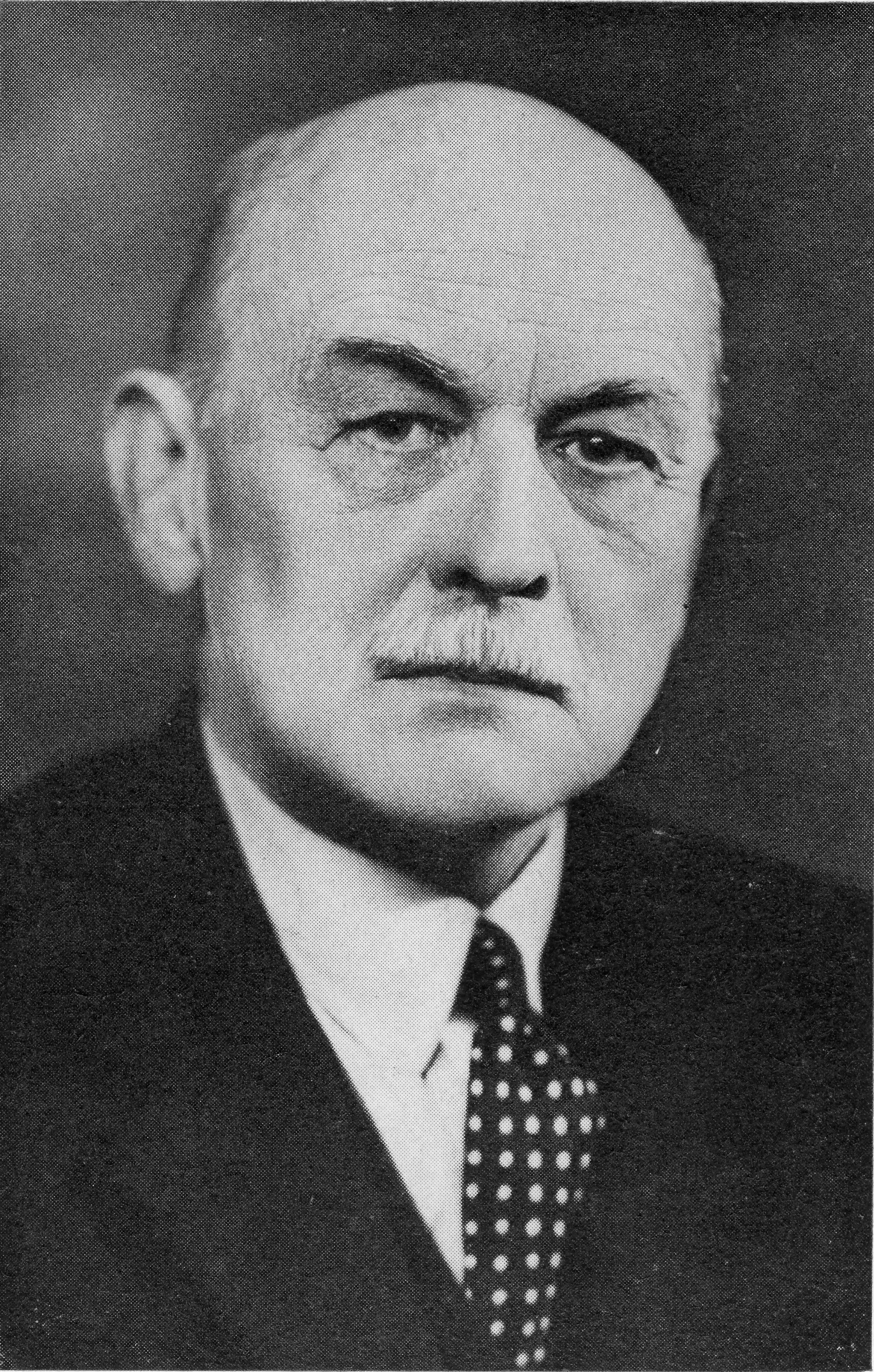
Col F.R. Collins DSO

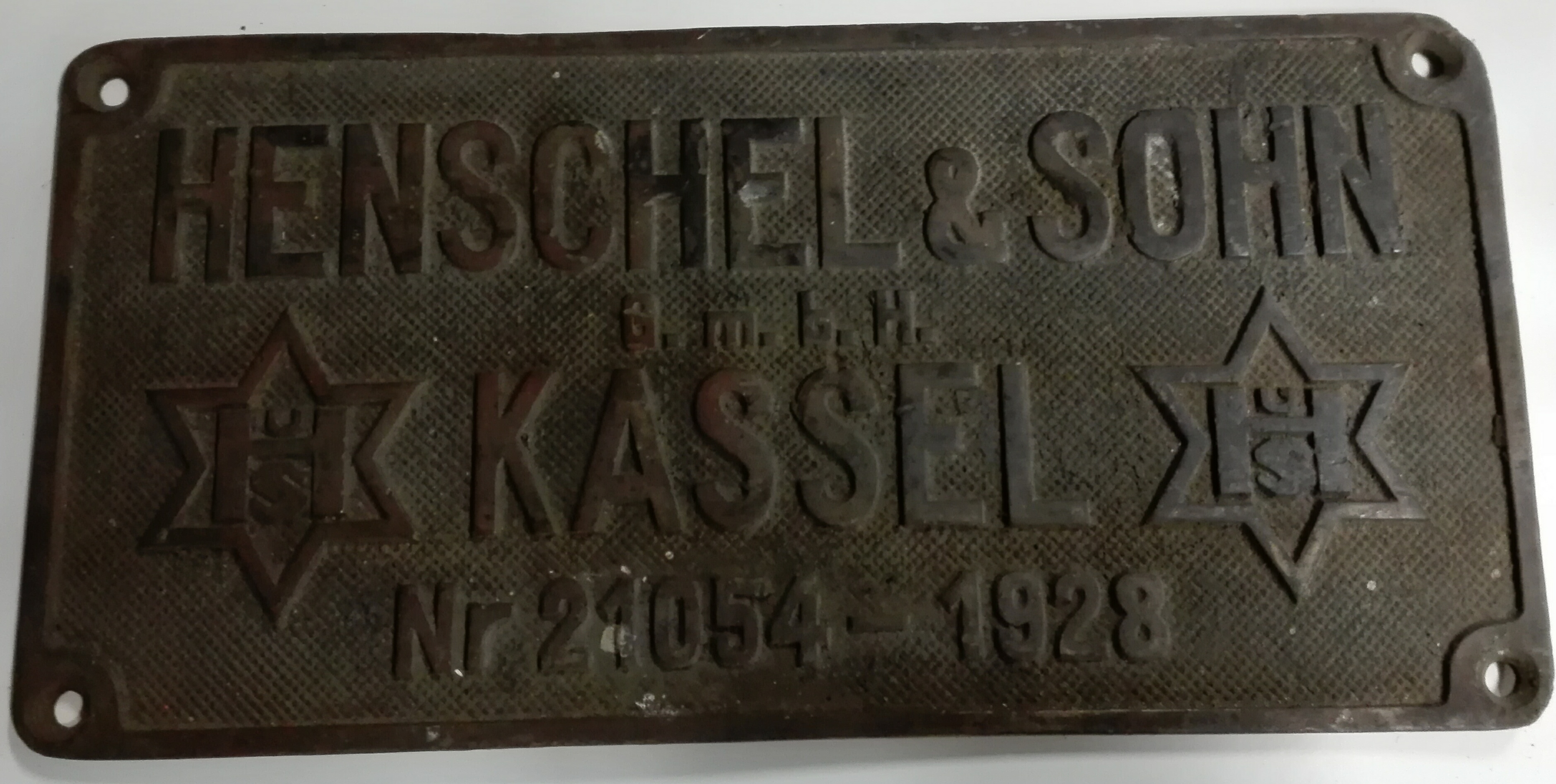
Gf

== Characteristics ==
The locomotives were superheated, had bar frames, piston valves and used Walschaerts valve gear. The Class GF was the only Double Pacific type Garratt to see service on the SAR and, until the arrival of the Class GMA, was the most numerous Garratt locomotive class in SAR service. It was designed as a mixed traffic locomotive for use on branch lines and secondary mainlines throughout the country.

As built, the Class GF had inside bearings in their two-wheeled trailing trucks and considerable trouble was experienced with hot-boxes on these axles. Once these were modified to outside bearings, they proved to be very successful locomotives. Their good turn of speed and reasonably high tractive effort made the class a good utility locomotive.

== Cabside number plates ==
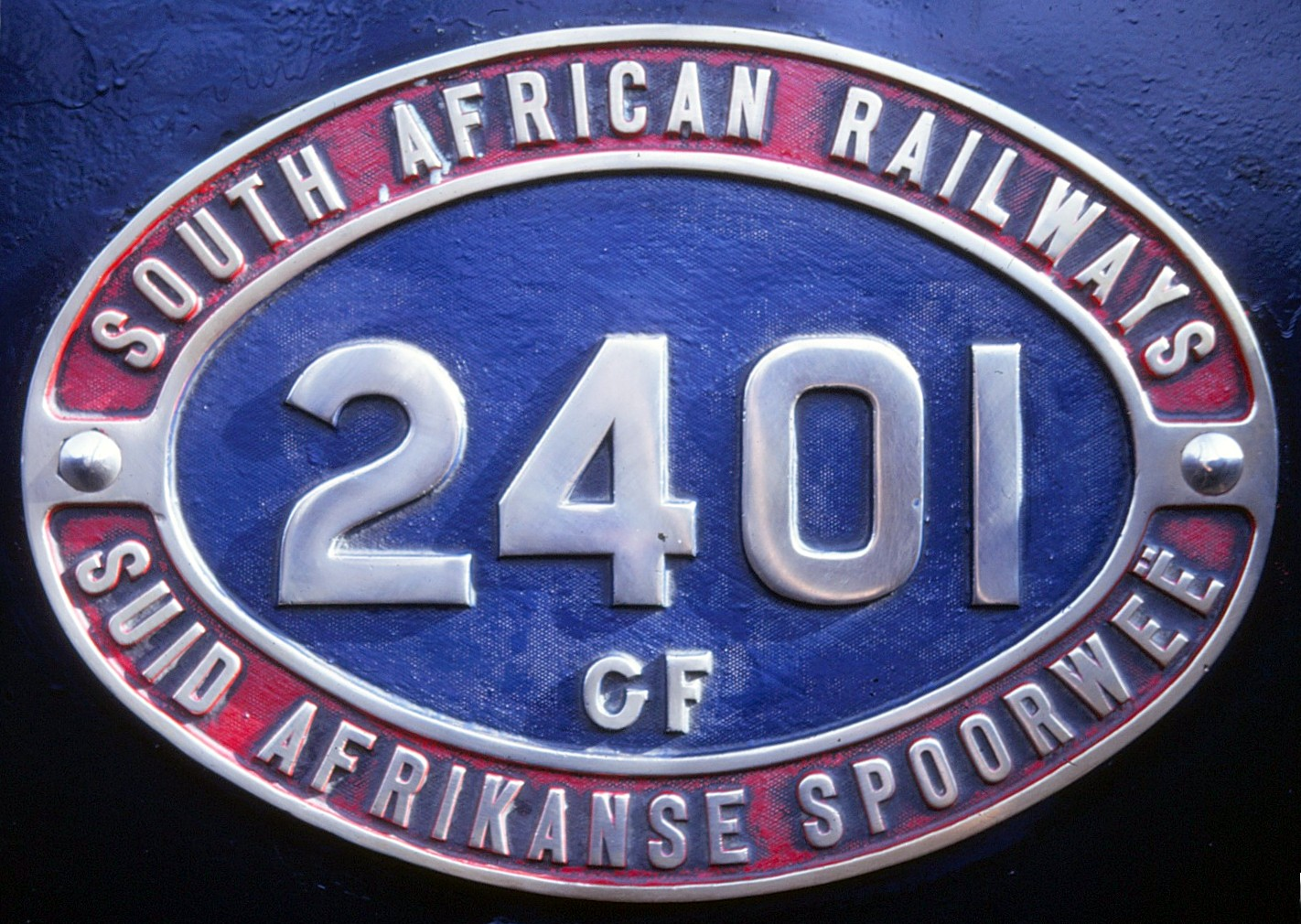

From the establishment of the SAR in 1910, cabside engine number plates were inscribed "SOUTH AFRICAN RAILWAYS" in English only. This was still the case when the Class GF entered service, as seen on a Hanomag works picture of no. 2370. After the Official Languages of the Union Act No 8 of 1925 was passed on 8 May 1925, bilingual English and Afrikaans cabside number plates began to appear on locomotives, initially inscribed "SOUTH AFRICAN RAILWAYS" at the top and "SUID AFRIKANSE SPOORWEË" at the bottom, as shown. The Afrikaans spelling conventions were changed from time to time in the early years. On postage stamps, for example, it was "Zuid Afrika" from 1913, "Suidafrika" from the airmail stamps of 1925 and hyphenated "Suid-Afrika" from 1933. On cabside number plates, the Afrikaans inscription was later altered to "SUID AFRIKAANSE SPOORWEË" with the spelling of "AFRIKANSE" changed to "AFRIKAANSE", and still later to "SUID-AFRIKAANSE SPOORWEË" hyphenated.

== Service ==
=== South African Railways ===
The Class GF saw service on many lines in Natal, Transvaal, the Orange Free State and the Eastern Cape. In Eastern Transvaal, they were stationed at Nelspruit to work the branches to Graskop and Plaston. Along with the Class GE, some worked out of Johannesburg via Krugersdorp and Zeerust on the Mafeking line. Here, they were allowed to carry an increased coal load of 11 long tons 10 hundredweight (11.7 tonnes), compared to the 10 long tons (10.2 tonnes) which they were allowed on lighter rail elsewhere.

The bulk of the Class GF fleet worked in Natal. They were used extensively on the Verulam and other North Coast local passenger services. Some were stationed at Empangeni to work the sugar cane traffic from Mtubatuba, while most were based at Mason's Mill to work the various branches which radiated from Pietermaritzburg. They worked a daily passenger train from Franklin to Kokstad, but on the other branches they were mainly used on goods and mixed train service.

By June 1964, Greyville was still allocated nine Class GFs which were used mainly on local passenger and pick-up goods trains. Apart from four which were sold and two which were scrapped after collisions, the Class GF were all still in stock by 1972, although not all were still in operation. The last one in SAR service was scrapped in 1979.

=== Mozambique ===
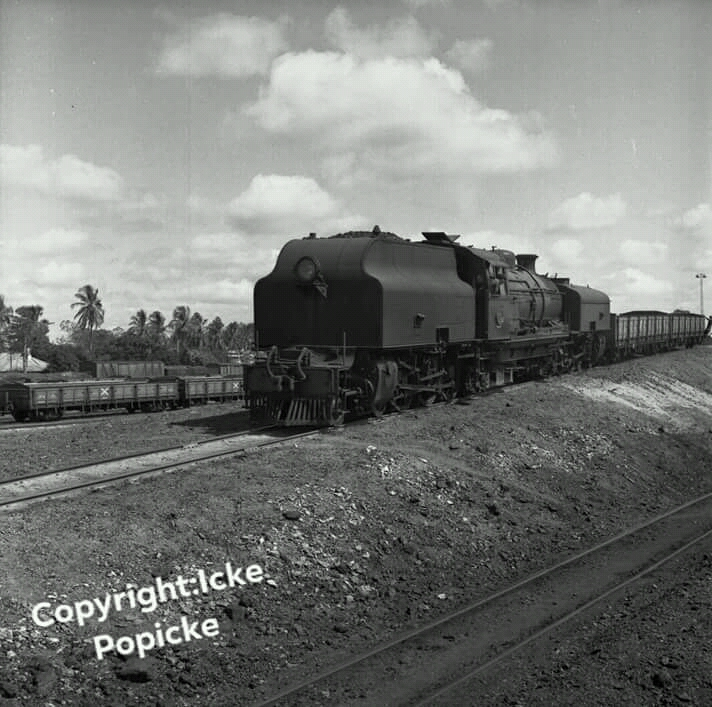
Gf 2420

Four of the Class GF, numbers 2370, 2419, 2420 and 2432, were sold to the Caminhos de Ferro de Moçambique where they were designated the Series 911, numbered in the range from 911 to 914.

=== Industrial ===
Several of the Class GF locomotives were sold into mining service upon retirement. Most went to the Enyati Railway where, in later years, some were equipped with diesel-driven air brake equipment which was installed in a cage behind the coal bunker, since some of the SAR's air braked coal export block trains originated on the Enyati. As far as is known, the locomotives in industrial service were the following:

- Numbers 2371, 2377, 2378, 2386. 2387, 2399, 2404, 2415, 2417, 2425 and 2429 went to the Enyati Railway of Enyati Collieries.
- No. 2433 went to Transvaal Navigation Collieries.
- One locomotive went to Tweefontein United Collieries and is believed to have later been transferred to Enyati.

== Knuckle couplers ==
In 1927, the SAR began to convert the couplers of its Cape Gauge rolling stock from the Johnston link-and-pin coupling system which had been in use since the establishment of the Cape Government Railways in 1873, to AAR knuckle couplers. Judging from contemporary photographs as well as the official SAR Locomotive Diagram Book and the dimensional locomotive drawings as published by Holland, which were for the most part based on the original as-delivered and unmodified locomotives, the Class GF locomotives were delivered new with knuckle couplers fitted, as were the Classes 18, GCA, HF and U which also entered service in 1927.

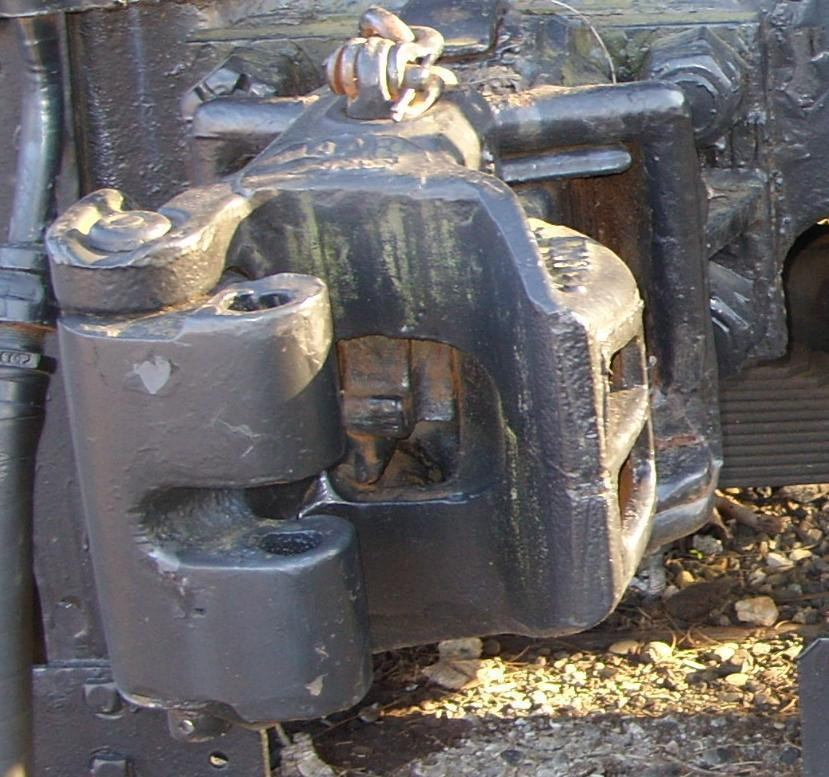
Transition era knuckle coupler

Conversion of all rolling stock would take several years and both coupler types could still be seen on rolling stock into the late 1950s. During the transition period, knuckle couplers on locomotives had a horizontal gap and a vertical hole in the knuckle itself to accommodate a link and a pin respectively. This enabled them to couple to vehicles which were still equipped with the older Johnston couplers.

Knuckle couplers had first been used in South Africa more than two decades earlier. The Central South African Railways (CSAR) introduced Gould knuckle couplers on the rolling stock of its Limited Express and Imperial Mail passenger trains in 1904. The Limited Express operated between Pretoria and Johannesburg while the Imperial Mail operated between Pretoria and Cape Town. These knuckle-couplers also had split knuckles to accommodate coupling to the old Johnston couplers with a link and pin, since the CSAR retained the old couplers on all their locomotives to keep them compatible with their own goods and older passenger rolling stock as well as with that from the other railways it connected with.

== Preservation ==
Of the Class GF Garratts, three survived into preservation. By 2020 this was their status.

Number	Works nmr	THF / Private	Leaselend / Owner	Current Location	Condition
2380		THF	Umgeni Steam Railway	Masons Mill Locomotive Depot	Scrap
2401		THF	Transnet Heritage Foundation	Outiniqua Transport Museum	Preserved
2416		THF	Ingwe Municipality	Masons Mill Locomotive Depot	Scrap

== Illustration ==
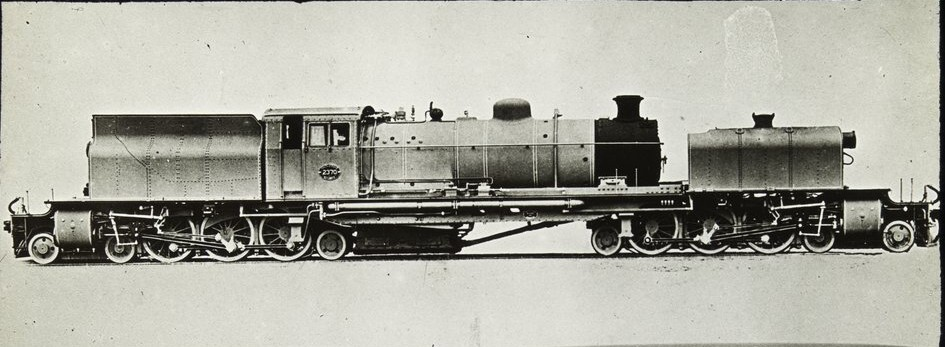
Works picture of Hannoversche Maschinenbau AG-built no. 2370, the first of the Class GF with English-only cabside number plates, c. 1927

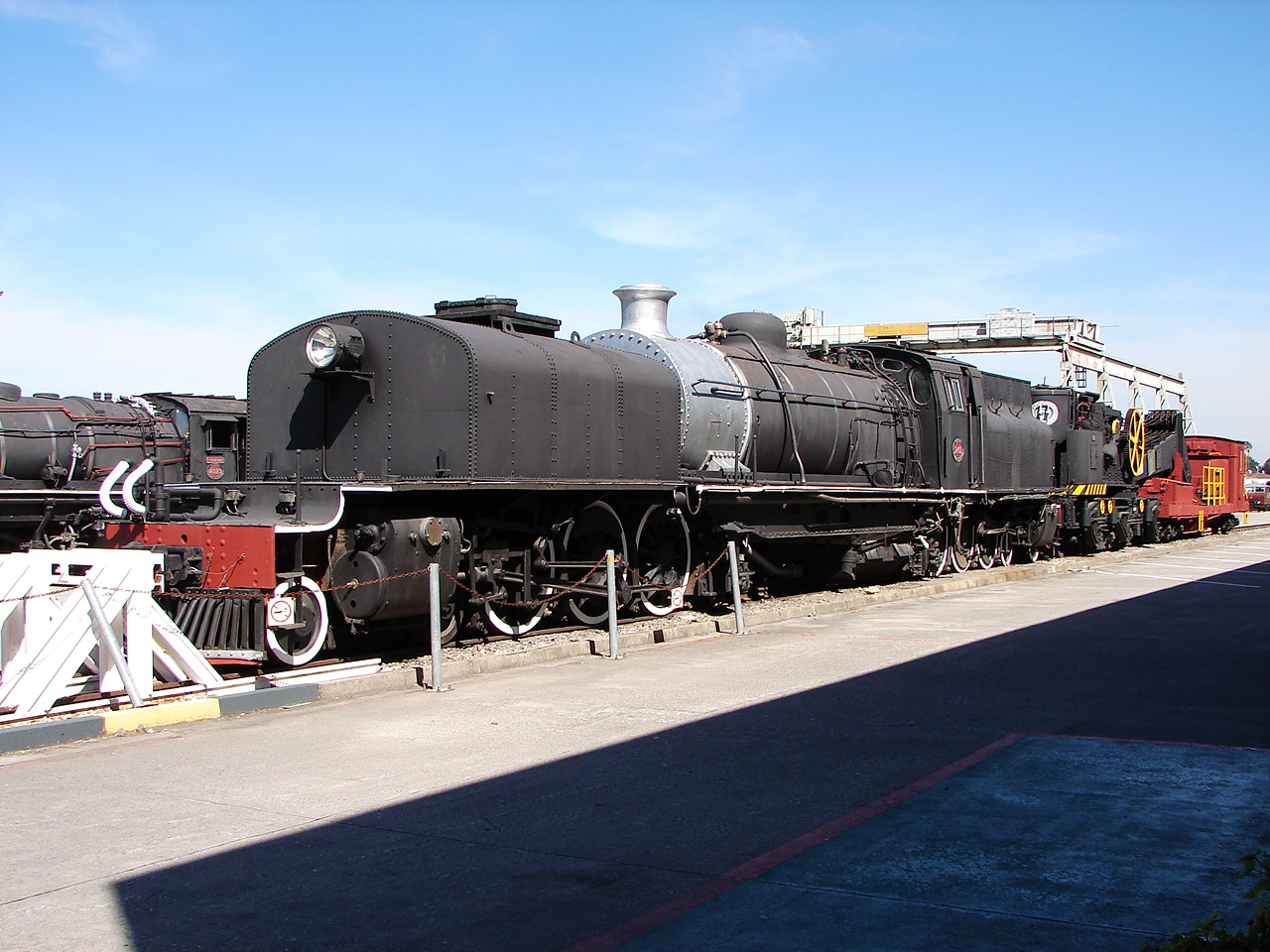
No. 2401 at the Outeniqua Transport Museum, George, 15 April 2013

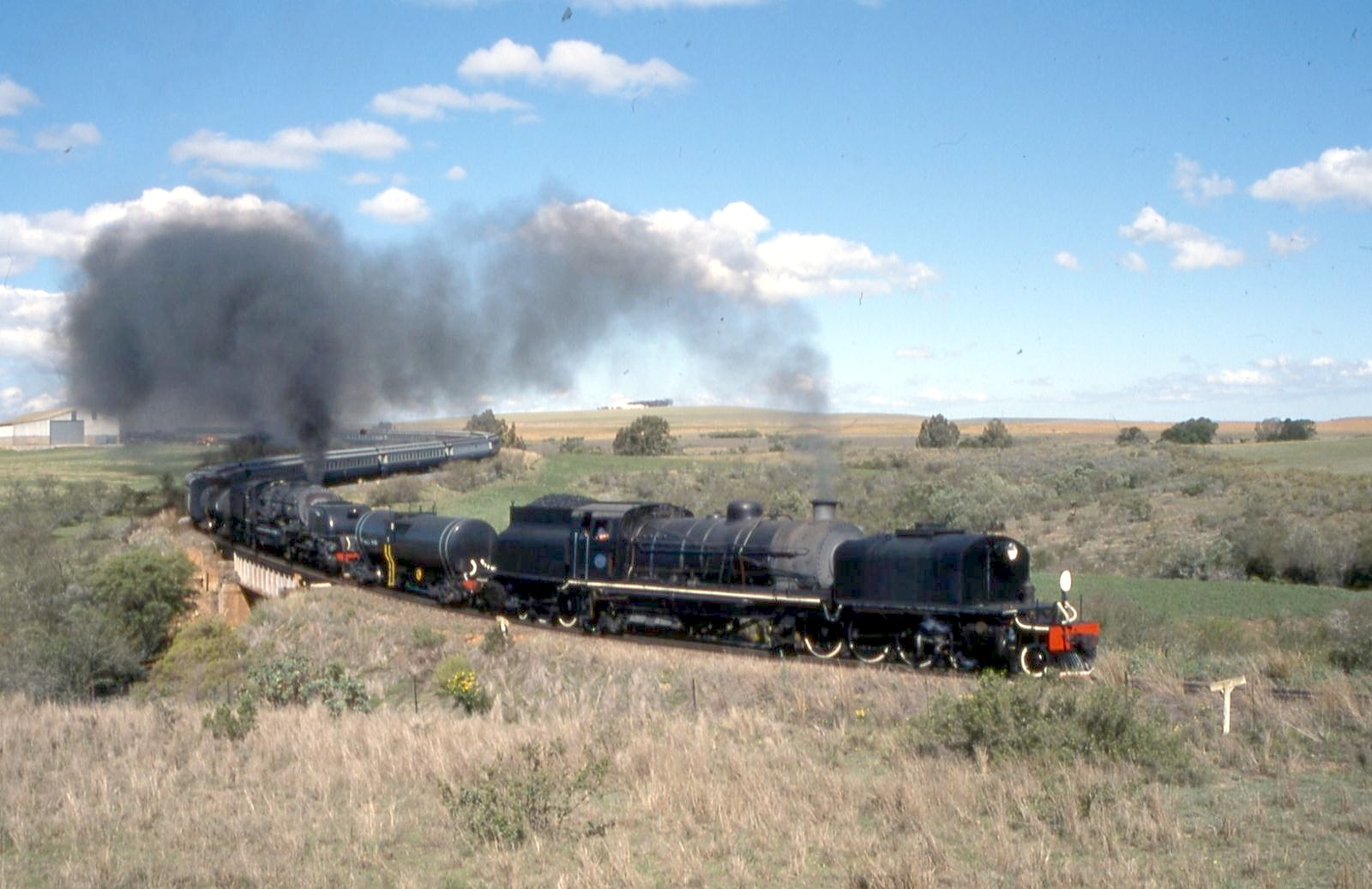
Class GF no. 2401 between Swellendam and Bonnievale, c. 2001

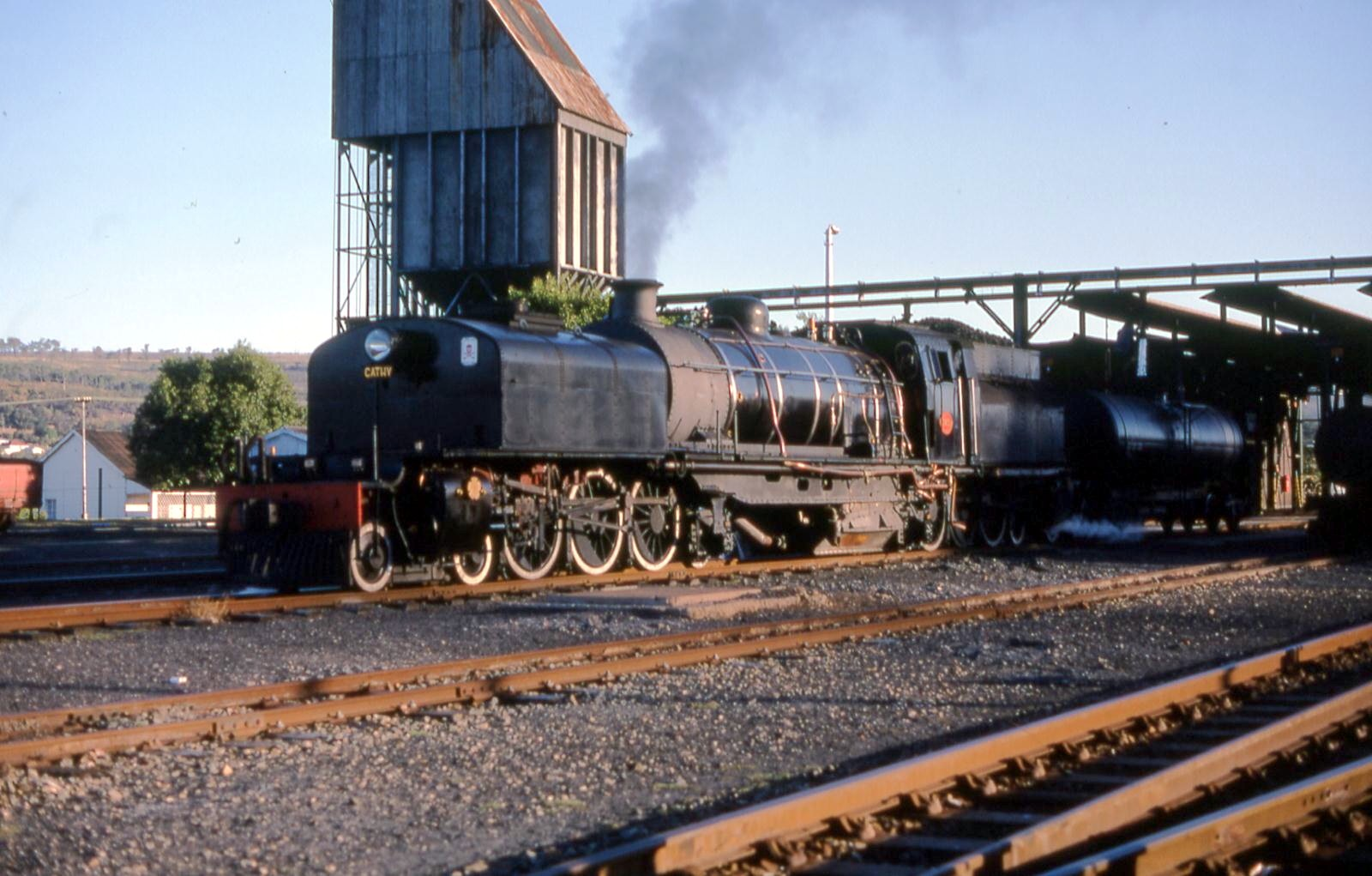
Class GF no. 2401, here named Cathy, at Grahamstown depot, c. 1991

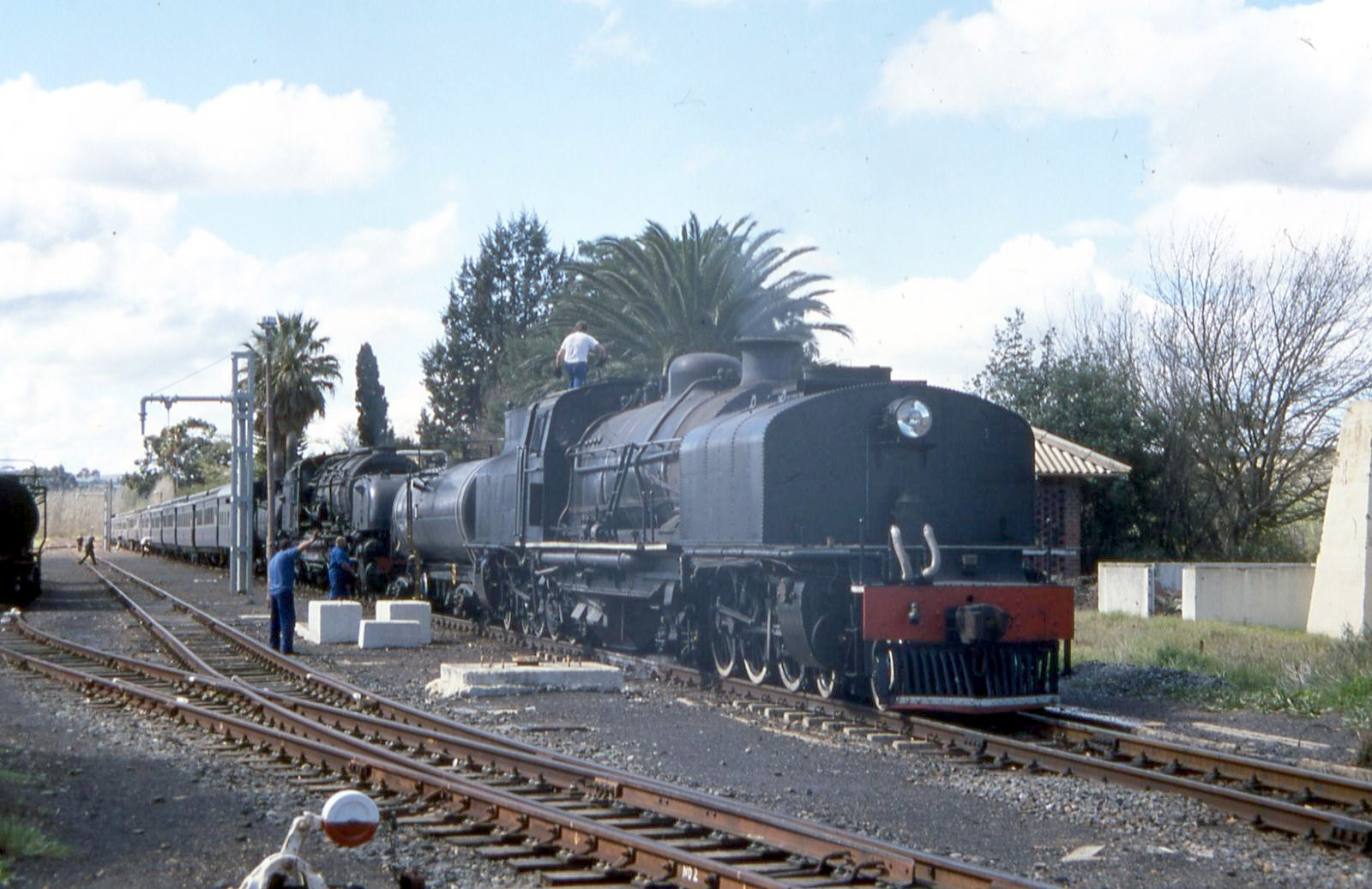
No. 2401 with a Class GMAM on the Union Limited, Buffeljagsrivier, c. 2001
