= Glencoe, KwaZulu-Natal =

Glencoe
- Location within KwaZulu-Natal Location within South Africa
- Coordinates: 28°11′00″S 30°09′00″E
- Country: South Africa
- Province: KwaZulu-Natal
- District: Umzinyathi
- Municipality: Endumeni

Area
  - Total: 26.58 km^{2} (10.26 sq mi)

Population (2011)
  - Total: 17,548
  - Density: 660.2/km^{2} (1,710/sq mi)

Racial makeup (2011)
  - Black African: 83.0%
  - Coloured: 1.0%
  - Indian/Asian: 6.9%
  - White: 8.9%
  - Other: 0.2%

First languages (2011)
  - Zulu: 76.6%
  - English: 11.9%
  - Afrikaans: 8.5%
  - Other: 3.0%
- Time zone: UTC+2 (SAST)
- Postal code (street): 2930
- PO box: 2930
- Area code: 034

Glencoe is situated in the Umzinyathi District, District of KwaZulu-Natal, South Africa.

The main economic activity in the area is coal mining along with sheep and cattle ranching.

== History ==
With coal discovered 8 km away from Dundee, an efficient way was needed to transport coal to factories other than by ox wagon. The railway from Durban to Johannesburg reached this point on 4 September 1889. A new village sprung up where a branch line was built from the Durban-Johannesburg line to the eastern Transvaal in 1903. The village was renamed Glencoe, after a mountain valley in Lochaber, Scotland, it became a town in 1934.

== Trivia ==
- General French was periodically stationed here during the Second Boer War.
- Boer President Paul Kruger twice stayed overnight during the Siege of Ladysmith, South Africa.
- The house of Carl Landman - second in command at the Battle of Blood River can be found on a farm close to Glencoe.
- Fort Mistake, a fort designed as a communications link between Ladysmith and Newcastle in 1881 and playing a key role in the Anglo-Boer War is nearby.
