= South African Class U 2-6-2+2-6-2 =

1927 articulated steam locomotive

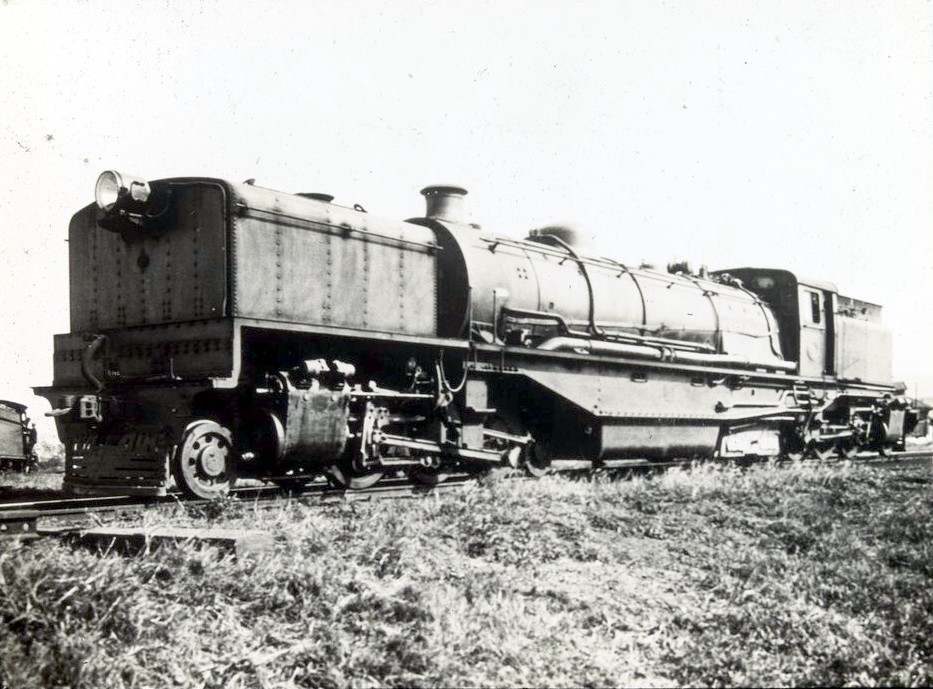
- Class U Union Garratt, c. 1930
Type and origin
- Power type: Steam
- Designer: Maffei
- Builder: Maffei
- Serial number: 5673-5682
- Model: Class U
- Build date: 1927
- Total produced: 10
Specifications
- Configuration
  - Whyte: 2-6-2+2-6-2 (Double Prairie)
  - UIC: 1'C1'+1'C1'h4t
- Driver: 3rd & 4th coupled axles
- Gauge: 3 ft 6 in (1,067 mm) Cape gauge
- Leading dia.: 30 in (762 mm)
- Coupled dia.: 48 in (1,219 mm)
- Trailing dia.: 30 in (762 mm)
- Wheelbase: 66 ft 11 in (20,396 mm)
  - Engine: 19 ft 8 in (5,994 mm) each
  - Coupled: 9 ft (2,743 mm) each
- Pivot centres: 39 ft 1 in (11,913 mm)
- Length
  - Over couplers: 74 ft 8 in (22,758 mm)
- Width: 10 ft (3,048 mm)
- Height: 12 ft 11 7/16 in (3,948 mm)
- Frame type: Bar
- Axle load: 18 LT 12 cwt (18,900 kg)
  - Leading: 16 LT (16,260 kg) front 11 LT 1 cwt (11,230 kg) rear
  - 1st coupled: 18 LT 9 cwt (18,750 kg)
  - 2nd coupled: 18 LT 2 cwt (18,390 kg)
  - 3rd coupled: 18 LT 1 cwt (18,340 kg)
  - 4th coupled: 18 LT 10 cwt (18,800 kg)
  - 5th coupled: 18 LT 12 cwt (18,900 kg)
  - 6th coupled: 18 LT 6 cwt (18,590 kg)
  - Trailing: 12 LT 12 cwt (12,800 kg) front 15 LT 3 cwt (15,390 kg) rear
- Adhesive weight: 110 LT (111,800 kg)
- Loco weight: 164 LT 16 cwt (167,400 kg)
- Fuel type: Coal
- Fuel capacity: 14 LT (14,220 kg)
- Water cap.: 2,640 imp gal (12,000 L) front 2,640 imp gal (12,000 L) belly
- Firebox
  - Type: Round-top
  - Grate area: 60 sq ft (5.6 m^{2})
- Boiler
  - Pitch: 8 ft 3/4 in (2,457 mm)
  - Diameter: 6 ft 1 in (1,854 mm)
  - Tube plates: 18 ft 1/2 in (5,499 mm)
  - Small tubes: 170: 2 1/4 in (57 mm)
  - Large tubes: 30: 5 1/2 in (140 mm)
- Boiler pressure: 180 psi (1,241 kPa)
- Safety valve: Pop
- Heating surface
  - Firebox: 195 sq ft (18.1 m^{2})
  - Tubes: 2,586 sq ft (240.2 m^{2})
  - Arch tubes: 25 sq ft (2.3 m^{2})
  - Total surface: 2,806 sq ft (260.7 m^{2})
- Superheater
  - Heating area: 633 sq ft (58.8 m^{2})
- Cylinders: Four
- Cylinder size: 18 1/2 in (470 mm) bore 26 in (660 mm) stroke
- Valve gear: Heusinger
- Valve type: Piston
- Couplers: AAR knuckle
Performance figures
- Tractive effort: 50,050 lbf (222.6 kN) @ 75%
Career
- Operators: South African Railways
- Class: Class U
- Number in class: 10
- Numbers: 1370–1379
- Nicknames: U Boat
- Delivered: 1927
- First run: 1927
- Withdrawn: c. 1958

The South African Railways Class U 2-6-2+2-6-2 of 1927 was an articulated steam locomotive.

In 1927, the South African Railways placed ten Class U Union Garratt articulated steam locomotives with a 2-6-2+2-6-2 Double Prairie type wheel arrangement in service. The locomotive design embodied the Garratt design at the front end and the Modified Fairlie design at the rear end.

== Manufacturer ==
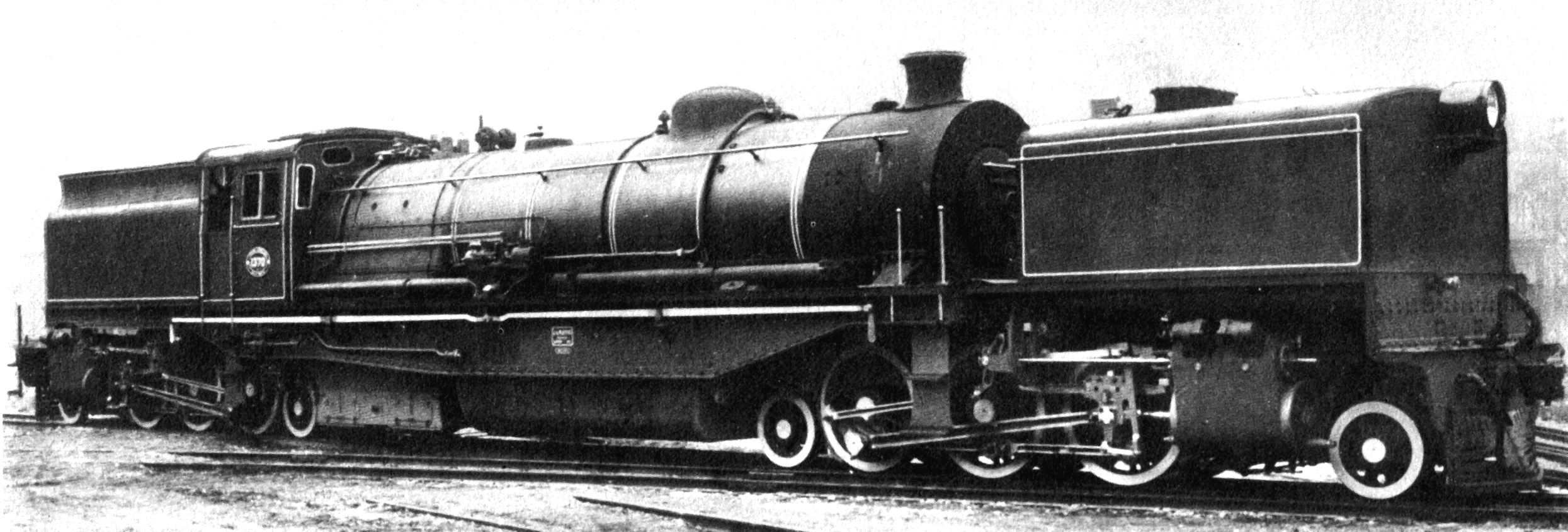
Class U Union Garratt no. 1370

Specifications for the Class GJ 2-6-2+2-6-2 Garratt locomotive were prepared by Colonel F.R. Collins DSO, Chief Mechanical Engineer of the South African Railways (SAR) in 1925, but the class designation was changed to Class U when orders for its design and construction were placed with Maffei in Munich, Germany. The locomotive design deviated from the Garratt principle, the patent of which was held by Beyer, Peacock & Company, and the result was a hybrid locomotive, part Garratt and part Modified Fairlie. Ten locomotives were delivered in 1927, numbered in the range from 1370 to 1379.

== Characteristics ==
The front end of the locomotive was of a typical Garratt arrangement with a water bunker mounted on the front engine unit's frame, while the rear end was constructed in the Modified Fairlie fashion with the coal bunker mounted on a rigid extension of the locomotive's main frame and with the pivoting rear engine unit positioned beneath the coal bunker. One reason which had been put forward for the construction of the rear end on the Modified Fairlie principle was to enable the coal bunker to be rigidly in line with the boiler frame to ensure a satisfactory arrangement for the installation of the mechanical stoker. Since the locomotive was neither Garratt nor Modified Fairlie, its unique configuration was dubbed Union Garratt.

The locomotives were superheated and had round-topped fireboxes, Walschaerts valve gear and bar frames. To enable the longest boiler possible without increasing the overall length of the locomotive, the front engine unit was tucked in underneath the boiler frame somewhat further than was usual on a purebred Garratt locomotive. An additional underbelly water tank compensated for the resulting diminished water capacity of the front water bunker.

All the engine's water was carried in the front bunker tank and in the large underbelly tank, each tank with a capacity of 2,640 imperial gallons (12,000 litres; 3,170 US gallons). The rear bunker carried only coal and had a capacity of 14 long tons (14.2 tonnes). The main frame therefore carried the smokebox, boiler, firebox, cab and coal bunker, as well as the underbelly water tank.

The Class U were large and powerful locomotives. With their 60 square feet (5.6 square metres) firegrate, they were originally equipped with mechanical stokers of the duplex type, but these were removed at the Germiston shops in 1937. Two reasons were given for the removal, firstly that the locomotives were being used in short-haul service on the Reef by then and secondly that the stokers were difficult to clear in the event of a blockage.

== Shortcomings ==
As delivered, the Class U locomotives were found to be somewhat sluggish. An alteration of the exhaust passages, carried out c. 1933, resulted in a considerable improvement, even though the modification was preceded by considerable controversy and correspondence.

The Modified Fairlies and the Union Garratt variations of it were not successful and they suffered from the same shortcomings. On the Union Garratt, as on the Modified Fairlie, the frame was also prone to metal fatigue and cracking brought about by the long frame overhang at the rear beyond the engine unit's pivot centre. The overhang, laden with the coal bunker of which more than 80% extended beyond the rear pivot centre, was subjected to severe vertical vibration while the locomotive was in motion and this led to structural weakening of the frame over time.

In addition, the rear pivot bearings were subject to quite rapid wear since they carried a considerable additional vertical load compared to those on a purebred Garratt. As was the case with the Modified Fairlie, this required increased frequency of maintenance and, as a consequence, increased operating cost.

== Service ==
The Union Garratts, referred to as U-boats by the enginemen, were placed in service at Glencoe to work the difficult section of the Natal mainline through Newcastle and the reverses at Ingogo across the continental divide at Laing's Nek to Volksrust. During electrification of the Natal line to Volksrust, completed in 1938, most of them were transferred to Germiston.

On the Witwatersrand they were used mainly for pick-up work and local workings as haulers. Since they were no longer required to drag freights for hours on end up 1 in 50 (2%) gradients, their mechanical stokers were removed. Two locomotives remained in Natal to be employed on the coal line between Vryheid and Hlobane.

Even though the Class U proved to be less successful than the purebred Garratts, some of them remained in service for more than thirty years. All ten were withdrawn from service by 1958.

== Knuckle couplers ==
In 1927, the SAR began to convert the couplers of its Cape Gauge rolling stock from the Johnston link-and-pin coupling system which had been in use since the establishment of the Cape Government Railways in 1873, to AAR knuckle couplers. Judging from contemporary photographs as well as the official SAR Locomotive Diagram Book and the dimensional locomotive drawings as published by Holland, which were for the most part based on the original as-delivered and unmodified locomotives, the Class U were delivered new with knuckle couplers fitted, as were the Classes 18, GCA, GF and HF which also entered service in 1927.

Conversion of all rolling stock would take several years and both coupler types could still be seen on rolling stock into the late 1950s. During the transition period, knuckle couplers on locomotives had a horizontal gap and a vertical hole in the knuckle itself to accommodate a link and a pin respectively. This enabled them to couple to vehicles which were still equipped with the older Johnston couplers.

Knuckle couplers had first been used in South Africa more than two decades earlier. The Central South African Railways (CSAR) introduced Gould knuckle couplers on the rolling stock of its Limited Express and Imperial Mail passenger trains in 1904. The Limited Express operated between Pretoria and Johannesburg while the Imperial Mail operated between Pretoria and Cape Town. These knuckle-couplers also had split knuckles to accommodate coupling to the old Johnston couplers with a link and pin, since the CSAR retained the old couplers on all their locomotives to keep them compatible with their own goods and older passenger rolling stock as well as with that from the other railways it connected with.
