= Molefe =

Molefe is a surname. Notable people with the surname include:

- Brian Molefe, South African businessman and politician
- California Molefe (born 1980), Botswanan runner
- Kgaudisa Molefe (born 2000), South African cricketer
- Matee Molefe, South African sailor
- Popo Molefe (born 1952), South African politician
- Thabang Molefe (born 1979), South African football player

== Given name ==
- Molefe Lekoekoe, Lesothan football player
- Molefe Pheto (born 1935), South African musician
