= Hlatshwayo =

Hlatshwayo is a South African surname that may refer to

- Isaac Hlatshwayo (born 1977), South African professional boxer
- Thulani Hlatshwayo (born 1989), South African football defender

== See also ==
- Hlatshwayo v Hein, a 1998 case in South African law
