= Sithembile =

Sithembile is an African unisex given name. Notable people with the name include:

- Sithembile Gumbo (1962/1963–2019), Zimbabwean politician
- Sithembile Langa (born 1995), South African cricketer
- Sithembile Makongolo (born 1985), South African cricketer
- Sithembile Nkosi, South African politician
