= Mechanical stoker =

Component of many steam powered machines

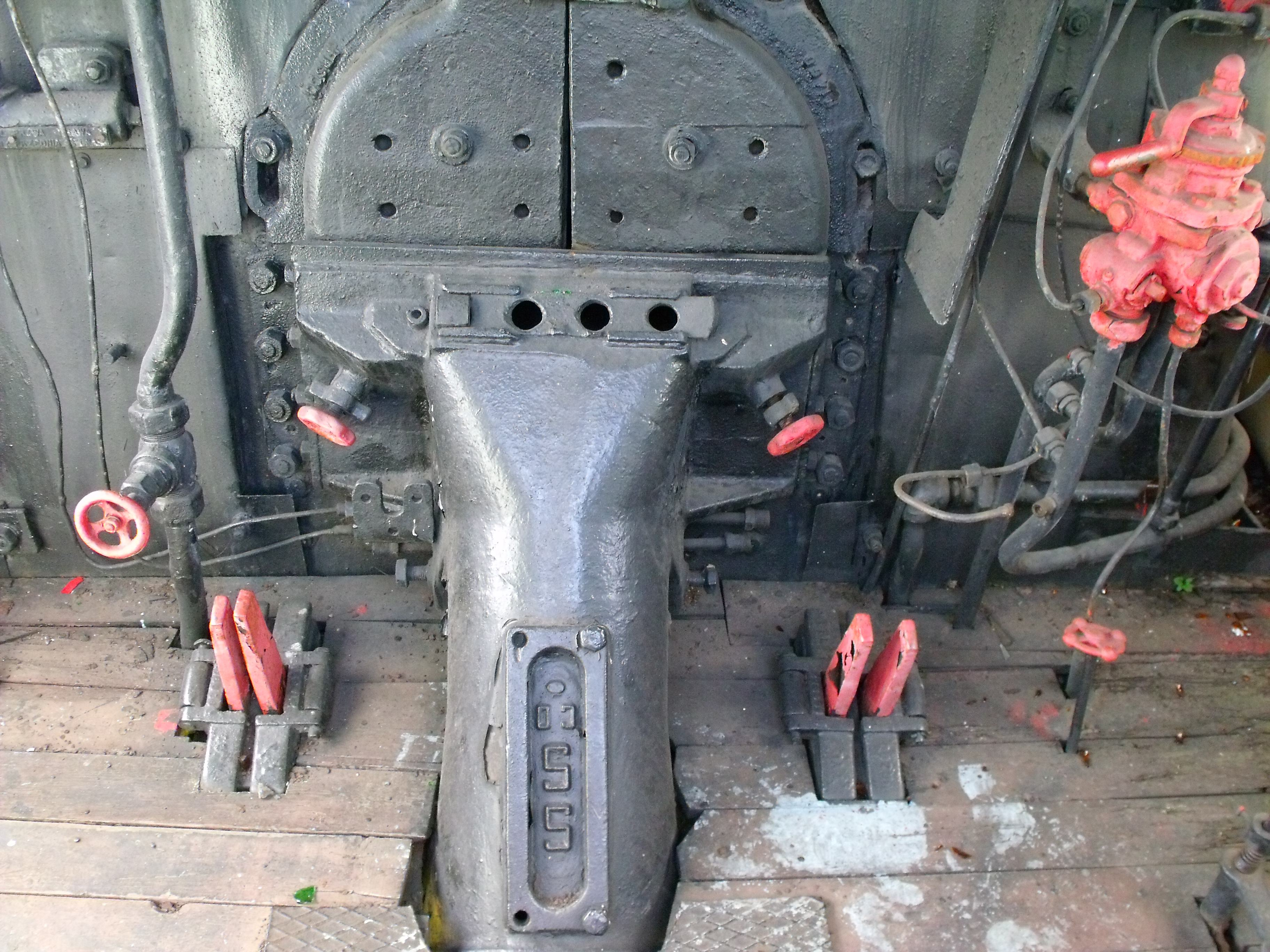
The furnace end of a Polish mechanical stoker entering a steam locomotive firebox.

A mechanical stoker is a mechanical system that feeds solid fuel like coal, coke or anthracite into the furnace of a steam boiler. It became increasingly common on steam locomotives after 1900 and is also used on ships and in power stations. Known now as a spreader stoker, it remains in use, especially in furnaces fueled by wood pellets or refuse.

There are three types: the over-feed, the under-feed and the cross-feed. An over-feeder delivers coal on to the top of the coals already in the furnace in the manner of a human working a shovel. An under-feeder pushes fresh coal into the bottom of the furnace and then advances it upwards so that it mixes with the burning coal above.

Depending on design, the mechanical means used in the stoker are combinations of a screw feed, a conveyor belt, a bucket chain, a paddle or a ram. Jets powered by steam from the boiler, or some mechanical contrivance, were often used to throw coal into the far reaches of the furnace.

== Use in steam locomotives ==
The confined working conditions of a steam locomotive cab meant that the earliest development of the stoker took place on railway locomotives. Designers sought to maximize the power output of the locomotive by feeding coal at a rate faster than the fireman could shovel.

In railway locomotives, the stoker was usually powered by a small steam engine in the tender which drew its steam from the main boiler.

In early designs, the coal was still shovelled by the fireman into a hopper which fed into a crusher, from which a screw or bucket elevator would lift the pulverised coal to a position where it could be mechanically scattered by a spreader across the burning coals of the firebox. The spreader might use jets of steam, mechanical arms, or a fast rotating plate.

Later designs mechanised the retrieval of the coal from the tender, using steam-powered pushers and/or a helical screw.

=== Some notable types ===
- The earliest practical design is from 1905 and was known as the Crawford after D. F. Crawford, Superintendent of Lines West at the Pennsylvania Railroad. It used a system of paddles to push coal forward and it was fed into the firebox at grate level.
- The Street type consisted of a coal crusher, hand-fed by the fireman, that was fitted to the front left-hand side of the tender footplate and was driven by a small steam engine mounted behind the hand brake column. The crushed coal then fell by gravity into a chute which led to a receiving bin that was fitted below the back buffer beam of the locomotive, from where it was picked up by a bucket elevator travelling in large tubes. The full buckets were carried up in the left-hand side tube mounted on the back of the firebox, discharged into a central receiver and then travelled down the right hand side tube.
- The Duplex type was manufactured by the Locomotive Stoker Company, Pittsburgh, PA. It used a screw feed to bring coal forward from the tender, and two vertical screw feeds to raise the fuel into the left and right sides of the firebox.
