= Dundee, KwaZulu-Natal =

Dundee
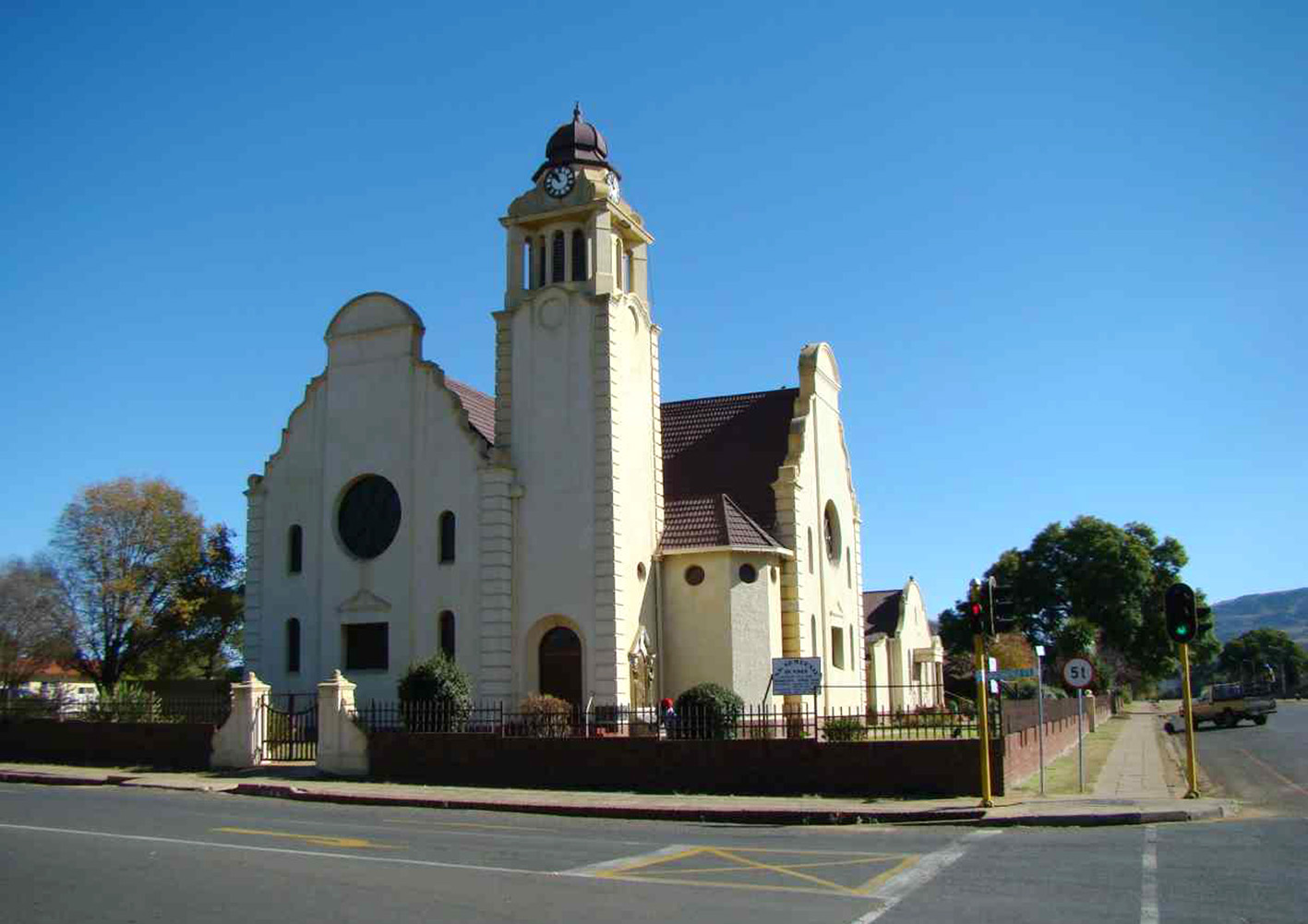
- Dutch Reformed Church, Dundee

- Location within KwaZulu-Natal Location within South Africa
- Coordinates: 28°10′21″S 30°13′53″E
- Country: South Africa
- Province: KwaZulu-Natal
- District: Umzinyathi
- Municipality: Endumeni
- Established: 1835

Area
  - Total: 48.60 km^{2} (18.76 sq mi)

Population (2025)
  - Total: 47,460
  - Density: 976.5/km^{2} (2,529/sq mi)

Racial makeup (2011)
  - Black African: 81.2%
  - Coloured: 4.1%
  - Indian/Asian: 7.0%
  - White: 7.2%
  - Other: 0.5%

First languages (2011)
  - Zulu: 76.3%
  - English: 15.6%
  - Afrikaans: 4.5%
  - Other: 3.7%
- Time zone: UTC+2 (SAST)
- Postal code (street): 3000
- PO box: 3000
- Area code: 034

The coal mining town of Dundee is situated in a valley of the Biggarsberg mountains in KwaZulu-Natal, South Africa (28°10′S 30°14′E). It is part of the Endumeni Municipality, Umzinyathi District. It is very rich in coal deposits. More populous than the town of Dundee is its adjacent township named Sibongile. This township is now being extended with many residing zones, e.g. Lindelani.

Dundee was established by Peter Smith, with land contributed by his son in-law, in 1882 after the realisation that the valley was a natural way for travellers into the interior of Africa. Traders, hunters explorers, missionaries and soldiers all made their way through here. A large fort, Fort Jones, housed British troops in the area during the Anglo Zulu War of 1879. The discovery of coal in the area dates from early Voortrekker records of 1838 and later geological surveys in the 1860s. It is named after the hometown of a pioneering Scottish settler, Peter Smith. At first, Dundee was a farm (Dundee farm), the property of Peter Smith, which he had bought from a Voortrekker settler, Mr Dekker. Three other men are also credited with the founding of Dundee; his son William Craighead Smith, son-in-law Dugald McPhail, and close family friend Charles Wilson.<Talana Museum>

== Geography ==
The town lies nestled in a valley of the picturesque Biggarsberg and is surrounded by historical remarkable mountains of “Indumeni” (where the thunder rolls), “Mpati” (The place of good waters), and “Talana” (The shelf where precious items are kept). Dundee has trails of the San people that lived here 4 000 – 5 000 years ago. Evidence of this is to be found in lifestyle and rock paintings in several caves and shelters.

=== Climate ===
Dundee has a subtropical highland climate (Cwb, according to the Köppen climate classification), with pleasant summers and cool, dry winters. The average annual precipitation is 684 mm (27 in), with rainfall occurring mainly during summer.

Dundee

Climate chart (precipitation, max. and min. temperature)
J	F	M	A	M	J	J	A	S	O	N	D
134 26 14	104 26 14	85 25 12	31 23 9	8 21 6	1 19 3	1 19 3	8 21 5	25 23 8	65 24 10	101 24 12	121 26 13
- █ Average max. and min. temperatures in °C
- █ Precipitation totals in mm
- Source: SA Explorer
Imperial conversion
J	F	M	A	M	J	J	A	S	O	N	D
5.3 79 57	4.1 79 57	3.3 77 54	1.2 73 48	0.3 70 43	0 66 37	0 66 37	0.3 70 41	1 73 46	2.6 75 50	4 75 54	4.8 79 55
- █ Average max. and min. temperatures in °F
- █ Precipitation totals in inches

== History ==
- The Boers reported surface coal here and named one of the streams Steenkoolspruit (Afrikaans for Coal Stream).
- Peter Smith, a Scottish settler started sending wagonloads of coal, which was discovered close to the surface, to be sold in Pietermaritzburg. This started the coal mining industry in Natal.
- The first geological survey of the Natal coalfields was made in the 1860s and proved that there were workable coal deposits.
- In 1882 a town was laid out and named after Smith’s Scottish hometown Dundee.
- Smith, with partners Dougald McPhail and Charles Willson, floated the Dundee Coal and Estate Company on the London Stock Exchange in 1899.
- Second Boer War: The British started massing troops at Dundee and were given an ultimatum by the Boers to retreat with the troops. On 20 October 1899, the first shots of the war were fired. The news of this battle hit the headlines in Britain as the "Battle of Glencoe", which was corrected the following day to the "Battle of Dundee" and on the third day to the "Battle of Talana." It was on the slopes of Talana Hill that the British army troops officially wore khaki uniforms for the first time in battle; it is also notable as the first indisputable use of indirect fire in modern warfare, and the tactic as applied by Boer field artillery had a devastating effect. After the battle, the British troops retreated to Ladysmith and Boer forces occupied the town, renaming it Meyersdorp. This occupation lasted seven months. Dundee was relieved after the battle of Helpmekaar in May 1900.

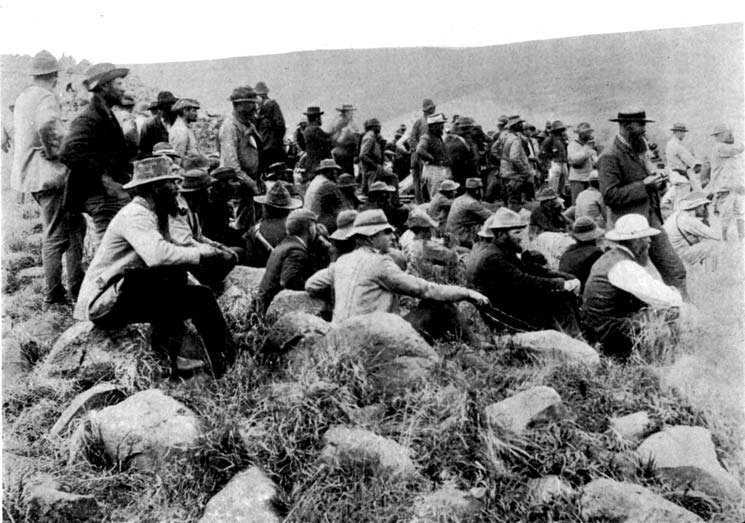
Boers watch the fighting at Dundee in 1899

- The town's folk who had left before or shortly after the battle returned and the town began to flourish again. Dundee soon emerged as a boomtown graced with stately homes and the first theatre north of Durban.
- Pioneer traders from the Indian sub-continent settled here during the following decade, when Dundee became the meeting place of seven roads into the hinterland and coast of Africa.
- Mahatma Gandhi was tried in the Dundee courthouse for civil disobedience and imprisoned in the Dundee jail.

== Popular culture ==
- The poem "The Battle of Dundee" aka "How President Kruger's Irish Took in Her Majestys Hiberians" by Rev I. Dempsey about the battle was widely circulated in print media of the time.
- In the Disney Channel Movie The Color of Friendship, one of the main characters, Mahree Bok, is from Dundee.

== Sport ==
The Northern-Natal Rhinos (Noord-Natal Renosters) Wrestling Club in Dundee is one of the top wrestling clubs in the province of Kwa-Zulu Natal.

Sentraal Rugby Club is one of the top sides in Northern-Natal. Titans Rugby club is a youth rugby team that builds future rugby players (Grassroots). Rhino Women's Rugby Club has constantly produced Sharks Craven week players and have represented Umzinyathi District in the annual Salga games

== Coat of arms ==
Dundee was a borough in its own right from 1902 to 1996. In October 1951, the council obtained a grant of arms from the Lord Lyon King of Arms in Scotland. It registered the arms at the Bureau of Heraldry in July 1995.

The arms, which were based on those of the Scottish burgh of Dundee, were : Azure, a pot with three lilies issuant Argent, charged with a miner's lamp proper and on a chief Or two wildebeest courant in fess, Sable; the shield ensigned of a mural crown Argent. In layman's terms : a blue shield displaying two black wildebeest on a golden strip above three lilies in a silver pot decorated with a miner's lamp. The motto was Per victoriam laboremque.
