= Umzinyathi District Municipality =

Coordinates: 28°10′S 30°13′E

uMzinyathi
- District municipality
- Seal

- Location in South Africa
- Country: South Africa
- Province: KwaZulu-Natal
- Seat: Dundee
- Local municipalities: List: Endumeni; Nquthu; Msinga; Umvoti

Government
  - Type: Municipal council
  - Mayor: Mbangiseni Shadrack Yengwa

Area
  - Total: 8,589 km^{2} (3,316 sq mi)

Population (2011)
  - Total: 510,838
  - Density: 59.48/km^{2} (154.0/sq mi)

Racial makeup (2011)
  - Black African: 96.6%
  - Coloured: 0.5%
  - Indian/Asian: 1.3%
  - White: 1.4%

First languages (2011)
  - Zulu: 91.0%
  - English: 3.1%
  - Sotho: 2.3%
  - Afrikaans: 1.0%
  - Other: 2.6%
- Time zone: UTC+2 (SAST)
- Municipal code: DC24

The Umzinyathi District Municipality (Zulu: UMasipala wesiFunda sase Umzinyathi) is one of the 11 districts of the KwaZulu-Natal province of South Africa. Its seat is Dundee. As of 2011, a majority of its 456,452 inhabitants spoke isiZulu. The district code is DC24

== Geography ==
=== Neighbours ===
Umzinyathi is surrounded by:

- Amajuba in the north (DC25)
- Zululand in the north-east (DC26)
- uThungulu in the east (DC28)
- iLembe in the south-east (DC29)
- uMgungundlovu in the south-west (DC22)
- Uthukela in the west (DC23)

=== Local municipalities ===
The district contains the following local municipalities:

Local municipality	Population	%
Msinga	168 022	36.81%
Nqutu	145 033	31.77%
Umvoti	92 292	20.22%
Endumeni	51 110	11.20%

== Demographics ==
The following statistics are from the 2001 census.

Language	Population	%
IsiZulu	422 801	92.63%
Sesotho	13 241	2.90%
English	12 025	2.63%
Afrikaans	4 843	1.06%
IsiNdebele	937	0.21%
IsiXhosa	645	0.14%
Sepedi	634	0.14%
Other	618	0.14%
SiSwati	459	0.10%
Setswana	172	0.04%
Xitsonga	51	0.01%
Tshivenda	31	0.01%

=== Gender ===
Gender	Population	%
Female	255 660	56.01%
Male	200 792	43.99%

=== Ethnic group ===
Ethnic group	Population	%
Black African	439 889	96.37%
White	7 336	1.61%
Indian/Asian	6 593	1.44%
Coloured	2 634	0.58%

=== Age ===
Age	Population	%
000 - 004	60 159	13.18%
005 - 009	67 630	14.82%
010 - 014	66 994	14.68%
015 - 019	59 156	12.96%
020 - 024	36 022	7.89%
025 - 029	27 821	6.10%
030 - 034	22 830	5.00%
035 - 039	22 211	4.87%
040 - 044	18 051	3.95%
045 - 049	16 182	3.55%
050 - 054	13 935	3.05%
055 - 059	10 810	2.37%
060 - 064	10 531	2.31%
065 - 069	7 612	1.67%
070 - 074	7 345	1.61%
075 - 079	4 253	0.93%
080 - 084	3 252	0.71%
085 - 089	896	0.20%
090 - 094	391	0.09%
095 - 099	274	0.06%
100 plus	97	0.02%

== Politics ==
=== Election results ===
Election results for Umzinyathi in the South African general election, 2004.

- Population 18 and over: 224 263 [49.13% of total population]
- Total votes: 122 689 [26.88% of total population]
- Voting % estimate: 54.71% votes as a % of population 18 and over

Party	Votes	%
Inkhata Freedom Party	79 544	64.83%
African National Congress	29 618	24.14%
Democratic Alliance	6 884	5.61%
African Christian Democratic Party	1 917	1.56%
United Democratic Movement	739	0.60%
Freedom Front Plus	645	0.53%
New National Party	577	0.47%
Azanian People's Organisation	351	0.29%
Minority Front	303	0.25%
Independent Democrats	291	0.24%
PJC	240	0.20%
Pan African Congress	226	0.18%
United Christian Democratic Party	202	0.16%
SOPA	181	0.15%
CDP	173	0.14%
KISS	172	0.14%
UF	148	0.12%
NA	147	0.12%
EMSA	133	0.11%
TOP	128	0.10%
NLP	70	0.06%
Total	122 689	100.00%

== See also ==
- Municipal Demarcation Board
