= TR GA class =

Tanganyika Railway GA class; East African Railways 53 class
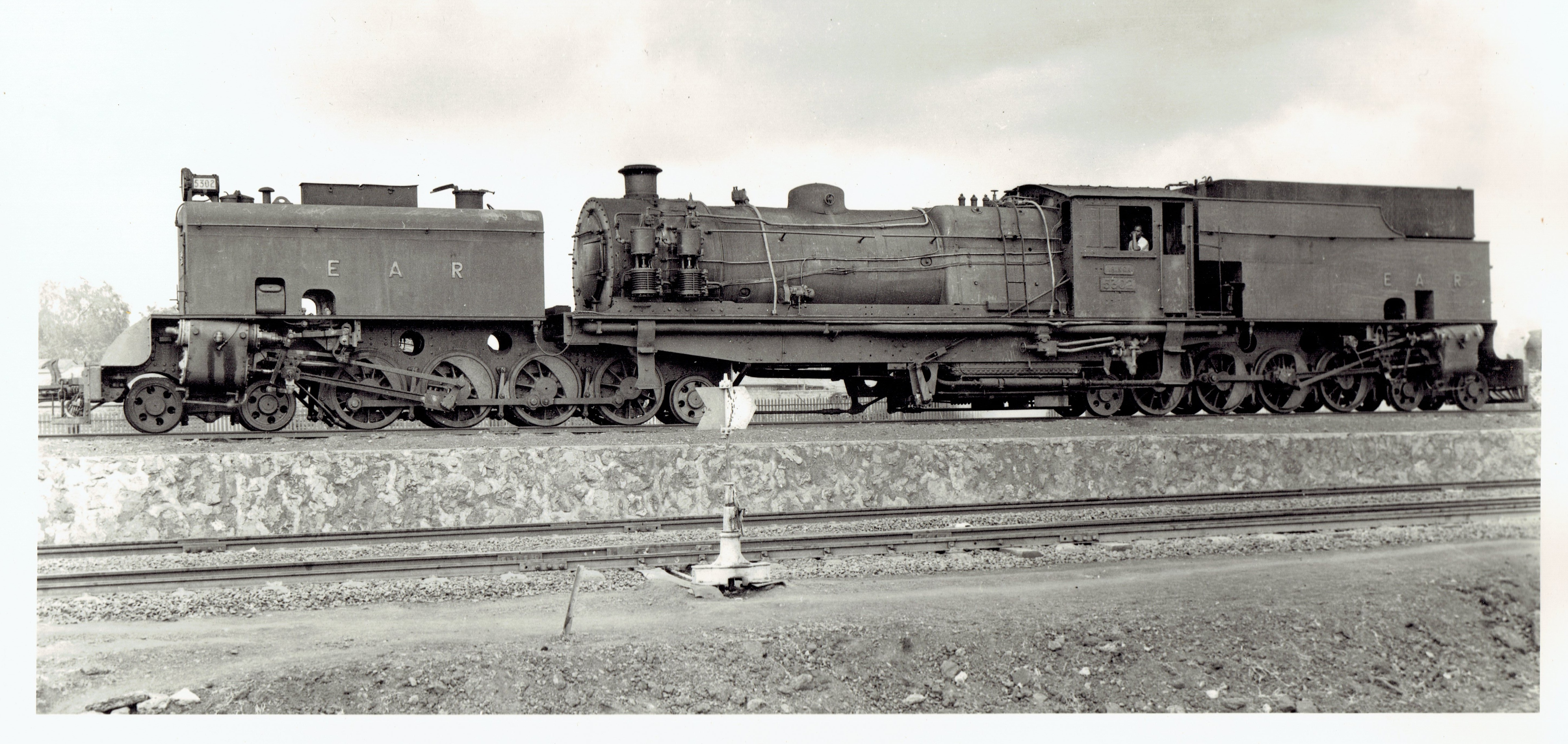
- East African Railways publicity photograph of no. 5302 Iringa, c. 1953
Type and origin
- Power type: Steam
- Builder: Beyer, Peacock & Co.
- Serial number: 6718–6720
- Build date: 1930
- Total produced: 3
Specifications
- Configuration
  - Whyte: 4-8-2+2-8-4 Garratt
  - UIC: (2′D1′)(1′D2′) h4
- Gauge: 1,000 mm (3 ft 3 3/8 in)
- Driver dia.: 43 in (1,092 mm)
- Adhesive weight: 83.8 long tons (85.1 t)
- Loco weight: 138.3 long tons (140.5 t)
- Fuel type: Oil
- Fuel capacity: 2,455 imp gal (11,160 L; 2,948 US gal)
- Water cap.: 4,925 imp gal (22,390 L; 5,915 US gal)
- Firebox
  - Grate area: 43.6 sq ft (4.05 m^{2})
- Boiler pressure: 170 psi (1.17 MPa); (180 psi (1.24 MPa))
- Heating surface
  - Firebox: 194 sq ft (18.0 m^{2})
  - Tubes: 1,856 sq ft (172.4 m^{2})
  - Total surface: 2,430 sq ft (226 m^{2})
- Superheater
  - Type: Inside
  - Heating area: 380 sq ft (35 m^{2})
- Cylinders: 4
- Cylinder size: 16.5 in × 22 in (419 mm × 559 mm)
- Valve gear: Walschaerts
Performance figures
- Tractive effort: 42,600 lbf (189.49 kN)
Career
- Operators: Tanganyika Railway (TR); → East African Railways (EAR)
- Class: TR GA class; EAR 53 class
- Number in class: 3
- Numbers: TR: 300–302; 700–702; EAR: 5301–5302
- First run: 1931

The TR GA class, later known as the EAR 53 class, was a class of 1,000 mm (3 ft 3 3/8 in) gauge 4-8-2+2-8-4 Garratt-type articulated steam locomotives. The three members of the class were built in 1930 by Beyer, Peacock & Co. in Manchester, England, for the Tanganyika Railway (TR). They entered service in 1931, and, with one exception, were later operated by the TR's successor, the East African Railways (EAR).

== Specifications ==
The design of the GA class locomotives was based upon that of the KUR EC2 class, which was built at about the same time by the North British Locomotive Company for the Kenya-Uganda Railway (KUR). The main design difference was that the GAs had higher, narrower front tanks than the EC2s. With their reduced water capacity, the GAs also had a lower axle loading, which made them suitable for operation over the World War I-damaged bridges on the Central Line.

== Service history ==
Upon entry into service in 1931, the GA class locomotives were allocated numbers 300–302. Each of them was also given a name: the first two carried the names Arusha and Iringa, respectively, after the locations of the TR's big road depots, and no. 302 was named Bukoba, as that town had a jetty for marine services. Later, the GAs were renumbered 700–702.

It was the TR's general policy to allocate tender locomotives to standard duties, and use its Garratts only for the most demanding tasks. The GA class therefore normally worked between Dar-es-Salaam and Morogoro, the heaviest part of the Central Line.

The GA class's operating costs were markedly lower than those of their predecessors. Even during the Great Depression, when traffic volumes greatly declined, they were of great operational benefit. Following the outbreak of World War II, they became indispensable.

Unfortunately one member of the class, no 702 Bukoba, was derailed by a washaway near Mikese during a night of bad weather in 1944. The crew was saved, but the locomotive was almost completely submerged and had to be scrapped.

In 1949, the TR and the KUR were merged to form the EAR, which took over the two survivors, classified them as its 53 class, and renumbered them 5301–5302.

The EAR also equipped the two survivors with a French-style ACFI feedwater heater, one of which had already been fitted to the last member of the KUR EC1 class, no 66. However, the feedwater heaters were later removed, partly because they achieved only limited improvement in thermal efficiency, and also as they had caused similar maintenance problems to those experienced by the KUR.

In the 1950s, the EAR 53 class locomotives were replaced on the Central Line by the new EAR 60 class locomotives, and therefore transferred to the northern part of the EAR system. Later, they returned to what had become Tanzania, to carry out transfer work in Dar-es-Salaam. They were withdrawn and scrapped there in the late 1960s.

== Class list ==
The numbers and names of each member of the class were as follows:

Builder's number	First TR number	Second TR number	EAR number	Name	Notes
6718	300	700	5301	Arusha	
6719	301	701	5302	Iringa	
6720	302	703	-	Bukoba	Scrapped 1944 following a derailment

== See also ==
- History of rail transport in Tanzania
- Rail transport in Kenya
- Rail transport in Uganda
