= KUR EC4 class =

Kenya-Uganda Railway EC4 class; East African Railways 54 class
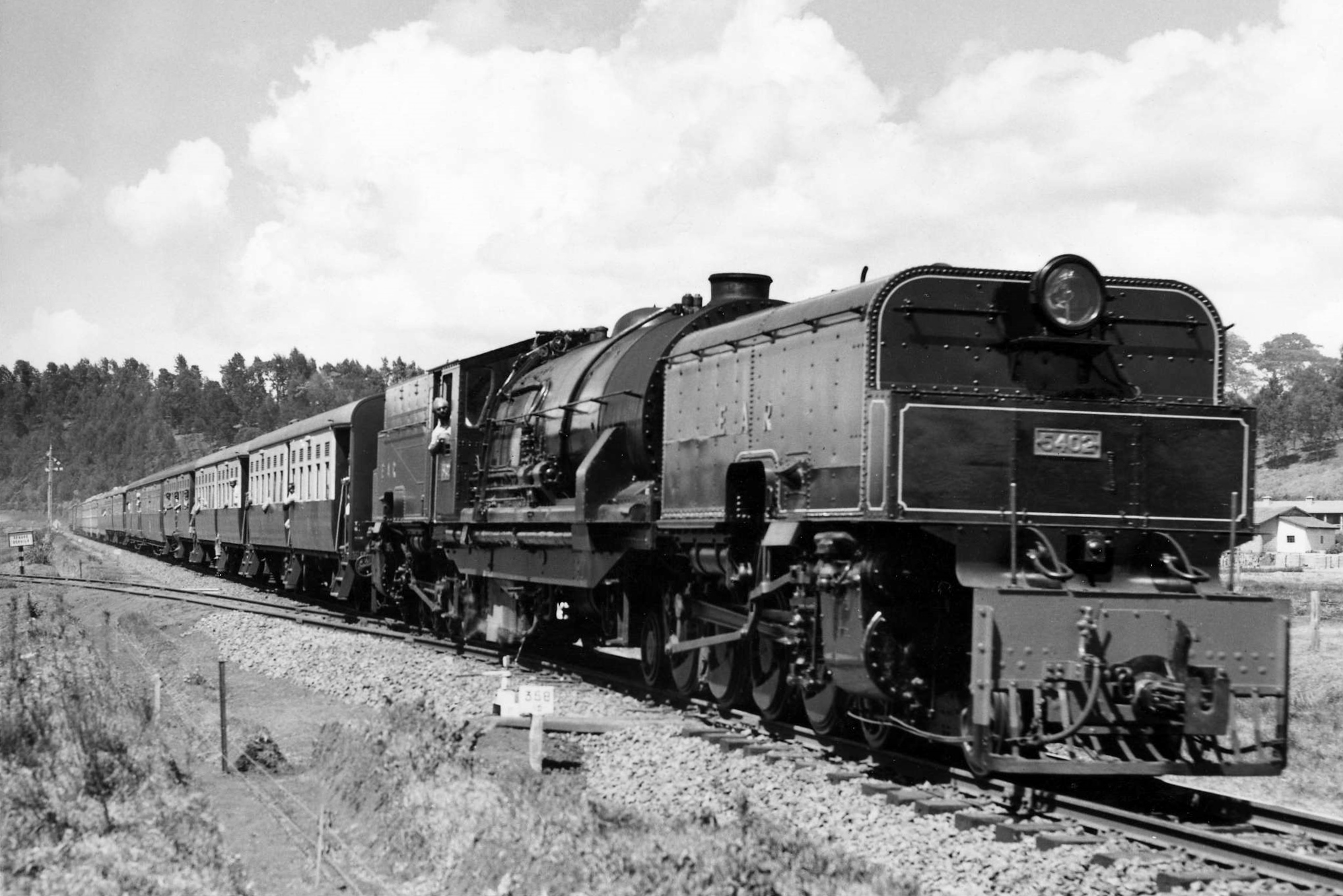
- EAR 5402 with a passenger train at Limuru, Kenya
Type and origin
- Power type: Steam
- Builder: Beyer, Peacock & Co.
- Serial number: 7075–7081
- Build date: 1944
- Total produced: 7
Specifications
- Configuration
  - Whyte: 4-8-2+2-8-4 (Garratt)
  - UIC: (2′D1′)(1′D2′) h4
- Gauge: 1,000 mm (3 ft 3 3/8 in)
- Driver dia.: 45.5 in (1,156 mm)
- Adhesive weight: 112 long tons (114 t)
- Loco weight: 171.5 long tons (174.3 t)
- Fuel type: Oil
- Fuel capacity: 2,375 imp gal (10,800 L; 2,852 US gal)
- Water cap.: 6,000 imp gal (27,000 L; 7,200 US gal)
- Firebox
  - Grate area: 51.3 sq ft (4.77 m^{2})
- Boiler pressure: 180 psi (1.24 MPa)
- Heating surface
  - Firebox: 212 sq ft (19.7 m^{2})
  - Tubes: 2,310 sq ft (215 m^{2})
  - Total surface: 2,992 sq ft (278.0 m^{2})
- Superheater
  - Type: Inside
  - Heating area: 470 sq ft (44 m^{2})
- Cylinders: 4 (Garratt)
- Cylinder size: 19 in × 24 in (483 mm × 610 mm)
- Valve gear: Walschaerts
- Loco brake: Westinghouse type
- Train brakes: Westinghouse type
Performance figures
- Tractive effort: 58,260 lbf (259.15 kN)
Career
- Operators: Kenya-Uganda Railway (KUR); → East African Railways (EAR)
- Class: KUR: EC4 class; EAR: 54 class
- Number in class: 7
- Numbers: WD: 74418–74424; KUR: 89–95/100–106; EAR: 5401–5407
- First run: 1944
- Disposition: All scrapped

The KUR EC4 class, later known as the EAR 54 class, was a class of 1,000 mm (3 ft 3 3/8 in) gauge 4-8-2+2-8-4 Garratt-type articulated steam locomotives developed under and for use in wartime conditions.

The seven members of the class were built during the latter stages of World War II by Beyer, Peacock & Co. in Manchester, England, for the War Department of the United Kingdom and the Kenya-Uganda Railway (KUR). They entered service on the KUR in 1944, and were later operated by the KUR's successor, the East African Railways (EAR).

== Class list ==
The builder's and fleet numbers of each member of the class were as follows:

Builder's number	WD number	First KUR number	Second KUR number	EAR number	Notes
7075	74418	89	100	5401	
7076	74419	90	101	5402	Last member of the class to be withdrawn from service
7077	74420	91	102	5403	
7078	74421	92	103	5404	
7079	74422	93	104	5405	
7080	74423	94	105	5406	
7081	74424	95	106	5407	

== See also ==
- Rail transport in Kenya
- Rail transport in Uganda
