= EC class =

EC class or Ec class may refer to:

- KUR EC class, 4-8-2+2-8-4 steam locomotives
- NZR EC class, electric locomotives
- WAGR Ec class, 4-6-2 steam locomotives
