= EAR 59 class =

Class of garratt steam locomotive

East African Railways 59 class
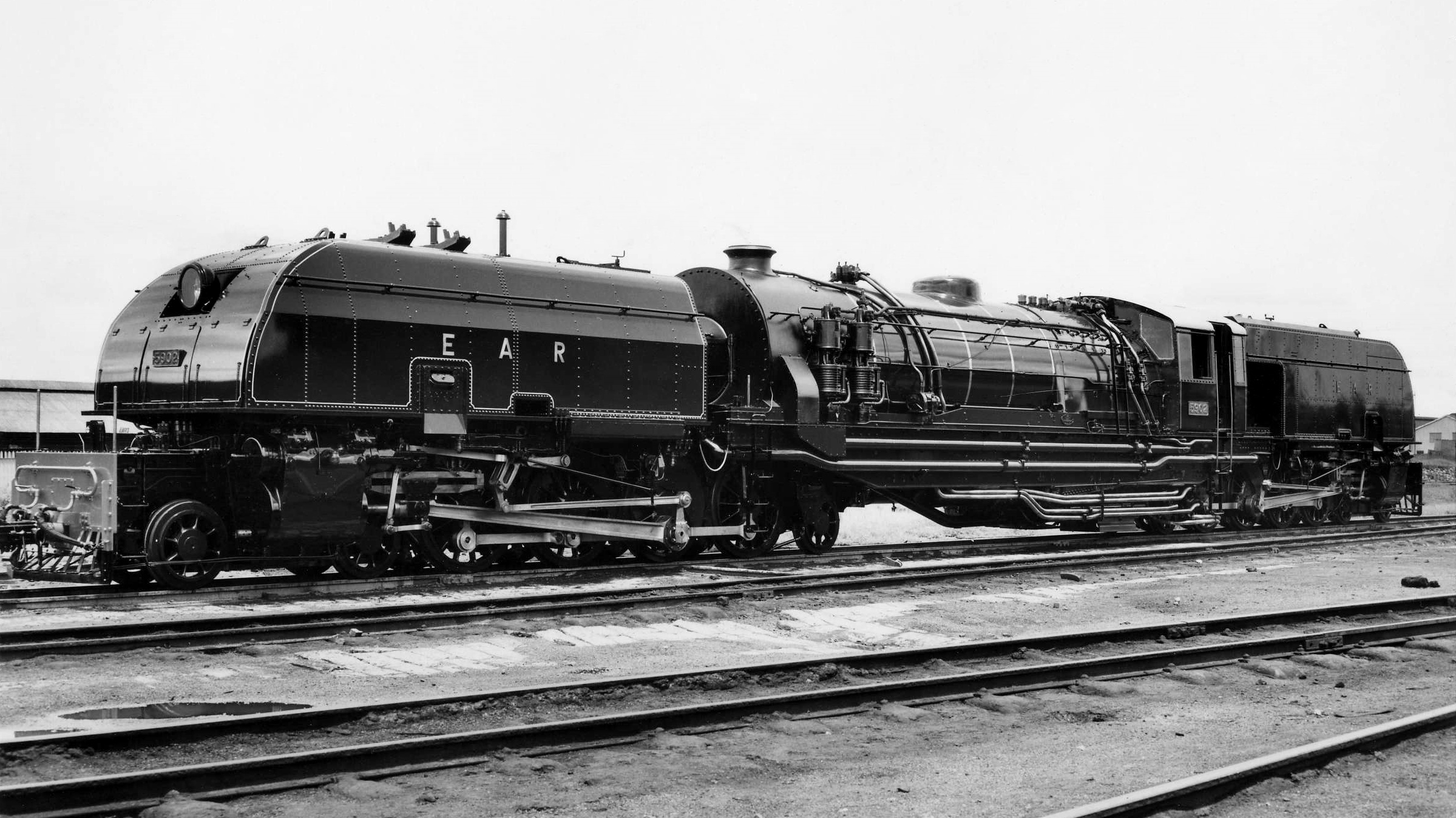
- 5902 prior to being named Ruwenzori Mountains
Type and origin
- Power type: Steam
- Builder: Beyer, Peacock and Company
- Order number: 11164, 11168
- Serial number: 7632–7658, 7700–7706
- Build date: 1955
- Total produced: 34
Specifications
- Configuration
  - Whyte: 4-8-2+2-8-4 Garratt
  - UIC: (2′D1′)(1′D2′) h4
- Gauge: 1,000 mm (3 ft 3 3/8 in)
- Driver dia.: 54 in (1,372 mm)
- Length: 102 ft 11 in (31.37 m)
- Adhesive weight: 157 long tons (160 t; 176 short tons)
- Loco weight: 248 long tons (252 t; 278 short tons)
- Firebox
  - Grate area: 72 sq ft (6.69 m^{2})
- Boiler: 225 psi (1.55 MPa)
- Heating surface: 3,560 sq ft (331 m^{2})
- Superheater
  - Heating area: 745 sq ft (69.2 m^{2})
- Cylinder size: 20.5 in × 28 in (521 mm × 711 mm)
Performance figures
- Maximum speed: 43 mph (69 km/h)
- Tractive effort: 83,350 lbf (370.76 kN)
Career
- Operators: East African Railways
- Class: 59
- Numbers: 5901–5934
- Withdrawn: 1973–1980
- Preserved: 5918, 5930

The EAR 59 class is a class of oil-fired 1,000 mm (3 ft 3 3/8 in) gauge 4-8-2+2-8-4 Garratt-type articulated steam locomotives. The 34 members of the class were built by Beyer, Peacock and Company in Manchester, England, for the East African Railways (EAR). They entered service in 1955–56, and were the largest, heaviest and most powerful steam locomotives to operate on any metre gauge railway in the world.

== Design and service history ==
The locomotives had a 4-8-2+2-8-4 wheel arrangement, weighed 252 t (248 long tons; 278 short tons), and delivered a tractive effort of 83,350 lbf (370.76 kN). They were designed to haul 1,200-ton trains on 1.5% gradients and were the mainstay of freight services on the 330 mi (530 km) run from Mombasa to Nairobi until the late 1970s.

During normal service, the locomotives were attended to by two regular crews on a 'caboose' basis, one working and one resting in a van with sleeping accommodation, changing over at eight-hour intervals.

The engines, many with Sikh drivers, were kept very clean and well maintained. The most famous of the 59 class was 5918 Mount Gelai with a devoted crew known as the 'Magnificent Foursome' who worked on it for 16 years. The two drivers, Kirpal Singh and Walter Pinto, simply went on holiday when the locomotive went into Nairobi works for scheduled maintenance.

According to railway photographer Colin Garratt (in 1975), "the overall condition of Mount Gelai is possibly unrivalled anywhere in the world today. Her cab interior is more akin to a Sikh temple than a locomotive footplate for its boiler face abounds in polished brasswork, embellished with mirrors, clocks, silver buckets and a linoleum floor".

Withdrawals started in 1973, with the last locomotive (Mount Gelai) removed from service in April 1980 when it was driven by its long time driver, Kirpal Singh directly to the Nairobi Railway Museum; Mr. Singh retired from railway service the same day. Together with Mount Gelai, Mount Shengena was also saved from scrap and both are now preserved by the Nairobi Railway Museum.

In August 2001, Mount Gelai was transferred from the Nairobi Railway Museum to the Kenya Railways' main works for an overhaul to working order. Between November 2001 and September 2005 the locomotive made three round trips to Mombasa hauling excursion trains. It was also used on at least one occasion to haul a freight train to Nairobi due to a shortage of diesel locomotives. However, it has not operated outside of Nairobi since 2005 and is unlikely to do so again due to operational restrictions and the partial regauging of Kenya's meter gauge (1,000 mm (3 ft 3 3/8 in)) rail lines to standard gauge (1,435 mm (4 ft 8 1/2 in)).

== In fiction ==
The 2018 Thomas & Friends special Big World! Big Adventures! introduced the character Kwaku, who is based on the EAR 59 class.

== Names ==
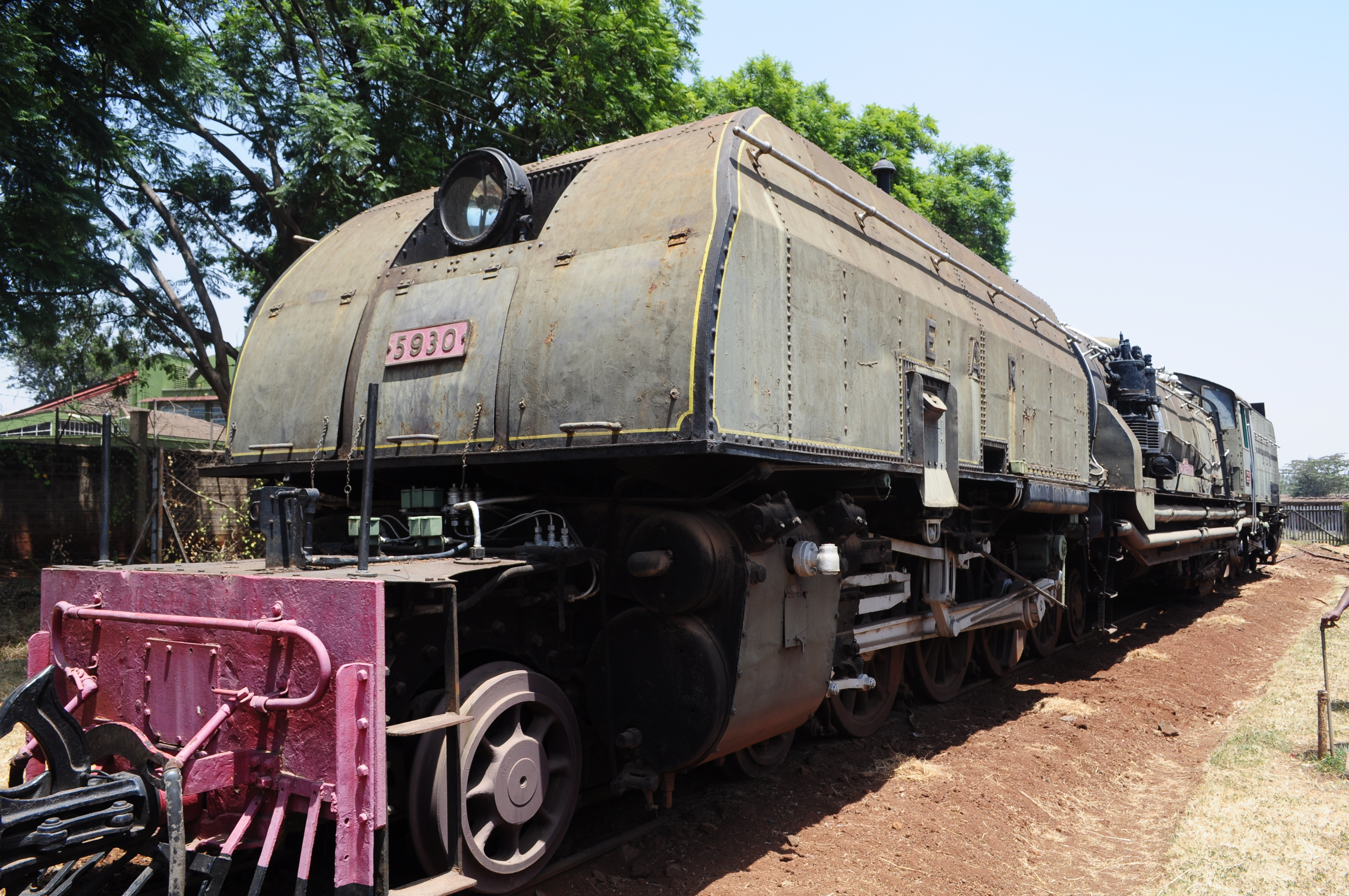
5930 Mount Shengena on display at the Nairobi Railway Museum

The locomotives were named after mountains in East Africa:

- 5901 Mount Kenya
- 5902 Ruwenzori Mountains
- 5903 Mount Meru
- 5904 Mount Elgon
- 5905 Mount Muhavura
- 5906 Mount Sattima
- 5907 Mount Kinangop
- 5908 Mount Loolmalasin
- 5909 Mount Mgahinga
- 5910 Mount Hanang
- 5911 Mount Sekerri
- 5912 Mount Oldeani
- 5913 Mount Debasien
- 5914 Mount Londiani
- 5915 Mount Mtorwi
- 5916 Mount Rungwe
- 5917 Mount Kitumbeine
- 5918 Mount Gelai - preserved at Nairobi Railway Museum
- 5919 Mount Lengai
- 5920 Mount Mbeya
- 5921 Mount Nyiru
- 5922 Mount Blackett
- 5923 Mount Longonot
- 5924 Mount Eburu
- 5925 Mount Monduli
- 5926 Mount Kimhandu
- 5927 Mount Tinderet
- 5928 Mount Kilimanjaro
- 5929 Mount Longido
- 5930 Mount Shengena - preserved at Uhuru Gardens
- 5931 Ulguru Mountains
- 5932 Ol'donyo Sabuk
- 5933 Mount Suswa
- 5934 Menengai Crater
