= KUR EC class =

Kenya-Uganda Railway EC class
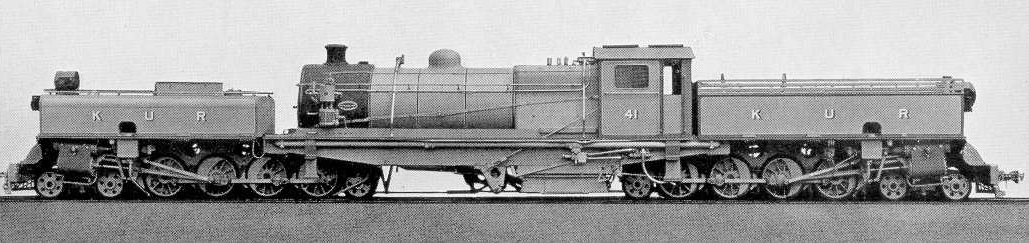
- Works photo of KUR EC no. 41
Type and origin
- Power type: Steam
- Builder: Beyer, Peacock & Co.
- Serial number: 6300–6303
- Build date: 1926
- Total produced: 4
Specifications
- Configuration
  - Whyte: 4-8-2+2-8-4 (Garratt)
  - UIC: (2′D1′)(1′D2′) h4
- Gauge: 1,000 mm (3 ft 3 3/8 in)
- Driver dia.: 43 in (1,092 mm)
- Adhesive weight: 79.4 long tons (80.7 t)
- Loco weight: 125.4 long tons (127.4 t)
- Fuel type: Eucalyptus wood; → Coal
- Fuel capacity: 6 long tons (6.1 t)
- Water cap.: 4,250 imp gal (19,300 L; 5,100 US gal)
- Firebox
  - Grate area: 43.6 sq ft (4.05 m^{2})
- Boiler pressure: 170 psi (1.17 MPa)
- Heating surface
  - Firebox: 174 sq ft (16.2 m^{2})
  - Tubes: 1,863 sq ft (173.1 m^{2})
  - Total surface: 2,417 sq ft (224.5 m^{2})
- Superheater
  - Type: Inside
  - Heating area: 380 sq ft (35 m^{2})
- Cylinders: 4 (Garratt)
- Cylinder size: 16.5 in × 22 in (419 mm × 559 mm)
- Valve gear: Walschaerts
- Loco brake: Westinghouse type
- Train brakes: Westinghouse type
Performance figures
- Tractive effort: 40,252 lbf (179.05 kN)
Career
- Operators: Kenya-Uganda Railway (KUR); → Indo-China
- Class: KUR: EC class
- Number in class: 4
- Numbers: KUR: 41–44; Indo-China: 201–204
- First run: 1926
- Withdrawn: KUR: August 1939; Indo-China: not known
- Disposition: Not known

The KUR EC class was a class of 1,000 mm (3 ft 3 3/8 in) gauge 4-8-2+2-8-4 Garratt-type articulated steam locomotives built by Beyer, Peacock & Co. in Manchester, England, for the Kenya-Uganda Railway (KUR).

== Background ==
In 1901, the rails laid for the KUR's predecessor, the Uganda Railway (UR), reached their final destination at Lake Victoria, and in 1903 construction of the associated buildings, tunnels bridges and viaducts was completed. By 1910, the UR had a critical requirement for further motive power, and that year, the UR's management ordered sixteen 0-6-6-0 Mallet-type articulated locomotives from the North British Locomotive Company.

After the Mallet locomotives entered service as the UR M class, they developed a poor reputation, due to mechanical problems and an excessive need for maintenance.

When a decision was made to order further new locomotives in 1926, the year the UR was renamed as the KUR, the railway committee therefore opted for Garratt-type engines instead. These were the first Garratts to be ordered and acquired by the railway, and were designated as the EC class.

== Design ==
The new Garratt locomotives were, in essence, two 4-8-2 Mountain-type engines facing back to back and powered by single boiler. By comparison with conventional rigid-chassis locomotives, they had an increased tractive effort combined with a light axle loading.

== Service history ==
The four members of the EC class entered service in 1926. A significant initial difficulty with them was that they were fired by Eucalyptus wood. When logs of Eucalyptus were thrown into a blazing EC class firebox, they virtually exploded. Firing a wood-burning EC class engine was therefore very inefficient, especially when it was working a heavy gradient. The KUR solved this problem by converting the EC class to burn coal instead of wood.

In other respects, the EC class's innovative configuration proved to be extremely successful. In 1928, the KUR therefore ordered 20 more Garratt locomotives, which became the KUR EC1 class.

After a relatively short career with the KUR, the EC class locomotives were sold, and exported to Indo-China in August 1939.

== See also ==
- Rail transport in Kenya
- Rail transport in Uganda
