= South Australian Railways 400 class =

Class of Australian 4-8-2+2-8-4 locomotives

South Australian Railways 400 class Beyer-Garratt articulated locomotive
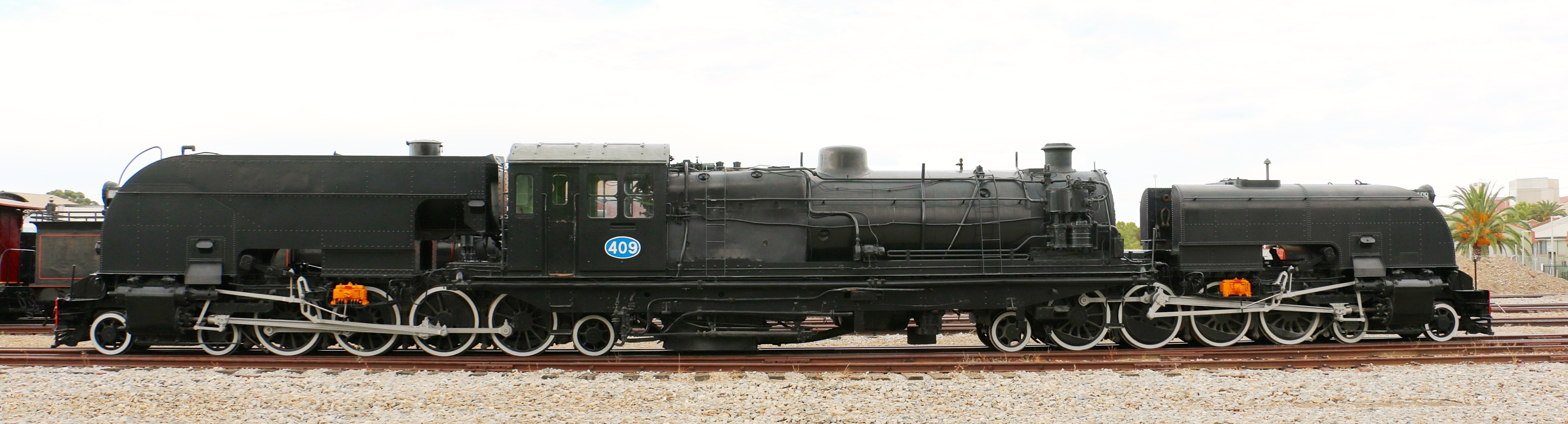
- Preserved Beyer-Garratt loco 409 at the National Railway Museum, Port Adelaide
Type and origin
- Power type: Steam
- Builder: Société Franco-Belge, Raismes, France under licence from Beyer, Peacock & Co. Ltd, Gorton, UK
- Serial number: Beyer, Peacock: 7622–7631; Franco-Belge: 2973–2982
- Build date: 1952–1953
- Total produced: 10
Specifications
- Configuration
  - Whyte: 4-8-2+2-8-4 (Garratt)
  - UIC: (2′D1′)(2′D1′) h4t
- Gauge: 3 ft 6 in (1,067 mm)
- Driver dia.: 4 ft 0 in (1.219 m)
- Length: 87 ft 5 in (26.64 m) over coupling points
- Adhesive weight: 84.900 long tons (86.262 tonnes; 95.088 short tons)
- Loco weight: 148.955 long tons (151.345 tonnes; 166.830 short tons)
- Fuel type: Oil
- Fuel capacity: 1,680 imperial gallons (2,018 US gal; 7,637 L)
- Water cap.: 3,700 imperial gallons (4,444 US gal; 16,821 L)
- Firebox
  - Grate area: 49 sq ft (4.6 m^{2})
- Boiler pressure: 200 psi (1,379 kPa)
- Heating surface: 1,970 sq ft (183 m^{2})
- Superheater
  - Heating area: 390 sq ft (36 m^{2})
- Cylinders: Four, outside
- Cylinder size: 16 in × 24 in (406 mm × 610 mm)
- Valve gear: Walschaerts
Performance figures
- Tractive effort: 43,520 lbf (193.6 kN)
- Factor of adh.: 4.37
Career
- Operators: South Australian Railways
- Numbers: 400–409
- First run: 1953
- Preserved: 2

The South Australian Railways 400 class comprised ten 4-8-2+2-8-4 articulated steam locomotives built in France in 1952 and 1953 under licence to Beyer, Peacock & Co. Ltd, Manchester, UK. The locomotives mainly hauled ore on the 1067 mm (3 ft 6 in) narrow-gauge line from the New South Wales/South Australia border to smelters at Port Pirie until 1963, when they were replaced by diesel locomotives. They also operated on the line to the break-of-gauge station at Terowie. Some locomotives were returned to service in 1969 while narrow gauge diesel locomotives were converted to 4 ft 8 1/2 in (1,435 mm) standard gauge. Subsequently, some were stored at Peterborough before being scrapped.

Two have been preserved, in static condition:

- No. 402 at the Zig Zag Railway, Lithgow
- No. 409 at the National Railway Museum, Port Adelaide.

Sound of a Beyer-Garratt locomotive
South Australian Railways 400 class Garratt loco starts off

== Gallery ==
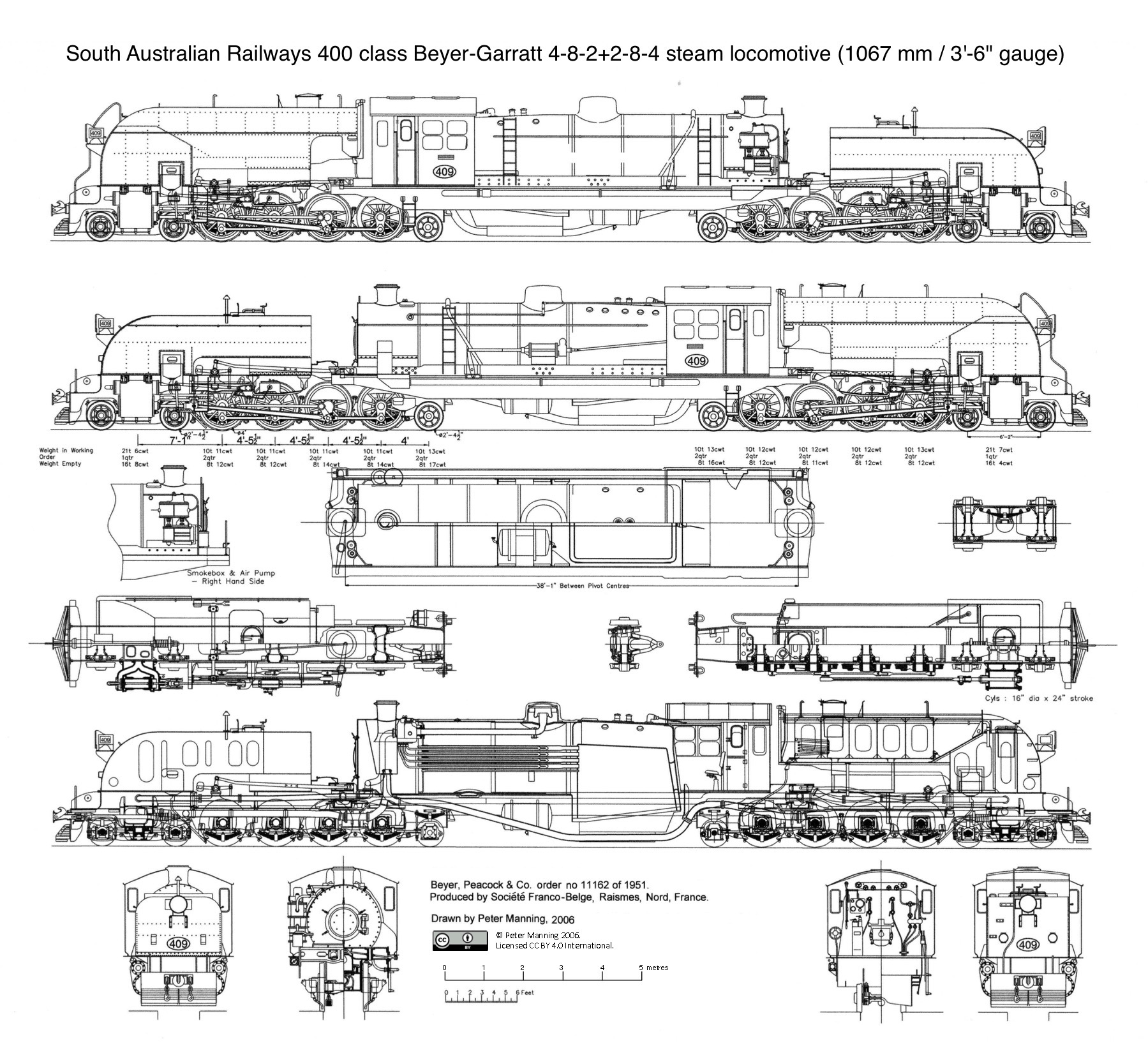
General arrangement of the 400 class Beyer-Garratt (click to enlarge)

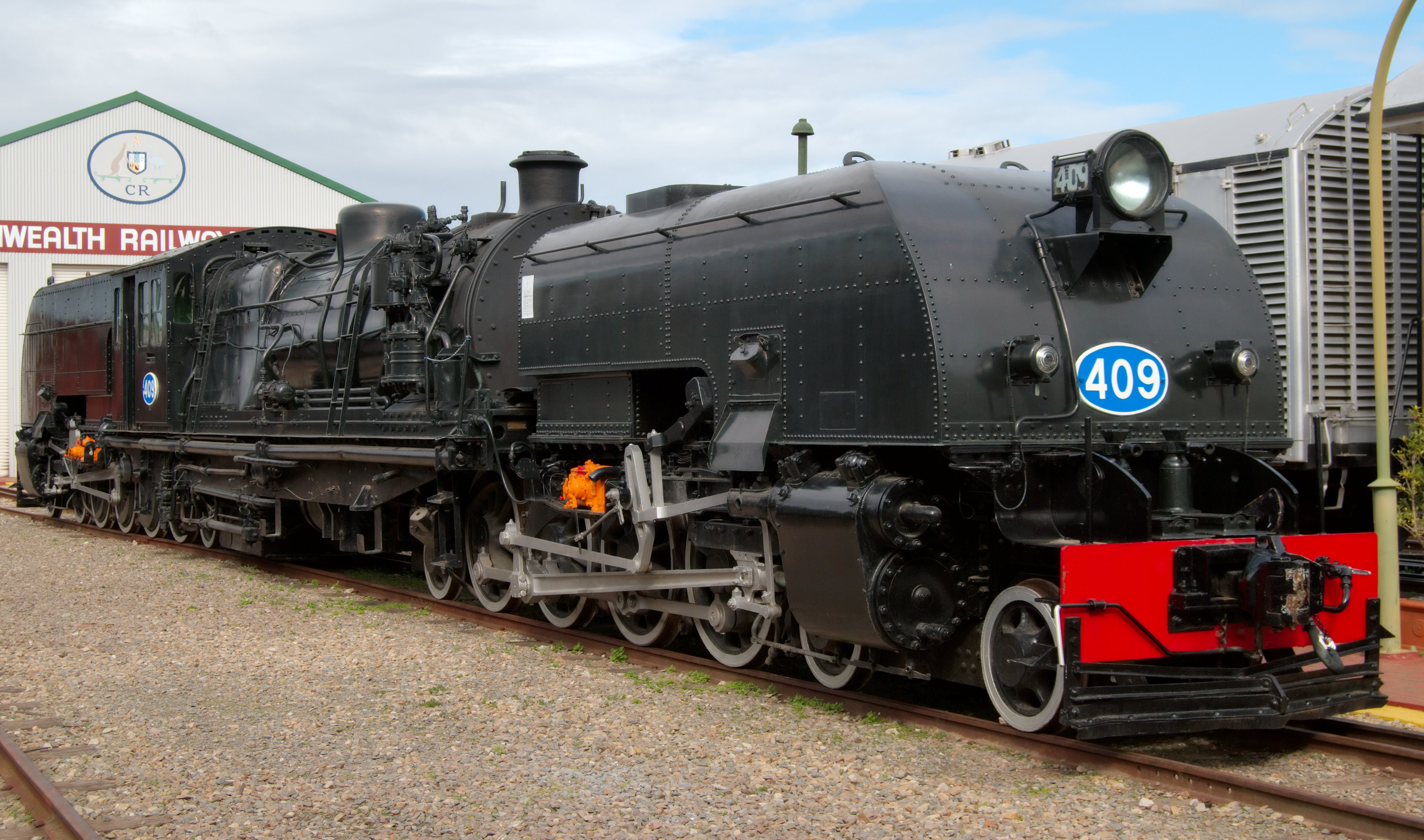
Preserved Garratt 409 at the National Railway Museum, Port Adelaide

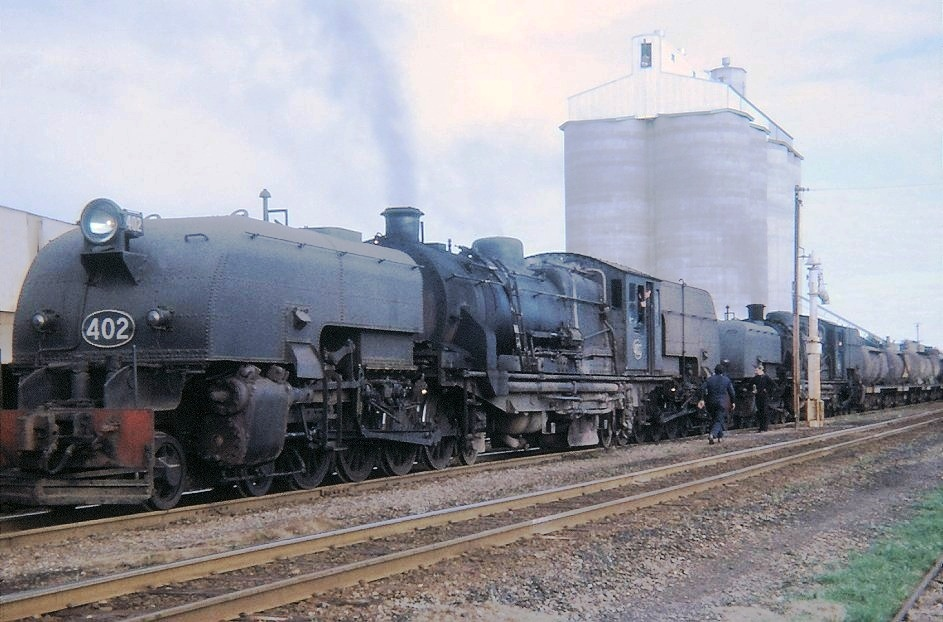
In 1968, Garratts 402 (leading) and 401 ready to depart Jamestown for Peterborough and the New South Wales border

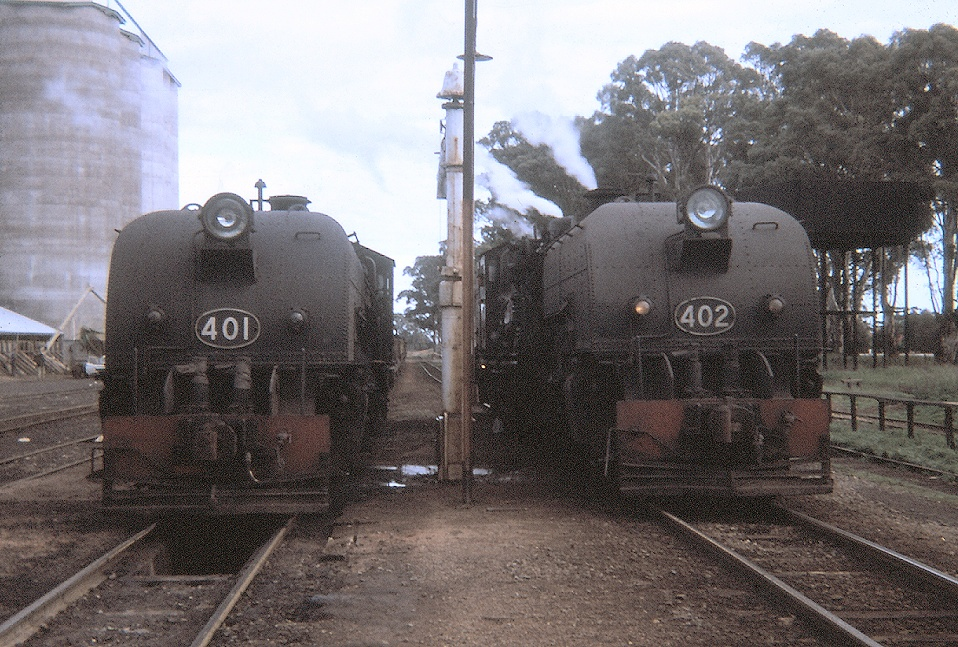
Garratts 402 and 401 at Jamestown in the late 1960s

== Select bibliography ==
- Durrant, A.E. (1987), Garratt locomotives of the world, Bracken Books, ISBN 1-85170-141-9
- Smith, J.D.H. (2009). "South Australian Railways steam locomotives".
- Oberg, Leon (2007), Locomotives of Australia: 1850s–2007, Rosenberg Publishing, pp. 271–272, ISBN 978-1877058547
