= South African Class GO 4-8-2+2-8-4 =

1954 articulated steam locomotive

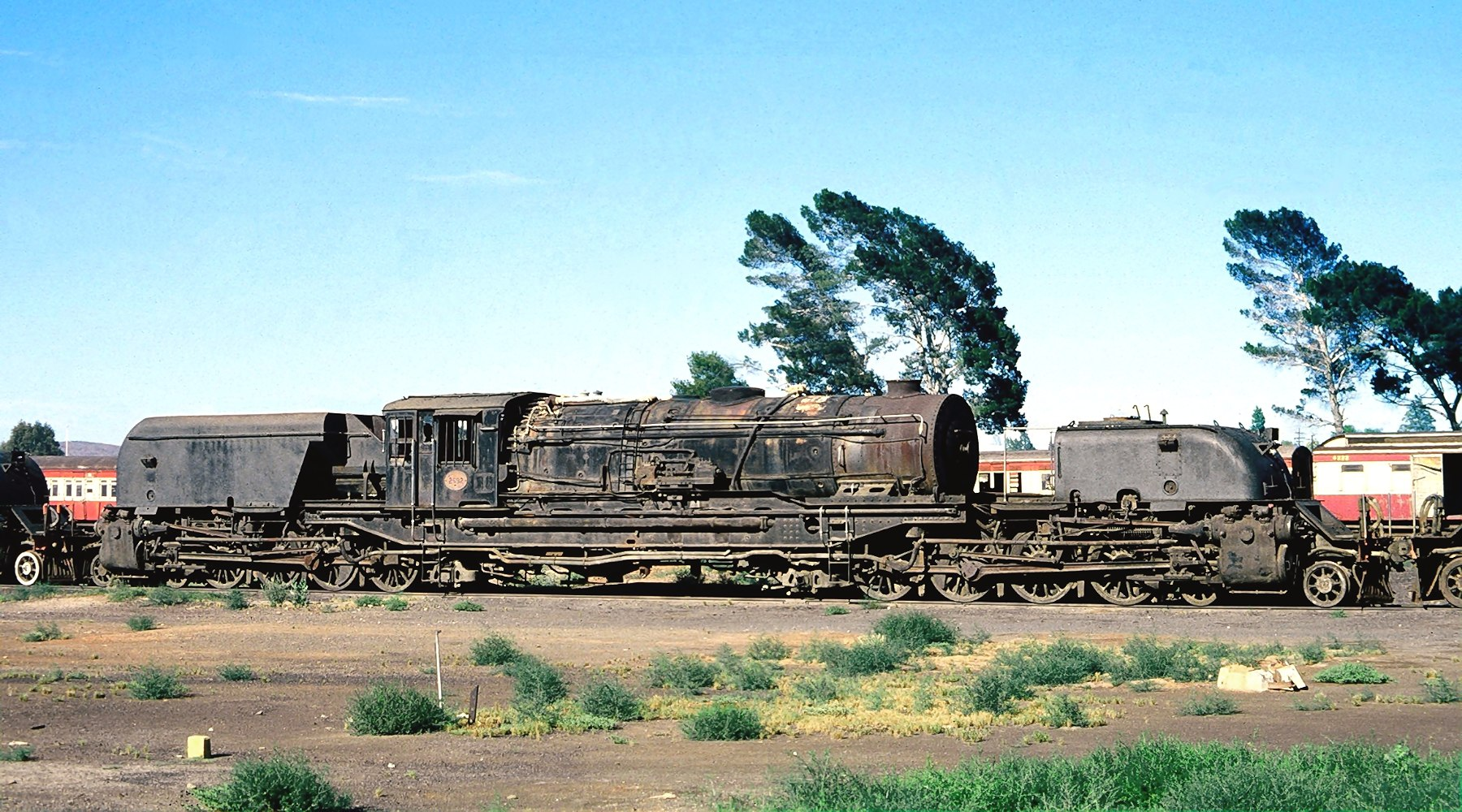
- No. 2592 staged at De Aar, 14 November 1979
Type and origin
- Power type: Steam
- Designer: South African Railways (L.C. Grubb)
- Builder: Henschel and Son
- Serial number: Henschel 28705-28729
- Model: Class GO
- Build date: 1953
- Total produced: 25
Specifications
- Configuration
  - Whyte: 4-8-2+2-8-4 (Double Mountain)
  - UIC: 2'D1'+1'D2'h4t
- Driver: 3rd & 6th coupled axles
- Gauge: 3 ft 6 in (1,067 mm) Cape gauge
- Leading dia.: 30 in (762 mm)
- Coupled dia.: 54 in (1,372 mm)
- Trailing dia.: 30 in (762 mm)
- Tender wheels: 34 in (864 mm)
- Minimum curve: 275 ft (84 m)
- Wheelbase: 86 ft 4 in (26,314 mm)
  - Axle spacing (Asymmetrical): 1-2: 4 ft 10 in (1,473 mm); 2-3: 4 ft 9 in (1,448 mm); 3-4: 4 ft 10 in (1,473 mm)
  - Engine: 30 ft 4 in (9,246 mm) each
  - Leading: 6 ft 10 in (2,083 mm) each
  - Coupled: 14 ft 5 in (4,394 mm) each
- Pivot centres: 45 ft (13,716 mm)
- Length
  - Over couplers: 93 ft 10 in (28,600 mm)
- Height: 13 ft (3,962 mm)
- Frame type: Cast
- Axle load: 13 LT 8 cwt (13,620 kg)
  - Leading: 20 LT 12 cwt (20,930 kg) front 20 LT 18 cwt (21,240 kg) rear
  - 1st coupled: 13 LT 7 cwt (13,560 kg)
  - 2nd coupled: 13 LT 7 cwt (13,560 kg)
  - 3rd coupled: 13 LT 6 cwt (13,510 kg)
  - 4th coupled: 13 LT 6 cwt (13,510 kg)
  - 5th coupled: 13 LT 7 cwt (13,560 kg)
  - 6th coupled: 13 LT 7 cwt (13,560 kg)
  - 7th coupled: 13 LT 8 cwt (13,620 kg)
  - 8th coupled: 13 LT 8 cwt (13,620 kg)
  - Trailing: 11 LT 18 cwt (12,090 kg) front 11 LT 18 cwt (12,090 kg) rear
  - Tender bogie: 24 LT 17 cwt 3 qtr (25,290 kg)
  - Tender axle: 12 LT 8 cwt 3 qtr (12,640 kg)
- Adhesive weight: 106 LT 16 cwt (108,500 kg)
- Loco weight: 172 LT 2 cwt (174,900 kg)
- Tender weight: 49 LT 15 cwt 3 qtr (50,590 kg)
- Total weight: 221 LT 17 cwt 3 qtr (225,400 kg)
- Tender type: X-17 (2-axle bogies); X-17, X-20 permitted
- Fuel type: Coal
- Fuel capacity: 11 LT (11.2 t)
- Water cap.: 1,660 imp gal (7,550 L) front
- Tender cap.: 6,815 imp gal (31,000 L)
- Firebox
  - Type: Round-top
  - Grate area: 56.6 sq ft (5.26 m^{2})
- Boiler
  - Pitch: 8 ft 9 1/2 in (2,680 mm)
  - Diameter: 6 ft 4 1/8 in (1,934 mm)
  - Tube plates: 13 ft 6 1/2 in (4,128 mm)
  - Small tubes: 241: 2 in (51 mm)
  - Large tubes: 36: 5 1/2 in (140 mm)
- Boiler pressure: 200 psi (1,379 kPa)
- Safety valve: Ross-pop
- Heating surface
  - Firebox: 200 sq ft (19 m^{2})
  - Tubes: 2,399 sq ft (222.9 m^{2})
  - Arch tubes: 26 sq ft (2.4 m^{2})
  - Total surface: 2,625 sq ft (243.9 m^{2})
- Superheater
  - Heating area: 546 sq ft (50.7 m^{2})
- Cylinders: Four
- Cylinder size: 18 1/2 in (470 mm) bore 26 in (660 mm) stroke
- Valve gear: Walschaerts
- Valve type: Piston
- Couplers: AAR knuckle
Performance figures
- Tractive effort: 49,430 lbf (219.9 kN) @ 75%
Career
- Operators: South African Railways
- Class: Class GO
- Number in class: 25
- Numbers: 2572–2596
- Delivered: 1954
- First run: 1954
- Withdrawn: 1977
- Scrapped: 1984

The South African Railways Class GO 4-8-2+2-8-4 of 1954 was an articulated steam locomotive.

In 1954, the South African Railways placed 25 Class GO light branch line tank-and-tender Garratt articulated steam locomotives with a 4-8-2+2-8-4 Double Mountain type wheel arrangement in service. It was the last new steam locomotive type to be acquired by the Railways.

== Manufacturer ==
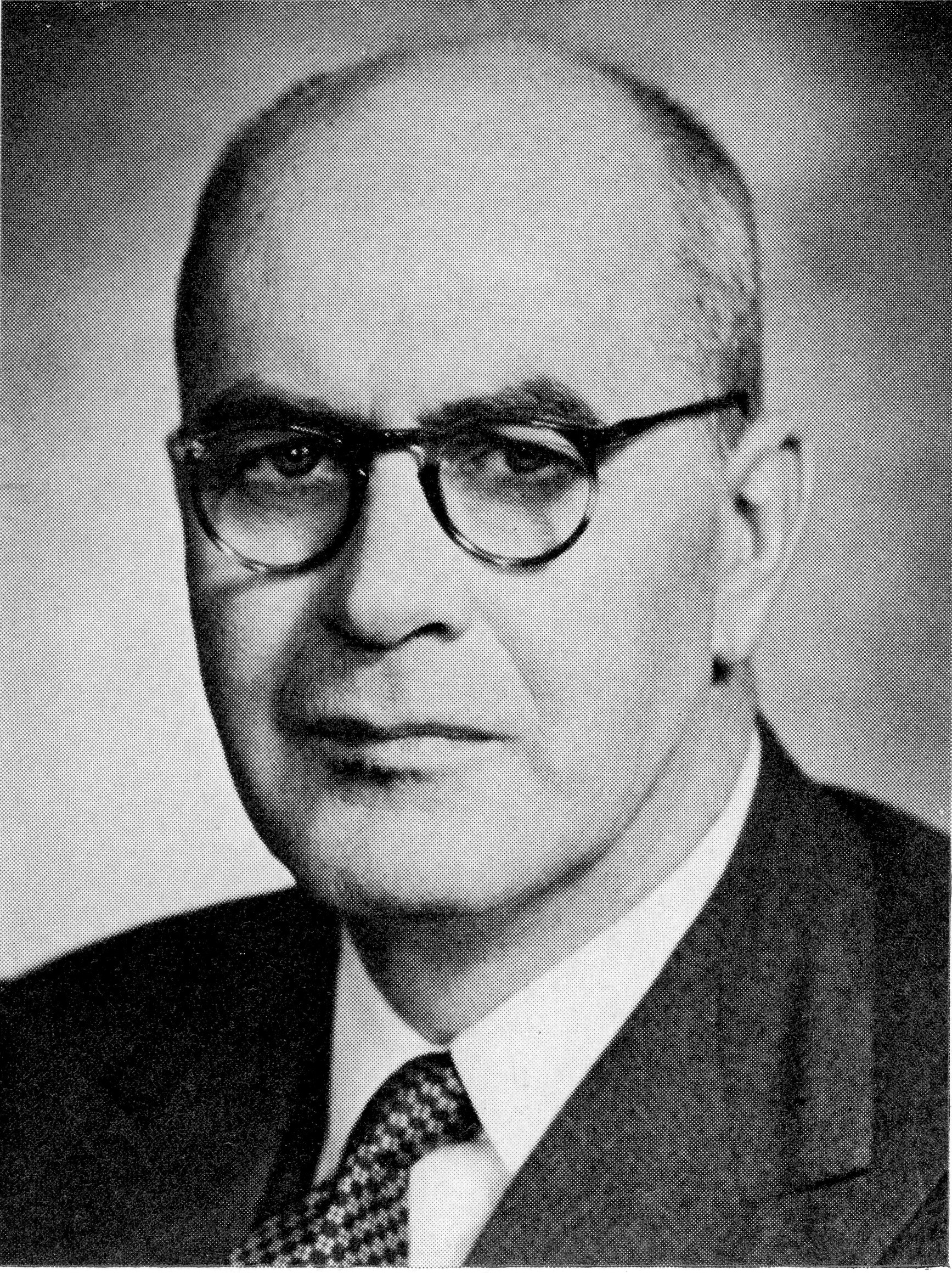
L.C. Grubb

The Class GO 4-8-2+2-8-4 tank-and-tender Garratt locomotive was designed to operate on lighter rails. The designs were prepared in 1952 under the supervision of L.C. Grubb, the Chief Mechanical Engineer (CME) of the SAR from 1949 to 1954, and an order for 25 of these locomotives was placed with Henschel and Son in Germany. Their construction immediately followed that of the first batch of the Class GMA Garratt, which was built by the same manufacturer.

They were built in 1953 and were delivered and placed in service in 1954, numbered in the range from 2572 to 2596. The Class GO turned out to be the last new steam locomotive type to be acquired by the Railways before full-scale electrification and dieselisation commenced. The Class 5E mainline electric locomotive entered service a year after the Class GO and the Class 31-000 diesel-electric locomotive followed in 1958.

== Characteristics ==
In design and general appearance, the Class GO was very similar to the Class GMA and many parts were interchangeable. It was also superheated, with a mechanical stoker, Walschaerts valve gear and piston valves, and was built on an identical one-piece cast steel frame with Franklin spring-loaded wedge horns, manufactured by Commonwealth Steel Castings Corporation in the United States of America. The chief differences were aimed at reducing weight, such as a smaller boiler with a reduced diameter, a smaller firebox and firegrate area and a half ton smaller capacity coal bunker.

The boiler was of telescopic construction with an inside diameter of 6 feet 2 3/4 inches (1,899 millimetres) at the first ring and 6 feet 4 1/8 inches (1,934 millimetres) at the firebox end. As a result of the smaller diameter boiler, the Class GO had a slightly longer chimney than the Class GMA. On the coal bunker, the reduced capacity involved altering the inverted "L" front end profile of the Class GMA bunker to a "\" profile on the Class GO bunker, as well as lowering the bunker height from more or less in line with the cab roof on the Class GMA to somewhat below the cab roofline on the Class GO.

The engine units were identical to those of the Class GMA, except that the cylinders were lined and sleeved to reduce the bore from 20 1/2 to 18 1/2 inches (521 to 470 millimetres) to suit the smaller boiler. This resulted in a correspondingly reduced tractive effort, from 60,700 to 49,430 pounds-force (270.0 to 219.9 kilonewtons) at 75% of boiler pressure. It also had roller bearing axle boxes on all wheels, but not on the crank-pins, with cannon boxes on all axles, except those of the inner Bissel trucks which had outside bearings. It had mechanical lubrication throughout, self-adjusting pivots, a U-shaped foundation ring welded to the inner and outer firebox bottom edges, and an all-welded firebox. The engine units also had Commonwealth cast steel type frames.

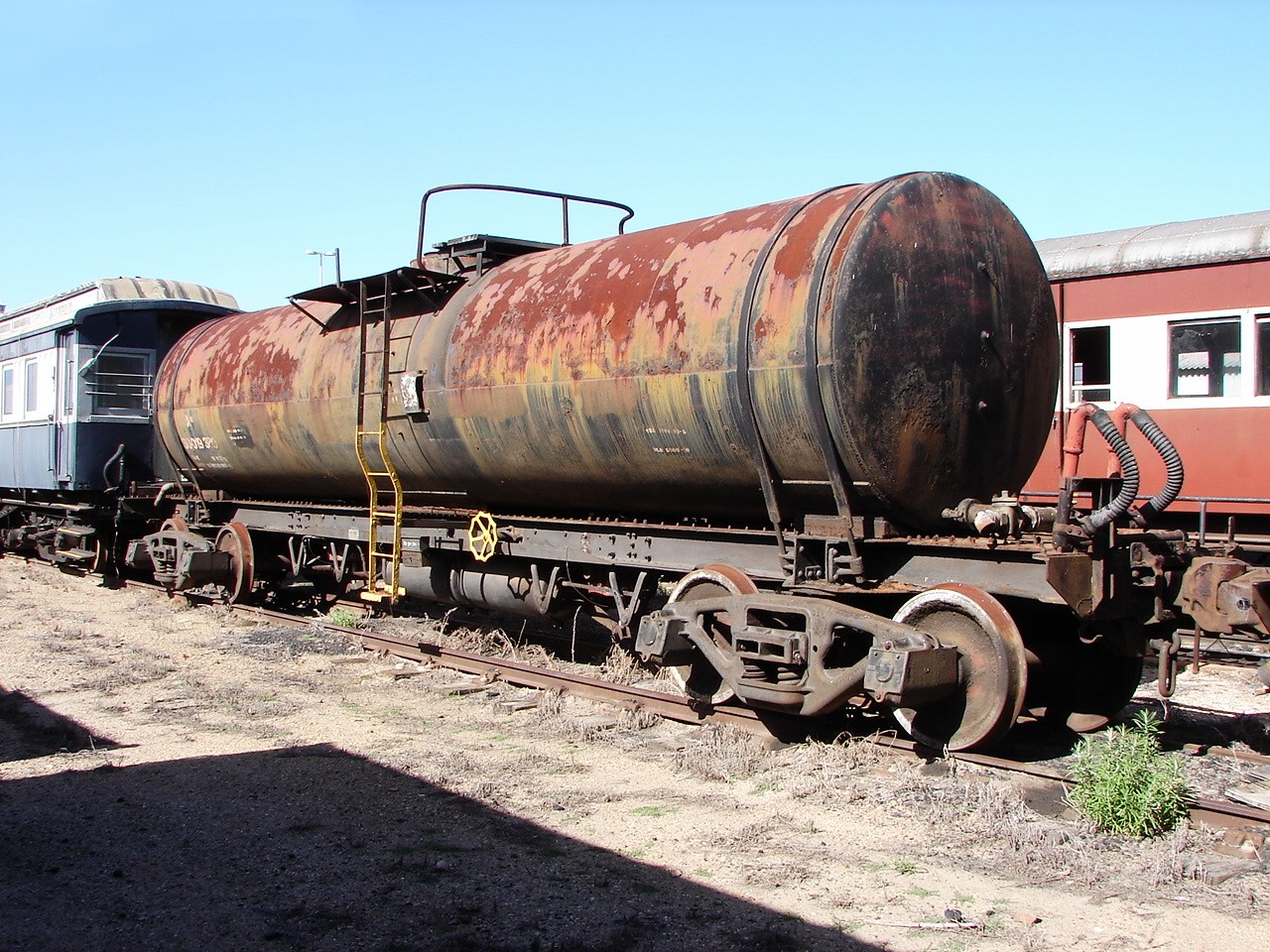
Type X-17 water tender

Like the Classes GM and GMA, the Class GO was a tank-and-tender Garratt. As was done with the Class GM and Class GMA, the Class GO carried water only in its front tank, while the rear bunker carried only coal. The meagre water supply was augmented by semi-permanently coupling a purpose-built Type X-17 water tender with a capacity of 6,815 imperial gallons (31,000 litres) to the locomotive. The Class GO and the first batch of the Class GMA were both equipped with the second version of the Type X-17 water tender which was built in 1953. The tenders were numbered for their engines and were painted black with red buffer beams.

To minimise rail stress, coupled wheel balancing was arranged to limit the hammer blow effect to a maximum of one ton per wheel at 45 miles per hour (72 kilometres per hour). The result was a locomotive with a maximum axle load of 13 long tons 8 hundredweight (13,620 kilograms) which could operate on 45 pounds per yard (22 kilograms per metre) rails. It could negotiate curves of 275 feet (84 metres) radius with a gauge widening of not more than 3/4 inch (19 millimetres) and a superelevation of 4 1/2 inches (114 millimetres).

The most obvious visible differences between the Class GMA and Class GO were their coal bunker front ends, with the inverted "L" profile of the Class GMA and the "\" profile of the Class GO, and the longer chimney of the Class GO. On both locomotives, the engines for their mechanical stokers were situated in the cutout on the front or cabside ends of their coal bunkers, but on the right or driver's side on the Class GMA and on the left or stoker's side on the Class GO.

== Service ==
Upon delivery, they were briefly put on trials on the line from Krugersdorp to Zeerust, after which they were relocated to the line from Belfast to Steelpoort in the Eastern Transvaal, shedded at Lydenburg. This is one of the toughest lines on the SAR with a ruling gradient of 1 in 33 (3%), which climbs in 95 miles (153 kilometres) from a nadir at an altitude of 2,427 feet (740 metres) to the summit at Nederhorst at 6,875 feet (2,096 metres), the highest point on the SAR.

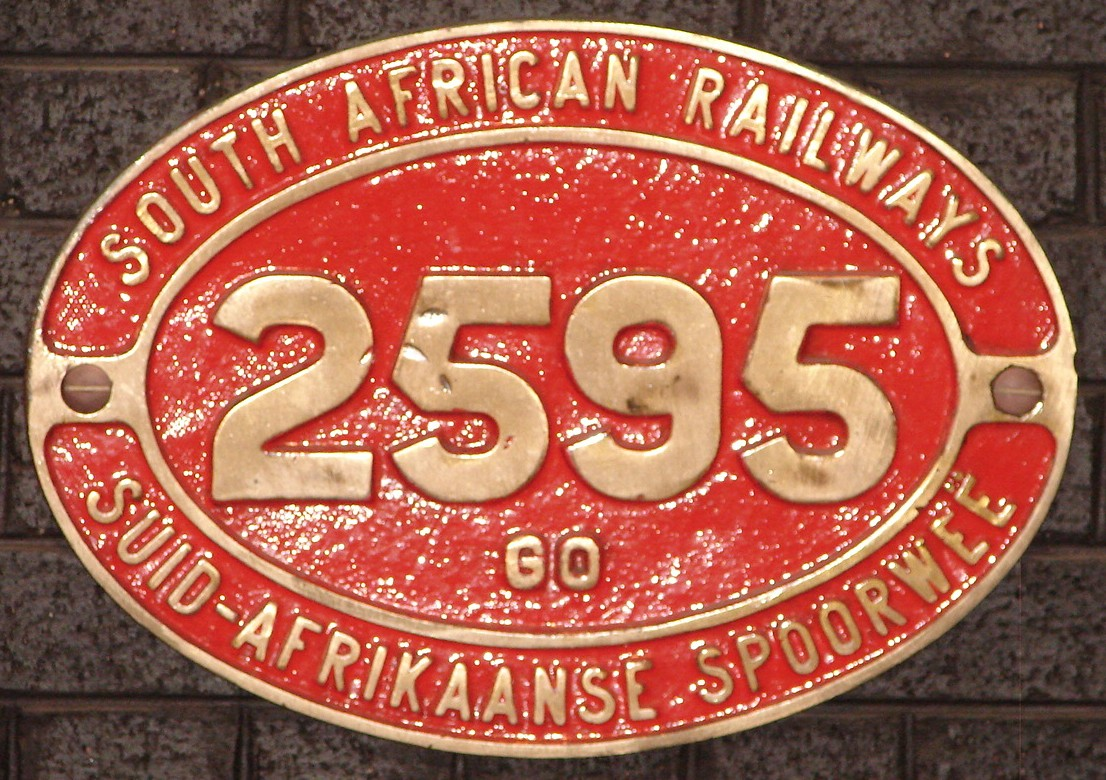

When the Steelpoort line was dieselised in 1972, the locomotives went to work on the branch line from Umtata to Amabele in Transkei and on the Greytown branch line out of Pietermaritzburg in Natal. They were unpopular in Transkei, however, being too small to replace two Class 14CRB locomotives, while their coupled wheelbase per engine unit was longer than that of the Class 14CRB and therefore took less kindly to the sharp curves at the Kei River crossing.

As a result, the Transkei locomotives were soon also relocated to Natal, where most of them ended up on the North Coast line, shedded at Stanger, Empangeni and Gingindlovu. From Empangeni, they also worked the line to Golela on the Swaziland border and they also served briefly on the Eshowe and Nkwalini branch lines. They were soon withdrawn from the Eshowe branch, however, as a result of their tendency to start fires while climbing the 1 in 30 (3⅓%) gradients through sugar cane fields.

Like the Class GMA, the Class GO was a successful locomotive which gave good service. However, after they were displaced by diesel-electric locomotives, the whole Class was relocated to De Aar in 1977, where the locomotives spent seven years standing idle before they were abruptly all written off in 1984 after only 22 years of actual revenue service. None were sold into industrial service.

== Preservation ==
Of the Class GO, only one survived into preservation. By 2018

Number	Works nmr	THF / Private	Leaselend / Owner	Current Location	Outside SOUTH AFRICA	?
2575	Hensc 28705	THF	Transnet Heritage Foundation	Outiniqua Transport Museum		

== Illustration ==
The main picture shows no. 2592 staged at the De Aar loco depot in 1979. The only preserved Class GO locomotive is no. 2575 which is on display at the Outeniqua Transport Museum in George.

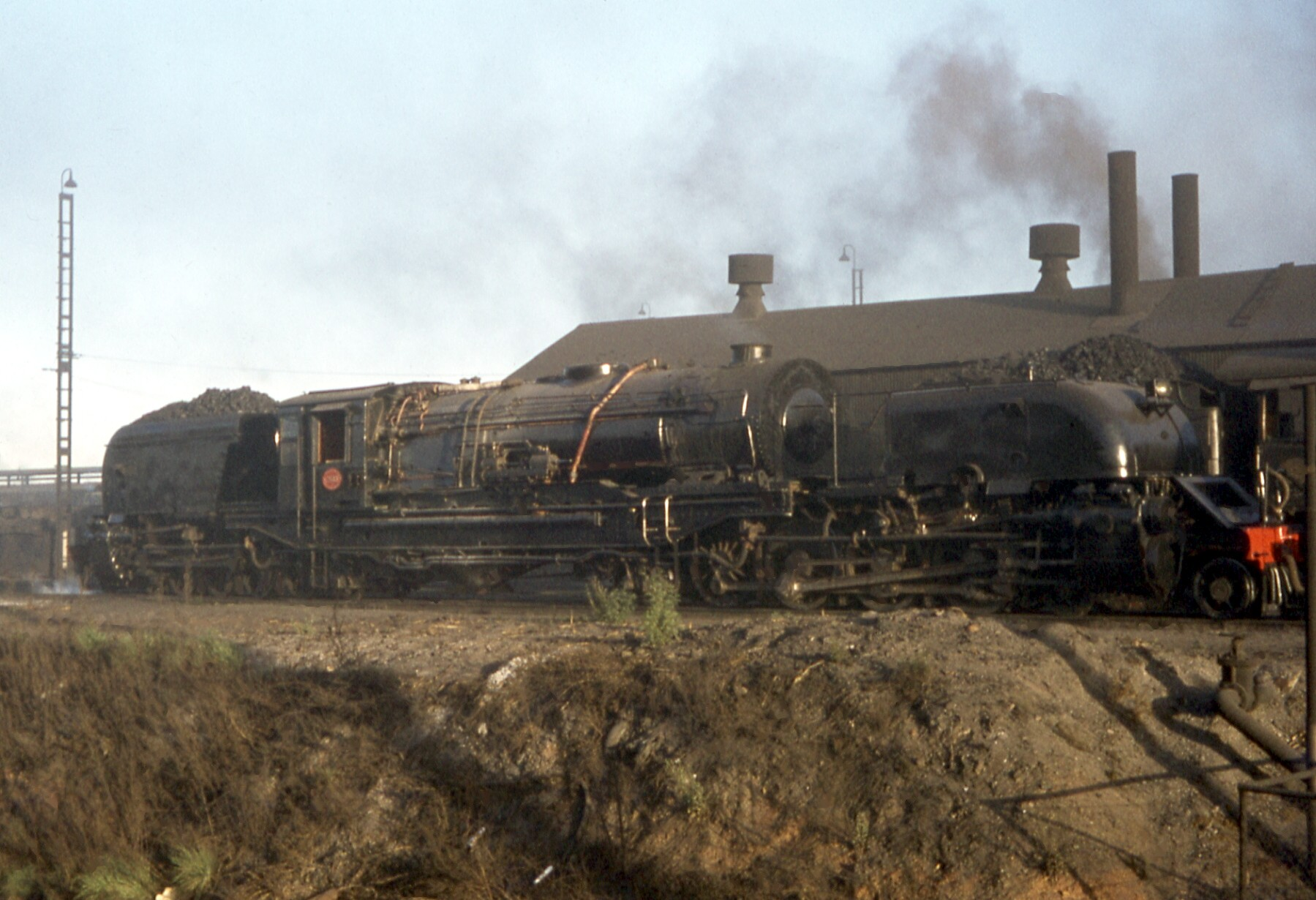
No. 2583 at Germiston Shed, 16 September 1973

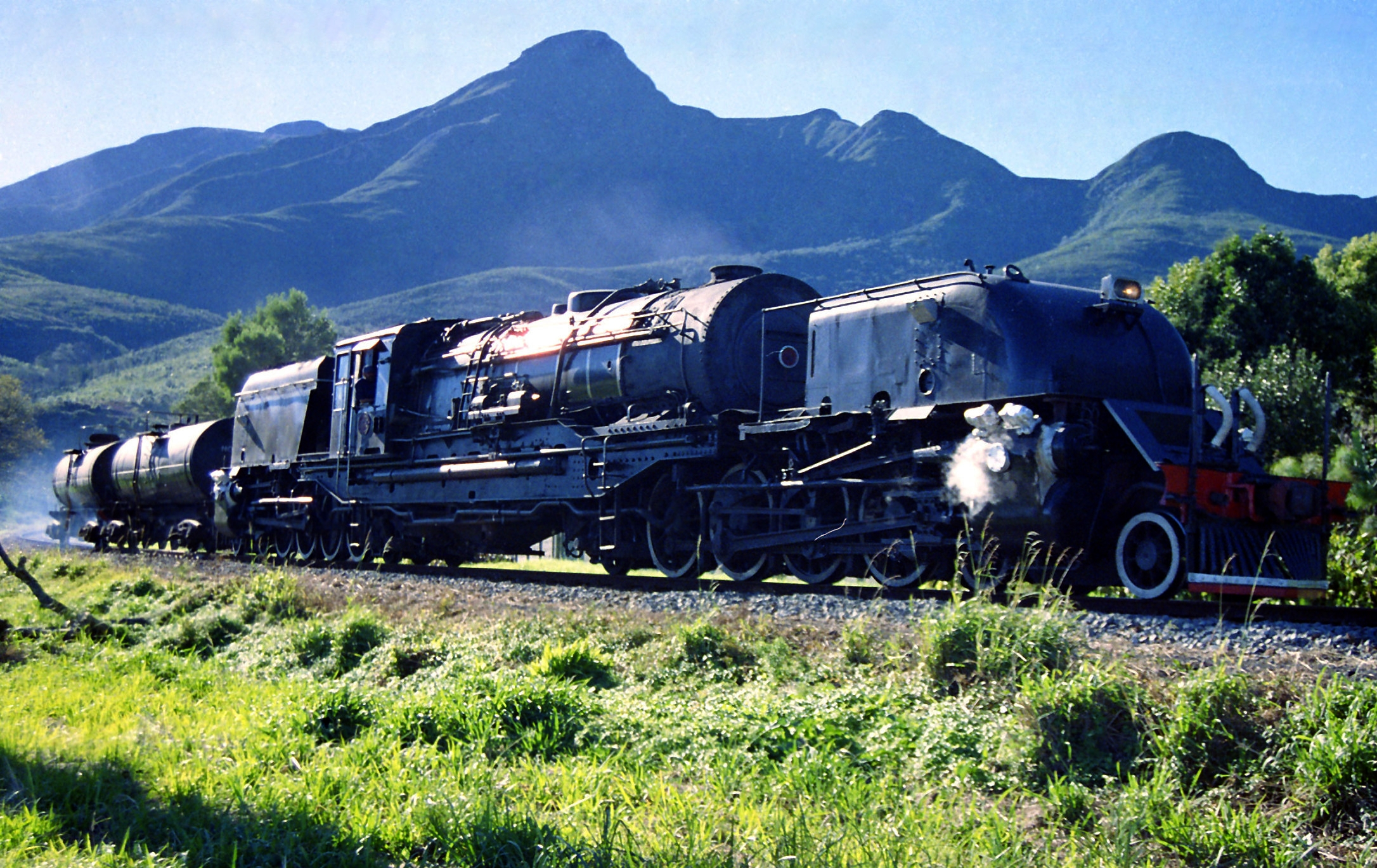
No. 2575 on an excursion trip, George, 30 May 2005

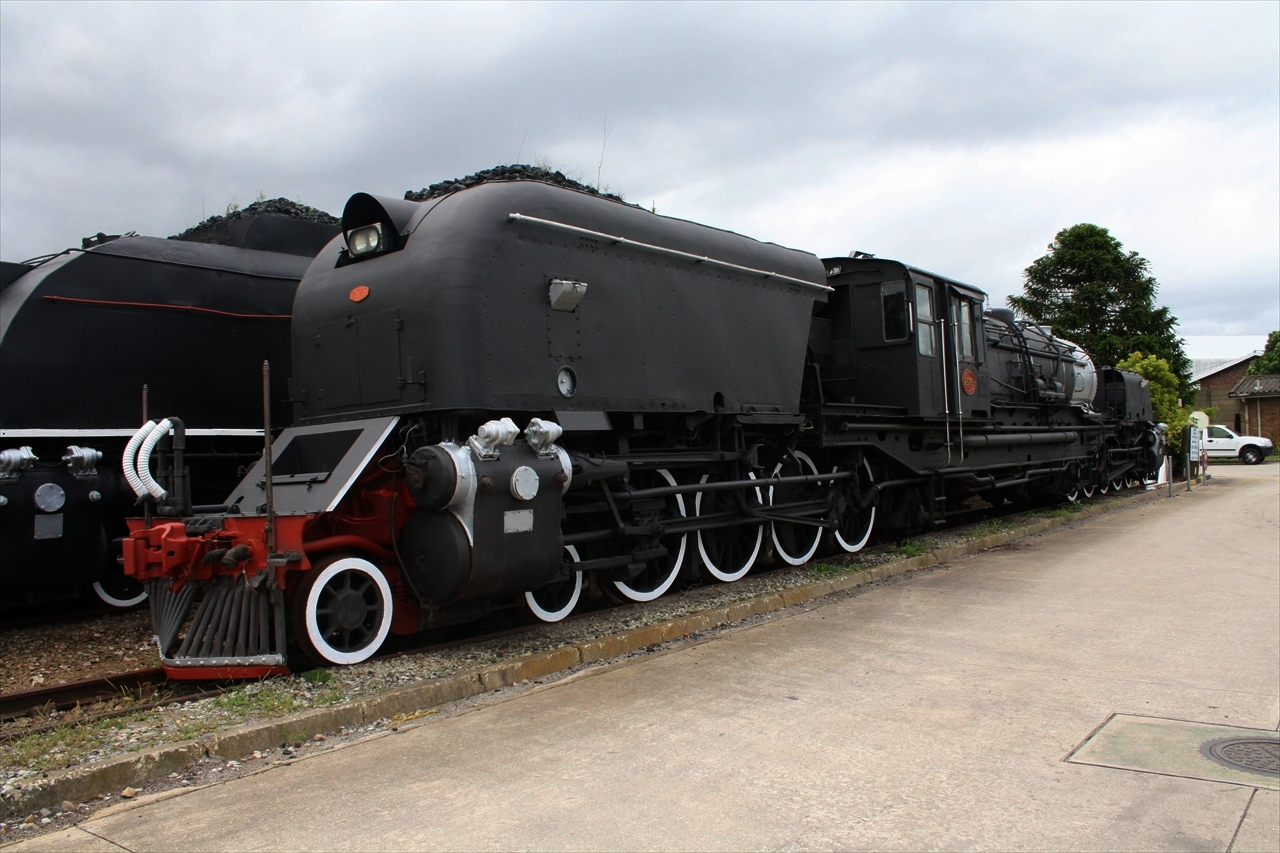
No. 2575 at the Outeniqua Transport Museum, 26 August 2012
