= BNR class P =

BNR Class P
Type and origin
- Power type: Steam
- Builder: Beyer, Peacock & Company
- Serial number: 6931–6934
- Build date: 1939
- Total produced: 4
Specifications
- Configuration
  - Whyte: 4-8-2+2-8-4 Garratt
  - UIC: (2′D1′)(2′D1′) h4t
- Gauge: 5 ft 6 in (1,676 mm)
- Driver dia.: 4 ft 8 in (1.422 m)
- Axle load: 17 long tons (17 t)
- Loco weight: 230 long tons (230 t)
- Fuel type: Coal
- Fuel capacity: 10 long tons (10 t)
- Water cap.: 7,500 imp gal (34,000 L; 9,000 US gal)
- Firebox
  - Grate area: 70 sq ft (6.5 m^{2})
- Boiler pressure: 210 psi (1.45 MPa)
- Superheater
  - Heating area: 661 sq ft (61.4 m^{2})
- Cylinders: Four, outside
- Cylinder size: 20 1/2 in × 26 in (521 mm × 660 mm)
Performance figures
- Tractive effort: 69,655 lbf (309.84 kN)
Career
- Operators: Bengal Nagpur Railway; →Indian Railways
- Numbers: BNR: 855–858; →IR: 38855–38858
- Locale: East Central Railway zone
- First run: 1939
- Disposition: Scrapped

The Bengal Nagpur Railway class P was a class of four 4-8-2+2-8-4 (“Double Mountain”) Garratt locomotives. It was developed from BNR class N and BNR class NM. The Anuppur-Chirmiri section had severe curves and it needed an engine with a trailing bogie. Its boiler was slightly enlarged similar to the NM.

It could haul 1,500 long tons (1,500 t) load up a 1 in 91 gradient.

== Technical specifications ==
Boiler diameter	7 ft 1 13/16 in (2.180 m)
Heating area in firebox	330 sq ft (31 m^{2})
Boiler area	3,120 sq ft (290 m^{2})
Adhesive weight	136 tonnes
Maximum train load	3165 tonnes on level track
