= EAR 13 class =

East African Railways steam locomotive

East African Railways 13 class
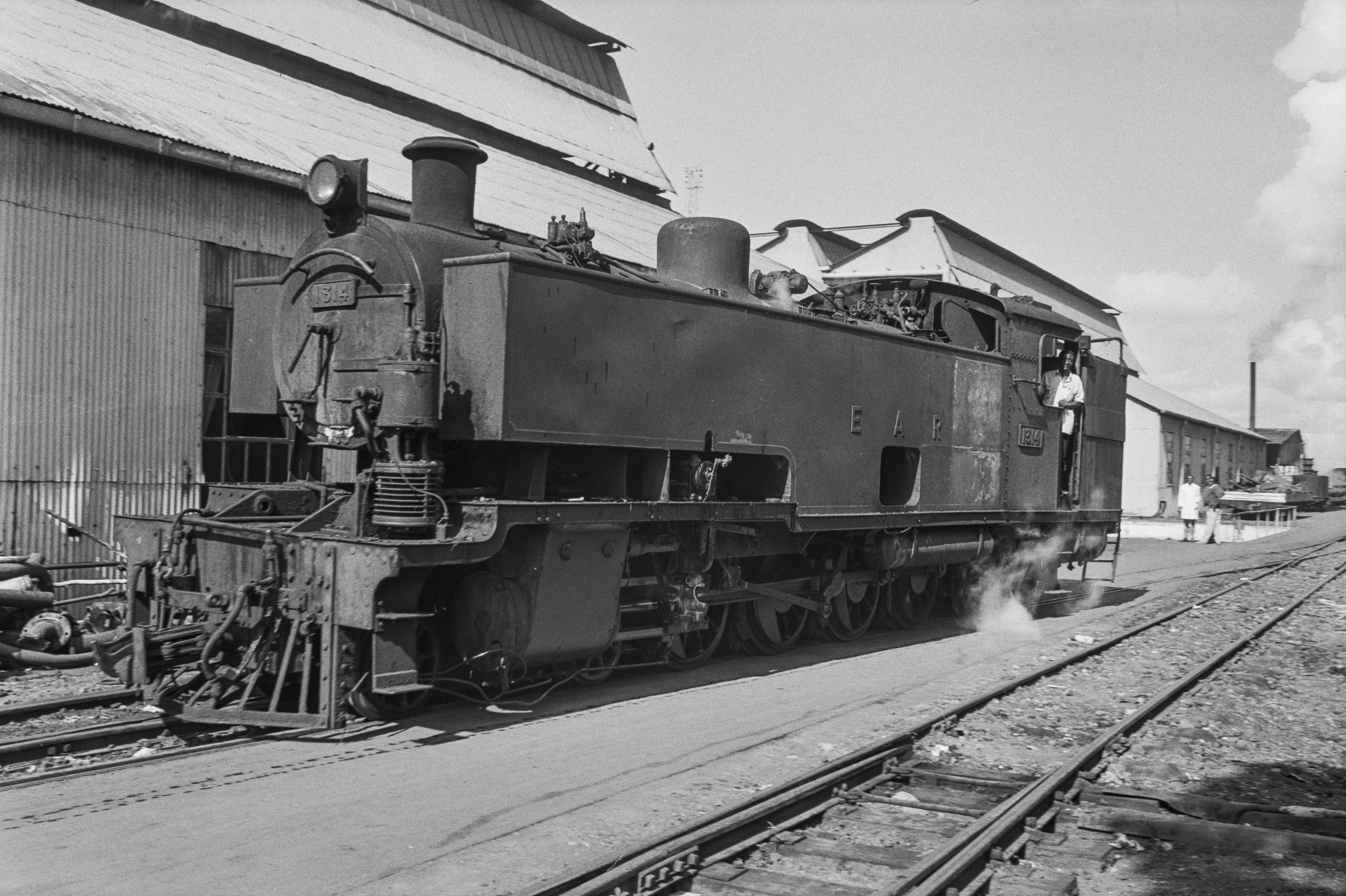
Type and origin
- Power type: Steam
- Builder: North British Locomotive Company
- Serial number: 27060–27077
- Build date: 1952
- Total produced: 18
Specifications
- Configuration
  - Whyte: 4-8-2T; (later 4-8-4T)
- Gauge: 1,000 mm (3 ft 3 3/8 in)

The EAR 13 class was a class of 1,000 mm (3 ft 3 3/8 in) gauge 4-8-2T steam locomotives built by North British Locomotive Company in Glasgow, Scotland, for the East African Railways (EAR).

The 18 members of the class were built in 1952 and entered service in 1953. They were later converted into 4-8-4Ts, because of a tendency to de-rail when operating in reverse, using bogies (trucks) salvaged from EAR 50 class Garratt-type locomotives, which were then in the process of being withdrawn from service.

Class member 1315 was for many years an exhibit in the Nairobi Railway Museum. However, in 1996 after checking the boiler records of all the museum exhibits, the locomotive was removed from the Museum by Kenya Railways engineers who were in need of a replacement main works stationary boiler. The rest of the locomotive was then scrapped.

== See also ==
- History of rail transport in Tanzania
- Rail transport in Kenya
- Rail transport in Uganda
