= KUR EC1 class =

Class of steam locomotives

Kenya-Uganda Railway EC1 class; East African Railways 50/51 classes
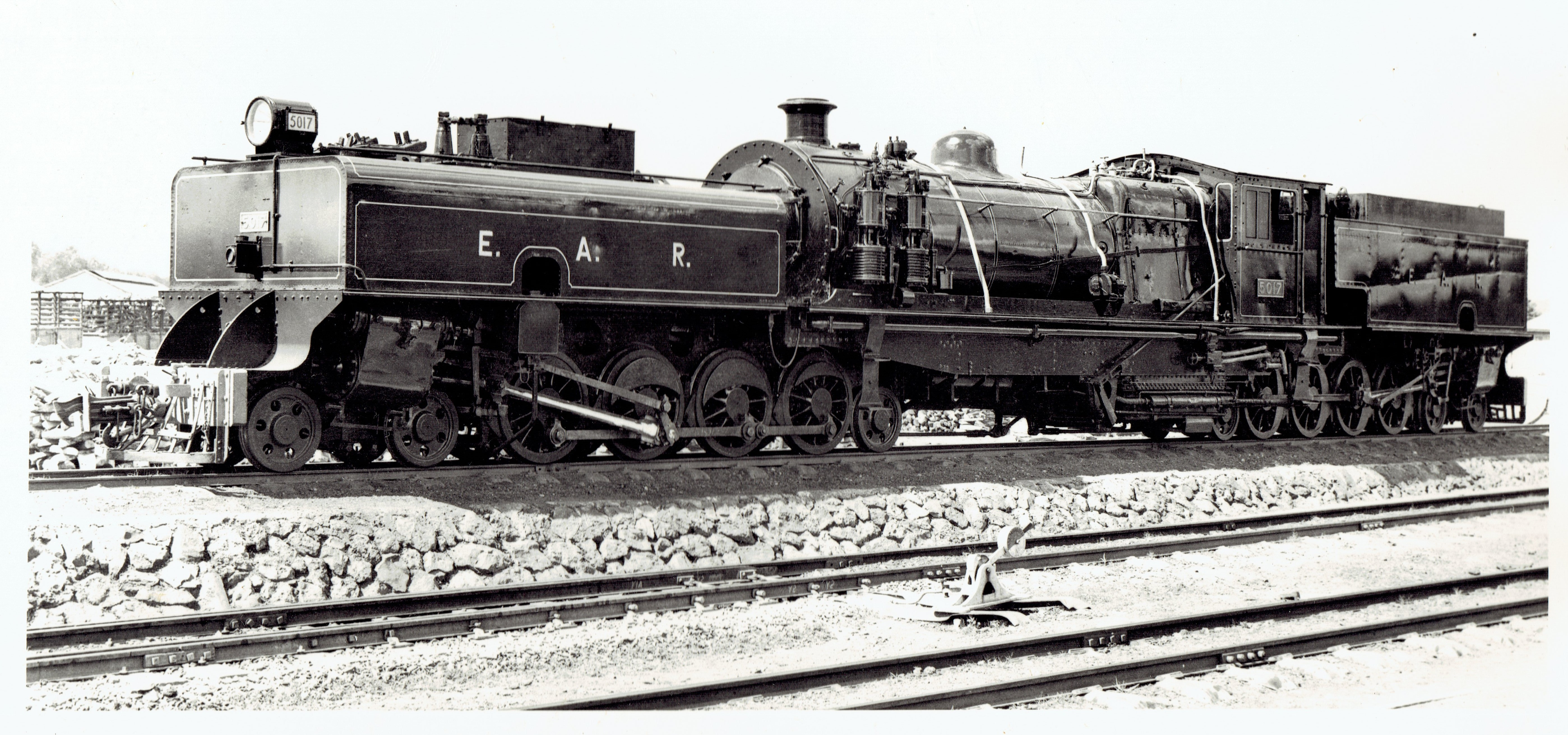
- East African Railways publicity photograph of no. 5017, c. 1953
Type and origin
- Power type: Steam
- Builder: Beyer, Peacock & Co.
- Serial number: 6429–6440, 6516–6523; 6637–6638
- Build date: 1927 (20), 1930 (2)
- Total produced: 22
Specifications
- Configuration
  - Whyte: 4-8-2+2-8-4 (Garratt)
  - UIC: (2′D1′)(1′D2′) h4
- Gauge: 1,000 mm (3 ft 3 3/8 in)
- Driver dia.: 43 in (1,092 mm)
- Adhesive weight: 83.9 long tons (85.2 t)
- Loco weight: 130.9 long tons (133.0 t)
- Fuel type: Coal
- Fuel capacity: 6 long tons (6.1 t)
- Water cap.: 5,250 imp gal (23,900 L; 6,300 US gal)
- Firebox
  - Grate area: 43.6 sq ft (4.05 m^{2})
- Boiler pressure: 170 psi (1.17 MPa)
- Heating surface
  - Firebox: 174 sq ft (16.2 m^{2})
  - Tubes: 1,863 sq ft (173.1 m^{2})
  - Total surface: 2,417 sq ft (224.5 m^{2})
- Superheater
  - Type: Inside
  - Heating area: 380 sq ft (35 m^{2})
- Cylinders: 4 (Garratt)
- Cylinder size: 16 1/2 in × 22 in (419 mm × 559 mm)
- Valve gear: Walschaerts
- Loco brake: Westinghouse type
- Train brakes: Westinghouse type
Performance figures
- Tractive effort: 40,255 lbf (179.06 kN)
Career
- Operators: Kenya-Uganda Railway (KUR); → East African Railways (EAR)
- Class: KUR: EC1 class; EAR: 50/51 classes
- Number in class: 22
- Numbers: KUR: 45–66; EAR: 5001–5018; 5101–5102
- First run: 1927

The KUR EC1 class, later known as the EAR 50 class and the EAR 51 class, was a class of 1,000 mm (3 ft 3 3/8 in) gauge 4-8-2+2-8-4 Garratt-type articulated steam locomotives operated by Kenya-Uganda Railway (KUR) and the East African Railways (EAR).

== Service history ==
The first twenty members of the class were built in 1927 by Beyer, Peacock & Co. in Manchester, England, for the KUR. They entered service in 1928, and, with two exceptions, were later operated by the KUR's successor, the EAR, as its 50 class.

The remaining two members of the EC1 class were built and entered service in 1930, and were different in some respects. They later became the EAR's 51 class.

All of the former EC1 class members were withdrawn from service in the 1950s. Most of their leading bogies (trucks) were salvaged for use in converting EAR 13 class locomotives from 4-8-2Ts to 4-8-4Ts, to address the 13 class's initial tendency to de-rail when operating in reverse.

== Class list ==
The builder's numbers, build years, fleet numbers and names of each member of the EC1 class were as follows:

Builder's number	Built	KUR number	EAR number	Name	Notes
6429	1928	45	5001		
5430	1928	46	5002		
6431	1928	47	5003	Toro	
6432	1928	48	5004	Masai	
6433	1928	49	5005	Nyanzi	
6434	1928	50	5006	Meru	
6435	1928	51	–		Sold to Indo-China as no. 205
6436	1928	52	5007	Masaka	
6437	1928	53	–		Sold to Indo-China as no. 206
6438	1928	54	5008	Nandi	
6439	1928	55	5009	Bunyoro	
6440	1928	56	5010		
6516	1928	57	5011	Kikuyu	
6517	1928	58	5012	Ankole	
6518	1928	59	5013		
6519	1928	60	5014		
6520	1928	61	5015		
6521	1928	62	5016	Londiani	
6522	1928	63	5017	Ukamba	
6523	1928	64	5018	Machakos	
6637	1930	65	5101	Laikipia	
6638	1930	66	5102		

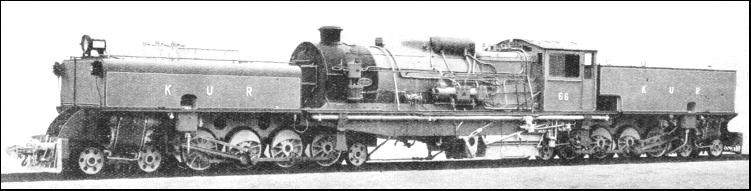
Works photo of KUR EC1 no. 66

== See also ==
- Rail transport in Kenya
- Rail transport in Uganda
