= KUR EC2 class =

Class of steam locomotives

Kenya-Uganda Railway EC2 class; East African Railways 52 class
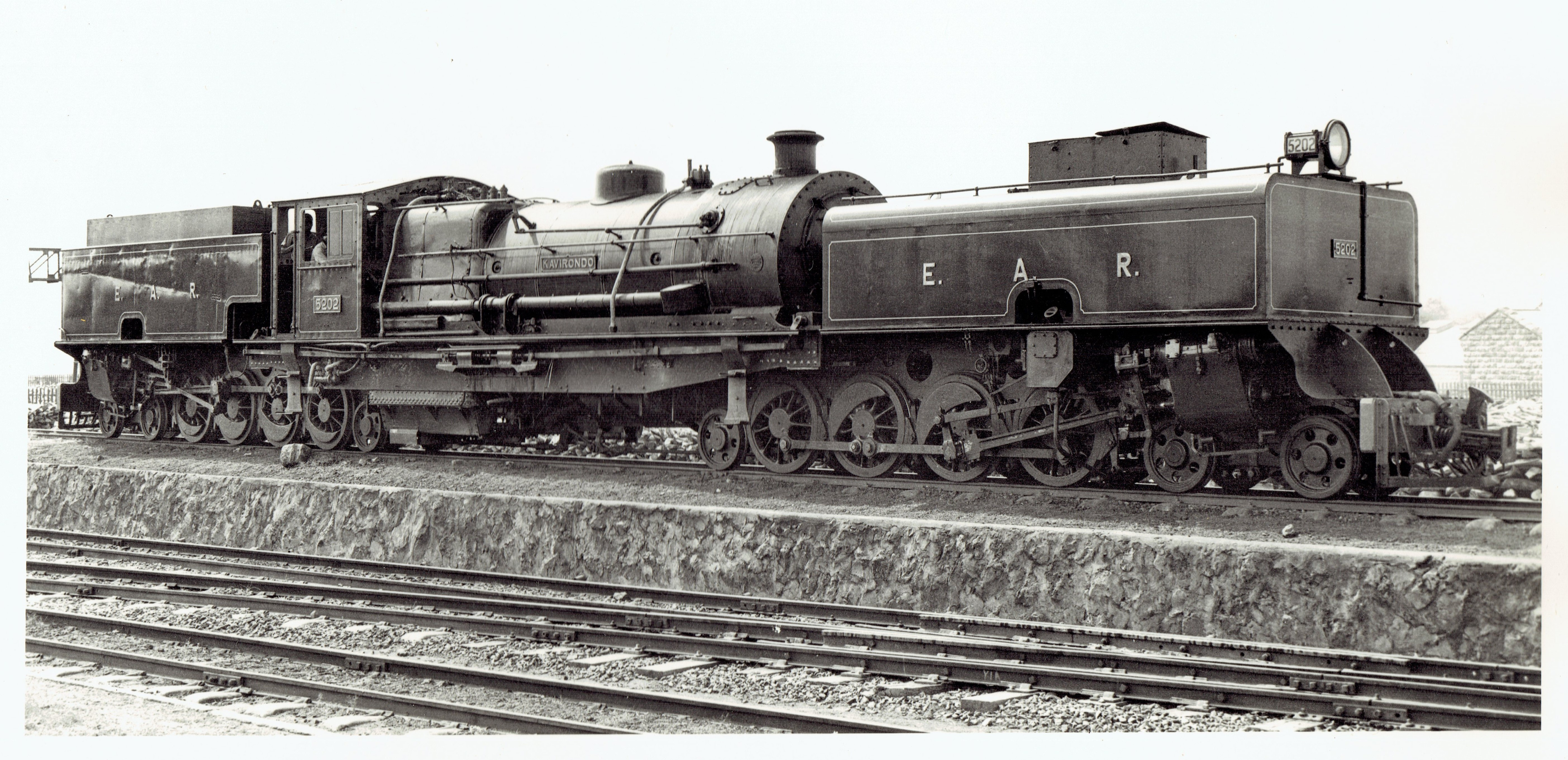
- East African Railways publicity photograph of no. 5202 Kavirondo, c. 1953
Type and origin
- Power type: Steam
- Builder: North British Locomotive Company
- Serial number: 24070–24079
- Build date: 1931
- Total produced: 10
Specifications
- Configuration
  - Whyte: 4-8-2+2-8-4 (Garratt)
  - UIC: (2′D1′)(1′D2′) h4
- Gauge: 1,000 mm (3 ft 3 3/8 in)
- Driver dia.: 43 in (1,092 mm)
- Adhesive weight: 88 long tons (89 t)
- Loco weight: 142.1 long tons (144.4 t)
- Fuel type: Oil
- Fuel capacity: 2,375 imp gal (10,800 L; 2,852 US gal)
- Water cap.: 5,250 imp gal (23,900 L; 6,300 US gal)
- Firebox
  - Grate area: 43.6 sq ft (4.05 m^{2})
- Boiler pressure: 170 psi (1.17 MPa); (180 psi (1.24 MPa))
- Heating surface
  - Firebox: 194 sq ft (18.0 m^{2})
  - Tubes: 1,856 sq ft (172.4 m^{2})
  - Total surface: 2,430 sq ft (226 m^{2})
- Superheater
  - Type: Inside
  - Heating area: 380 sq ft (35 m^{2})
- Cylinders: 4 (Garratt)
- Cylinder size: 16 1/2 in × 22 in (419 mm × 559 mm)
- Valve gear: Walschaerts
- Loco brake: Westinghouse type
- Train brakes: Westinghouse type
Performance figures
- Tractive effort: 42,600 lbf (189.49 kN)
Career
- Operators: Kenya-Uganda Railway (KUR); → East African Railways (EAR)
- Class: KUR: EC2 class; EAR: 52 class
- Number in class: 10
- Numbers: KUR: 67–76; EAR: 5201–5210

The KUR EC2 class, later known as the EAR 52 class, was a class of 1,000 mm (3 ft 3 3/8 in) gauge 4-8-2+2-8-4 Garratt-type articulated steam locomotives operated by the Kenya-Uganda Railway (KUR) and the East African Railways (EAR).

== Production ==
The ten members of the class were ordered by the KUR. Unusually, they were built by North British Locomotive Company in Glasgow, Scotland, instead of Beyer, Peacock & Co., the builder of all the KUR's other Garratt locomotives.

== Service history ==
The whole class entered service in 1931, and its members were later operated by the KUR's successor, the EAR, both in Kenya/Uganda and in Tanzania.

== Class list ==
The numbers, build dates and names of each member of the class were as follows:

Builder's number	KUR number	EAR number	Name	Notes
24070	67	5201	Busoga	
24071	68	5202	Kavirondo	
24072	69	5203	Mubendi	
24073	70	5204	Turkana	
24074	71	5205	Nyeri	
24075	72	5206	Kiambu	
24076	73	5207	Nzoia	
24077	74	5208	Isiolo	
24078	75	5209	Nakuru	
24079	76	5210	Entebbe	

== See also ==
- History of rail transport in Tanzania
- Rail transport in Kenya
- Rail transport in Uganda
