= 4-8-2+2-8-4 =

Garratt locomotive wheel arrangement

4-8-2+2-8-4 (Double Mountain)

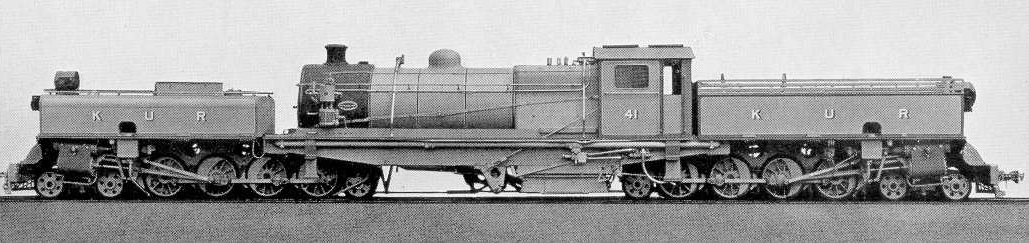
- KUR EC class, the first Double Mountain Garratt, 1926
Equivalent classifications
- UIC class: 2D1+1D2
- French class: 241+142
- Turkish class: 47+47
- Swiss class: 4/7+4/7, 8/14 from the 1920s
- Russian class: 2-4-1+1-4-2
First known tank engine version
- First use: 1926
- Country: Kenya & Uganda
- Locomotive: KUR EC class
- Railway: Kenya-Uganda Railway
- Designer: Beyer, Peacock and Company
- Builder: Beyer, Peacock and Company
First known tender engine version
- First use: 1938
- Country: South Africa
- Locomotive: SAR Class GM
- Railway: South African Railways
- Designer: W.A.J. Day
- Builder: Beyer, Peacock & Company
- Evolved from: 2-8-2+2-8-2

Under the Whyte notation for the classification of steam locomotives by wheel arrangement, a 4-8-2+2-8-4 is a Garratt articulated locomotive consisting of a pair of 4-8-2 engine units back to back, with the boiler and cab suspended between them. The 4-8-2 wheel arrangement has four leading wheels on two axles, usually in a leading bogie, eight powered and coupled driving wheels on four axles and two trailing wheels on one axle, usually in a trailing truck. Since the 4-8-2 type is generally known as a Mountain, the corresponding Garratt type is usually known as a Double Mountain.

== Overview ==
A Garratt locomotive is actually two separate engines combined in a double articulated format, thereby providing multiple powered axles over which the total locomotive weight is spread. This results in a more powerful locomotive since, compared to a tender locomotive of similar total mass with tender included, a much larger percentage of the locomotive's total mass contributes to traction.

The 4-8-2+2-8-4 Double Mountain was probably the optimal Garratt wheel arrangement, with the four-wheeled leading bogies and the two-wheeled trailing trucks on each engine unit ensuring stability at speed and with sixteen coupled wheels for traction. More coupled wheels would inhibit the locomotive on tight curves, while the only advantage of more non-coupled wheels would be to reduce the axle loading.

The largest steam locomotive built in Europe was a 4-8-2+2-8-4 Garratt, built by Beyer, Peacock and Company for the Soviet Railways in 1932. The most numerous Garratt class in the world was also a Double Mountain, the Class GMA and GMAM of the South African Railways, of which 120 were built between 1954 and 1958.

Per definition, most Garratt locomotives are tank engines since they carry all their water and fuel in on-board water tanks and coal bunkers instead of in a separate tender. The three known exceptions were all tank-and-tender engines and were all 4-8-2+2-8-4 Garratts.

4-8-2+2-8-4 Garratt production list – All manufacturers
| Gauge | Railway | Class | Works No. | Units | Year | Builder |
|---|---|---|---|---|---|---|
| 2 ft 6 in | Sierra Leone Government Railway | | 7707-7720 | 14 | 1955-56 | Beyer, Peacock & Company |
| 1,000 mm | CF d'Afrique Occidentale Française | 93 | 2715-2724 | 10 | 1938 | Franco-Belge, France |
| 1,000 mm | CF d'Afrique Occidentale Française | 93 | 2731-2740 | 10 | 1939 | Franco-Belge, France |
| 1,000 mm | CF d'Afrique Occidentale Française | 93 | 2748-2754 | 7 | 1941 | Franco-Belge, France |
| 1,000 mm | Kenya Uganda Railway | EC | 6300-6303 | 4 | 1926 | Beyer, Peacock & Company |
| 1,000 mm | Kenya Uganda Railway | EC1 | 6429-6440 | 12 | 1928 | Beyer, Peacock & Company |
| 1,000 mm | Kenya Uganda Railway | EC1 | 6516-6523 | 8 | 1928 | Beyer, Peacock & Company |
| 1,000 mm | Antofagasta (Chili) & Bolivia Railway | | 6524-6526 | 3 | 1929 | Beyer, Peacock & Company |
| 1,000 mm | Cordoba Central Railway, Argentina | E11 | 6550-6559 | 10 | 1929 | Beyer, Peacock & Company |
| 1,000 mm | Kenya Uganda Railway | EC1 | 6637-6638 | 2 | 1930 | Beyer, Peacock & Company |
| 1,000 mm | Tanganyika Railway | GA | 6718-6720 | 3 | 1931 | Beyer, Peacock & Company |
| 1,000 mm | War Dept., Kenya Uganda Railway | Heavy | 7075-7081 | 7 | 1943 | Beyer, Peacock & Company |
| 1,000 mm | War Dept., Burma | Light | 7140-7159 | 20 | 1945 | Beyer, Peacock & Company |
| 1,000 mm | East African Railways (Note: Originally ordered by Kenya Uganda Railway.) | 56 | 7280-7285 | 6 | 1949 | Beyer, Peacock & Company |
| 1,000 mm | Burma Railways | GE | 7286-7289 | 4 | 1949 | Beyer, Peacock & Company |
| 1,000 mm | Angola: Luanda Railway (CFL) | 500 | 7308-7313 | 6 | 1949 | Beyer, Peacock & Company |
| 1,000 mm | Antofagasta (Chili) & Bolivia Railway | | 7420-7425 | 6 | 1950 | Beyer, Peacock & Company |
| 1,000 mm | East African Railways | 60 | 7577-7580 | 4 | 1954 | Beyer, Peacock & Company |
| 1,000 mm | East African Railways | 59 | 7632-7658 | 27 | 1955 | Beyer, Peacock & Company |
| 1,000 mm | East African Railways | 60 | 7659-7666 | 8 | 1954 | Beyer, Peacock & Company |
| 1,000 mm | East African Railways | 59 | 7700-7706 | 7 | 1955 | Beyer, Peacock & Company |
| 1,000 mm | East African Railways | 60 | 2983-2994 | 12 | 1954 | Franco-Belge, France |
| 1,000 mm | Kenya Uganda Railway | EC2 | 24070-24079 | 10 | 1931 | North British Locomotive Company |
| 1,000 mm | Rede Ferrovaria do Noroeste, Brazil | | 25257-25262 | 6 | 1952 | Henschel & Son |
| 1,050 mm | PLM, Algeria | 241-142.YAT | 2673-2676 | 4 | 1931 | Franco-Belge, France |
| 3 ft 6 in | Queensland Railways | ASG | CLTB 21-25 | 5 | 1944 | Clyde Engineering |
| 3 ft 6 in | Tasmanian Government Railways | ASG | CLTB 37-38 | 2 | 1945 | Clyde Engineering |
| 3 ft 6 in | Queensland Railways | ASG | CLTB 51-53 | 3 | 1944 | Clyde Engineering |
| 3 ft 6 in | Western Australian Government Railways | ASG | CLTB 54-59 | 6 | 1945 | Clyde Engineering |
| 3 ft 6 in | Tasmanian Government Railways | ASG | CLTB 60-62 | 3 | 1945 | Clyde Engineering |
| 3 ft 6 in | Western Australian Government Railways | ASG | CLTB 63-65 | 3 | 1945 | Clyde Engineering |
| 3 ft 6 in | Queensland Railways | ASG | CLTB 11-19 | 9 | 1943-44 | Islington Railway Workshops |
| 3 ft 6 in | Western Australian Government Railways | ASG | CLTB 20 | 1 | 1943-44 | Islington Railway Workshops |
| 3 ft 6 in | Western Australian Government Railways | ASG | CLTB 44-45 | 2 | 1944 ca | Islington Railway Workshops |
| 3 ft 6 in | Western Australian Government Railways | ASG | CLTB 26-30 | 5 | 1943-44 | Midland Railway Workshops |
| 3 ft 6 in | Western Australian Government Railways | ASG | CLTB 46-50 | 5 | 1944 ca | Midland Railway Workshops |
| 3 ft 6 in | Queensland Railways | ASG | CLTB 1-5 | 5 | 1943-44 | Newport Workshops |
| 3 ft 6 in | Western Australian Government Railways | ASG | CLTB 10 | 1 | 1944 | Newport Workshops |
| 3 ft 6 in | Western Australian Government Railways | ASG | CLTB 31-32 | 2 | 1945 | Newport Workshops |
| 3 ft 6 in | Australian Portland Cement | ASG | CLTB 33 | 1 | 1945 | Newport Workshops |
| 3 ft 6 in | Tasmanian Government Railways | ASG | CLTB 6-8 | 3 | 1944 | Newport Workshops |
| 3 ft 6 in | Queensland Railways | ASG | CLTB 9 | 1 | 1944 | Newport Workshops |
| 3 ft 6 in | Benguela Railway (CFB) | 10A | 6333-6338 | 6 | 1927 | Beyer, Peacock & Company |
| 3 ft 6 in | South African Railways | GL | 6530-6531 | 2 | 1930 | Beyer, Peacock & Company |
| 3 ft 6 in | Emu Bay Railway | | 6580-6582 | 3 | 1929 | Beyer, Peacock & Company |
| 3 ft 6 in | Benguela Railway (CFB) | 10B | 6602-6615 | 14 | 1930 | Beyer, Peacock & Company |
| 3 ft 6 in | Nigerian Railways | | 6635-6636 | 2 | 1930 | Beyer, Peacock & Company |
| 3 ft 6 in | South African Railways | GL | 6639-6644 | 6 | 1930 | Beyer, Peacock & Company |
| 3 ft 6 in | South African Railways | GM | 6883-6898 | 16 | 1938 | Beyer, Peacock & Company |
| 3 ft 6 in | South African Railways | GEA | 7168-7217 | 50 | 1945-47 | Beyer, Peacock & Company |
| 3 ft 6 in | Queensland Railways | BG | 7341-7350 | 10 | 1951 | Beyer, Peacock & Company |
| 3 ft 6 in | Benguela Railway (CFB) | 10C | 7366-7375 | 10 | 1951 | Beyer, Peacock & Company |
| 3 ft 6 in | Benguela Railway (CFB) | 10C | 7376-7377 | 2 | 1952 | Beyer, Peacock & Company |
| 3 ft 6 in | South African Railways | GMA | 7550-7552 | 3 | 1956 | Beyer, Peacock & Company |
| 3 ft 6 in | Benguela Railway (CFB) | 10C | 7593-7598 | 6 | 1952 | Beyer, Peacock & Company |
| 3 ft 6 in | Benguela Railway (CFB) | 10D | 7667-7676 | 10 | 1955-56 | Beyer, Peacock & Company |
| 3 ft 6 in | South African Railways | GMA | 7677-7681 | 5 | 1956 | Beyer, Peacock & Company |
| 3 ft 6 in | Rhodesia Railways | 20 | 7685-7699 | 15 | 1954-55 | Beyer, Peacock & Company |
| 3 ft 6 in | South African Railways | GMA | 7750-7764 | 15 | 1956 | Beyer, Peacock & Company |
| 3 ft 6 in | Rhodesia Railways | 20 | 7780-7785 | 6 | 1957 | Beyer, Peacock & Company |
| 3 ft 6 in | Rhodesia Railways | 20A | 7786-7825 | 40 | 1957-58 | Beyer, Peacock & Company |
| 3 ft 6 in | South African Railways | GMA | 7836-7845 | 10 | 1958 | Beyer, Peacock & Company |
| 3 ft 6 in | C.F.Moçambique | 951 | 2059-2070 | 12 | 1952 | Du Haine Saint-Pierre |
| 3 ft 6 in | C.F. du Bas Congo a Katanga | 900 | 2097-2108 | 12 | 1953 | Du Haine Saint-Pierre |
| 3 ft 6 in | Queensland Railways | BG | 2905-2924 | 20 | 1951 | Franco-Belge, France |
| 3 ft 6 in | South Australian Railways | 400 | 2973-2982 | 10 | 1953 | Franco-Belge, France |
| 3 ft 6 in | Moçâmedes Railway (CFM) | 100 | 27000-27005 | 6 | 1953 | Henschel & Son |
| 3 ft 6 in | C.F.Moçambique | 971 | 28642-28646 | 5 | 1956 | Henschel & Son |
| 3 ft 6 in | South African Railways | GMA | 28680-28704 | 25 | 1952 | Henschel & Son |
| 3 ft 6 in | South African Railways | GO | 28705-28729 | 25 | 1954 | Henschel & Son |
| 3 ft 6 in | South African Railways | GMA | 29600-29629 | 30 | 1954 | Henschel & Son |
| 3 ft 6 in | Angola: Luanda Railway (CFL) | 550 | 2493-2498 | 6 | 1954 | Krupp |
| 3 ft 6 in | South African Railways | GMA | 27691-27702 | 12 | 1956 | North British Locomotive Company |
| 3 ft 6 in | South African Railways | GMA | 27769-27778 | 10 | 1958 | North British Locomotive Company |
| 3 ft 6 in | South African Railways | GMA | 27783-27792 | 10 | 1958 | North British Locomotive Company |
| 4 ft 8 1/2 in | Iranian State Railway | 86 | 6787-6790 | 4 | 1936 | Beyer, Peacock & Company |
| 5 ft | Soviet Railways | Я-01 (Note: Also called the SŽD Class Ya.01.) | 6737 | 1 | 1932 | Beyer, Peacock & Company |
| 5 ft 6 in | Buenos Aires & Pacific Railway, Argentina | 951 | 6715 | 1 | 1931 | Beyer, Peacock & Company |
| 5 ft 6 in | Buenos Aires Great Southern, Argentina | 14 | 6417-6428 | 12 | 1928 | Beyer, Peacock & Company |
| 5 ft 6 in | Buenos Aires & Pacific Railway, Argentina | 951 | 6532-6534 | 3 | 1930 | Beyer, Peacock & Company |
| 5 ft 6 in | Bengal Nagpur Railway, India | P | 6931-6934 | 4 | 1939 | Beyer, Peacock & Company |

== Usage ==
=== Angola ===
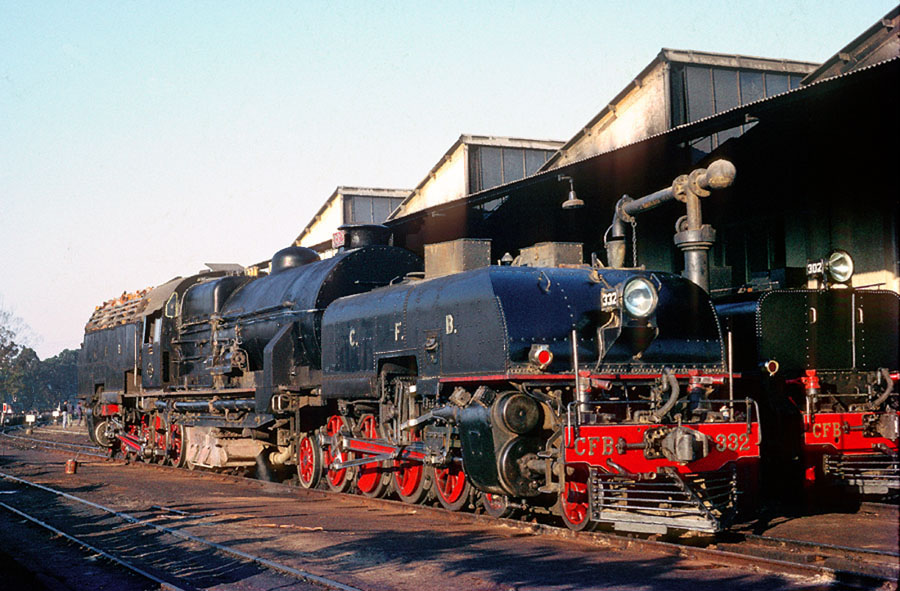
CFB Class 10C at Nova Lisboa

All three main railway systems in Angola used 4-8-2+2-8-4 Garratt locomotives.

The 3 ft 6 in (1,067 mm) Cape gauge Caminho de Ferro de Benguela (CFB) was the largest user, with 48 locomotives built by Beyer, Peacock & Company between 1927 and 1956. Six Class 10A locomotives were delivered in 1927, followed by fourteen Class 10B locomotives in 1930. In 1951 and 1952, eighteen Class 10C locomotives followed, and ten Class 10D locomotives were delivered in 1955 and 1956.

Six 1,000 mm (3 ft 3 3/8 in) metre gauge Class 500 locomotives were built for the Caminhos de Ferro de Luanda (CFL) by Beyer, Peacock & Company in 1949. Six Class 550 locomotives, built for 3 ft 6 in gauge, were delivered to the same system by Friedrich Krupp in 1954.

The third system, the Caminhos de Ferro de Moçâmedes (CFM), bought six Class 100 locomotives from Henschel & Son in 1953.

=== Australia ===
Four classes of 4-8-2+2-8-4 Garratt locomotives entered service in Australia between 1929 and 1953, all on 3 ft 6 in (1,067 mm) gauge.

Beyer, Peacock & Company built three locomotives for the Emu Bay Railway in Tasmania in 1929.

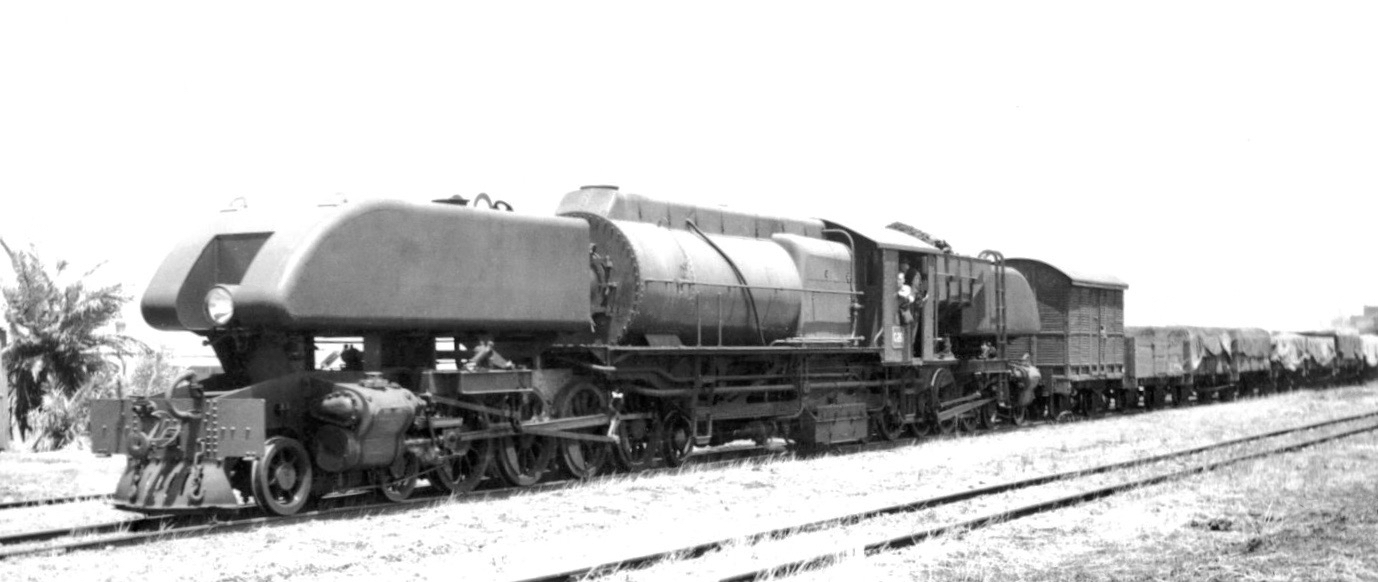
Australian Standard Garratt

The Australian Standard Garratt was developed in Australia during the Second World War, when the Commonwealth Land Transport Board (CLTB) commissioned Chief Mechanical Engineer Frederick Mills of the Western Australian Government Railways (WAGR) to design the locomotive as an emergency measure. Out of an intended 65 locomotives, 57 were built by the Midland Railway Workshops, Newport Workshops, Islington Workshops and Clyde Engineering between 1943 and 1945. The initial allocation was 23 locomotives to the Queensland Railways (QR), eight locomotives to the Tasmanian Government Railways, 25 locomotives to the WAGR and one to the Fyansford Cement Works Railway of Australian Portland Cement. Some of the locomotives later migrated from the QR and WAGR, where they were unpopular with crews, to other systems such as the South Australian Railways and the Emu Bay Railway.

Thirty BG class locomotives were built for the Queensland Railways in 1951, ten by Beyer, Peacock & Company and twenty by Société Franco-Belge.

Franco-Belge also built ten 400 Class locomotives for the South Australian Railways in 1953.

=== India ===
In 1939, the Bengal Nagpur Railway introduced the Class P, weighing in at 230 tons and having a 17-ton axle load. Indian Railways had proposals for a 4-8-2+2-8-4 design known as the Class WHG, which ultimately never came to fruition due to the move towards dieselisation and electrification.

=== Kenya, Tanganyika and Uganda ===
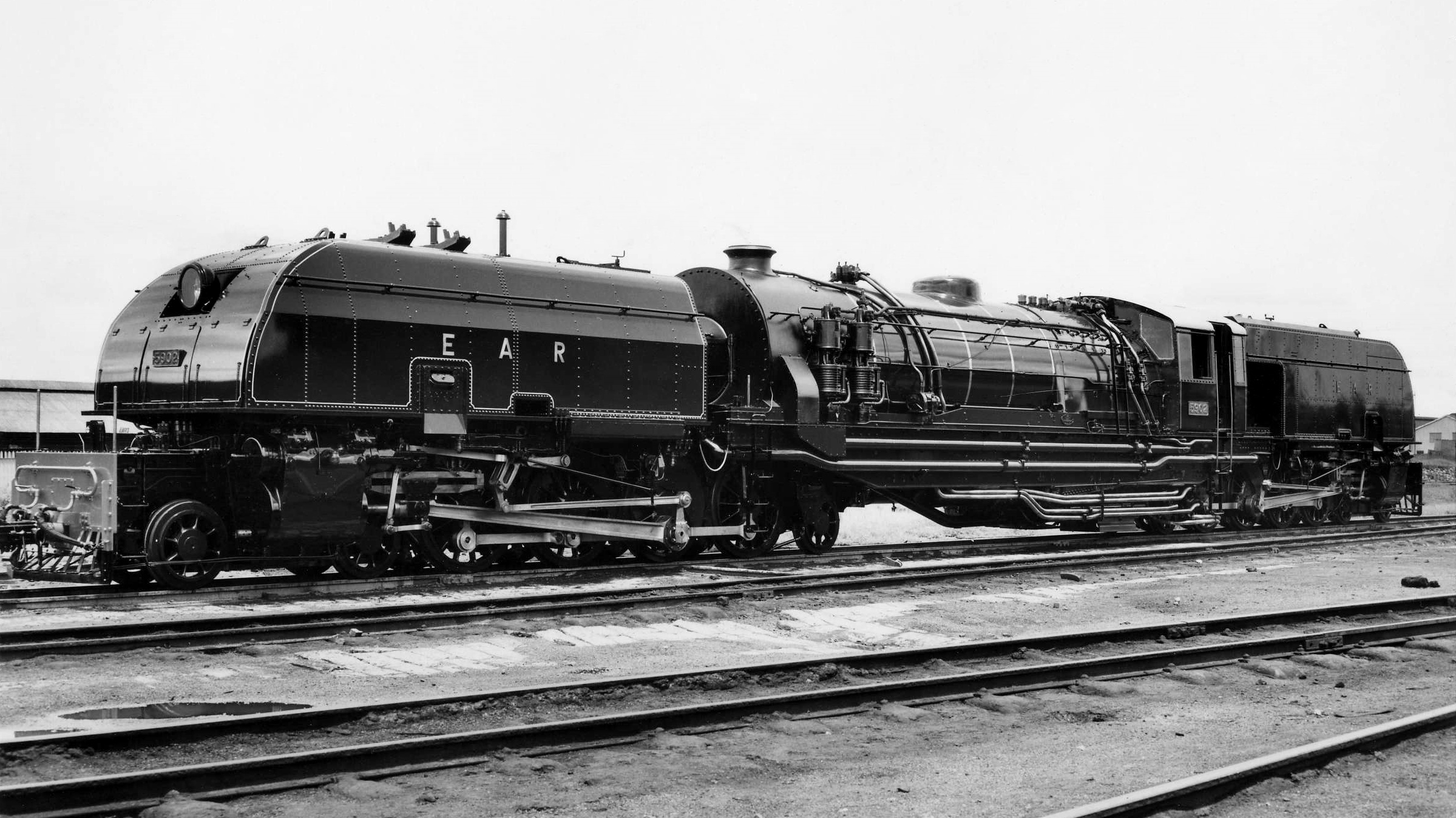
EAR 59 class Garratt

The East African Railways (EAR), formed in 1948 by merging the Kenya and Uganda Railways with the Tanganyika Railways to operate railways in Kenya, Tanganyika and Uganda, operated the largest and most powerful steam locomotive on 1,000 mm (3 ft 3 3/8 in) metre gauge. This was the oil-fired EAR 59 class Garratt, of which 34 were built in two batches by Beyer, Peacock & Company in 1955. The 59 class had the reputation of being amongst the largest and most powerful steam locomotives in the world, with a 7 feet 6 inches (2,286 millimetres) diameter boiler and a tractive effort of 83,350 pounds-force (371 kilonewtons). Although Garratt locomotives operated in all three territories, the 59 Class only worked in Kenya and latterly solely on the line between Nairobi and Mombasa. The last one was withdrawn from regular service in 1980.

=== South Africa ===
Five classes of Double Mountain locomotives, three of which were tank-and-tender Garratts, were acquired by the South African Railways (SAR) between 1929 and 1954.

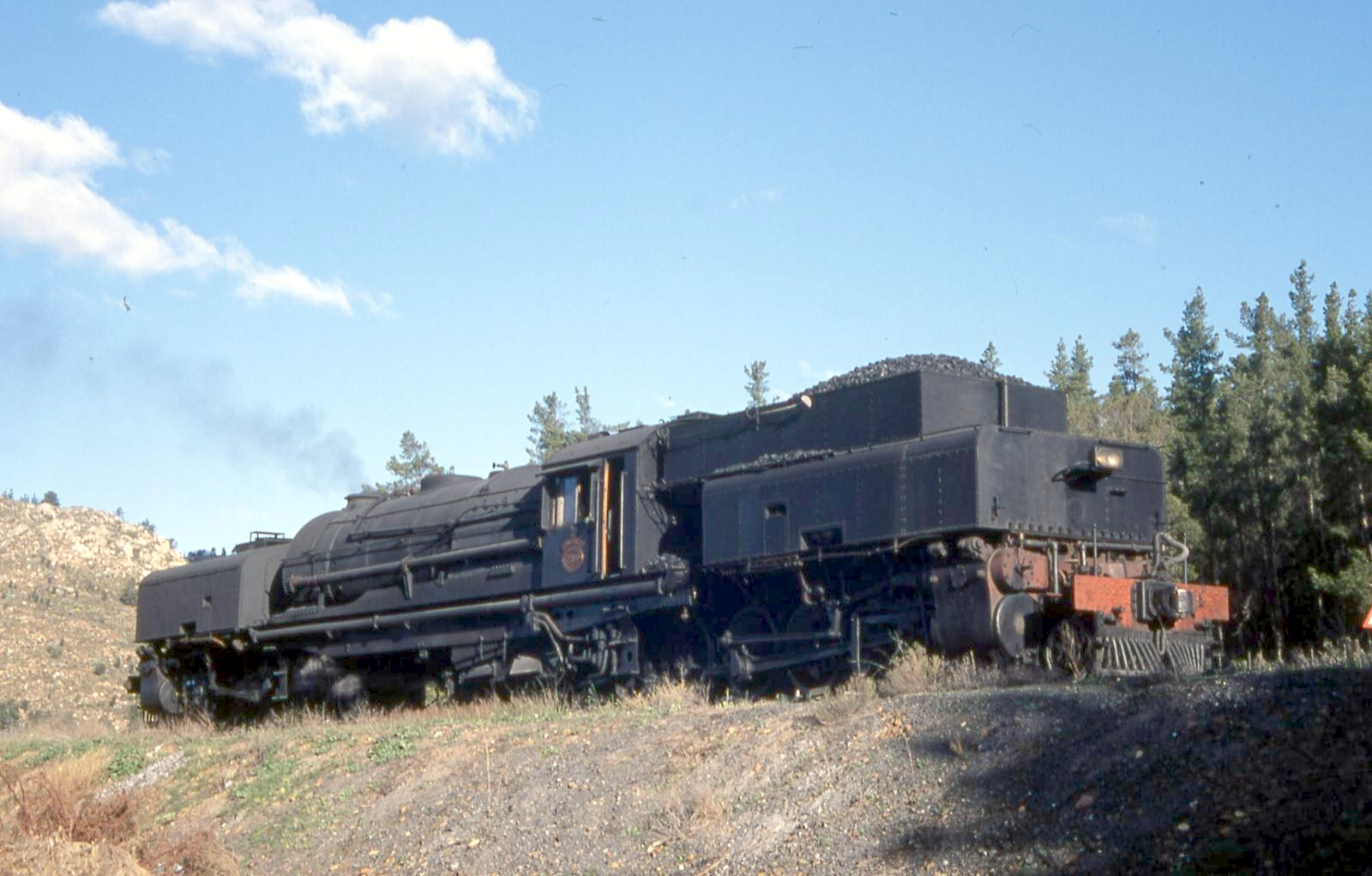
SAR Class GL Garratt

During 1929 and 1930, the SAR placed eight Class GL Garratt locomotives in service, built by Beyer, Peacock & Company to specifications prepared by Chief Mechanical Engineer (CME) Colonel F.R. Collins. Their tractive effort of 78,650 pounds-force (350 kilonewtons) at 75% boiler pressure made them the most powerful steam locomotives in service anywhere in the Southern Hemisphere at the time. They were originally employed on the Durban to Cato Ridge section of the Natal mainline, until electrification between Durban and Pietermaritzburg in 1938 saw them transferred to the gruelling coal train run between Glencoe and Vryheid. This work entailed the regular haulage of 1200 tons up gradients of 1 in 50 (2%), taxing the Class GL even more heavily than the work for which it was designed. Despite this, they maintained an effective service along this line until its electrification in 1968, after which they spent their final working years operating on the line from Stanger to Empangeni.

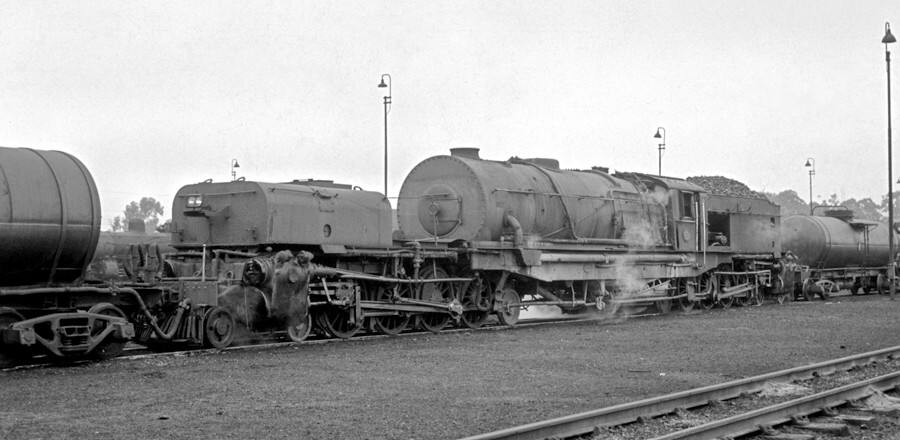
SAR Class GM Garratt

During 1938 and 1939, the SAR placed sixteen Class GM Garratts, built by Beyer, Peacock, in goods train service on the line from Johannesburg via Krugersdorp and Zeerust to Mafeking. After the initial designs by CME W.A.J. Day were rejected by the Chief Civil Engineer because the weight on the leading and trailing bogies exceeded the acceptable limit for 60 pounds per yard (30 kilograms per metre) rail, the water capacity of the front water tank was reduced to 1,600 imperial gallons (7,300 litres) while the rear bunker was redesigned to carry no water and with a coal capacity of 10 tons. The meagre water supply was augmented by semi-permanently coupling a specially built 6,750 imperial gallons (30,700 litres) capacity Type X-17 water tender to the locomotive. In effect, since Garratt locomotives had hitherto been considered as tank engines because they carry all their water and fuel on board, this arrangement introduced the tank-and-tender Garratt. In all other respects, the design followed that of the heavy Class GL Garratt.

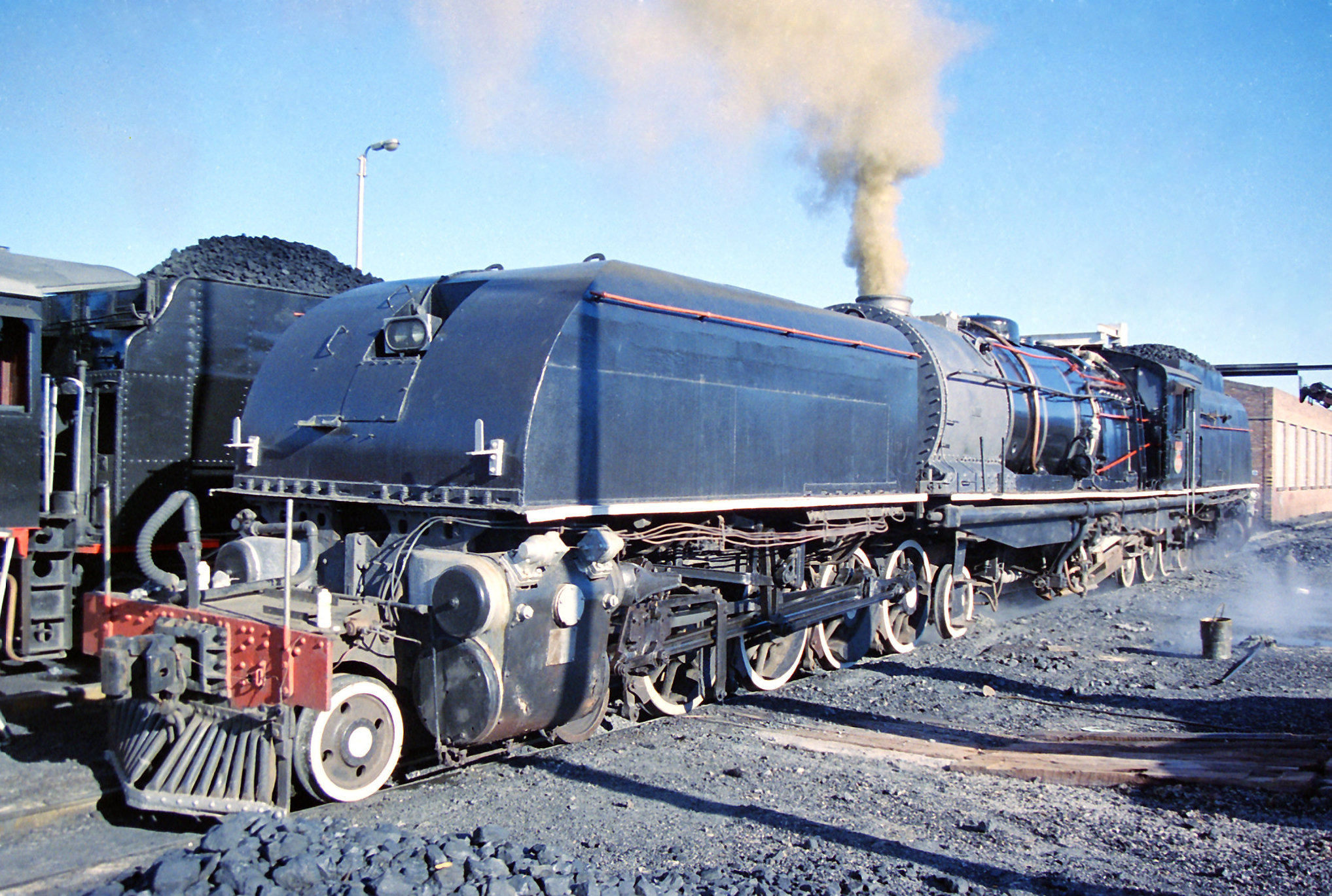
SAR Class GEA Garratt

During 1946 and 1947, the SAR placed fifty Class GEA Garratts in service. The order for fifty locomotives was the largest single Garratt order ever placed with Beyer, Peacock. Designed by CME Dr. M.M. Loubser as a development of the Class GE 2-8-2+2-8-2 locomotive, it was the first SAR Garratt to have streamlined water tanks and coal bunkers. Meant for goods traffic on light 60 pounds per yard (30 kilograms per metre) rail on branch lines, the GEA was superheated and had Walschaerts valve gear. It was the only post-war SAR Garratt to be without a mechanical stoker and also one of the largest designs of Garratt to be hand-fired.

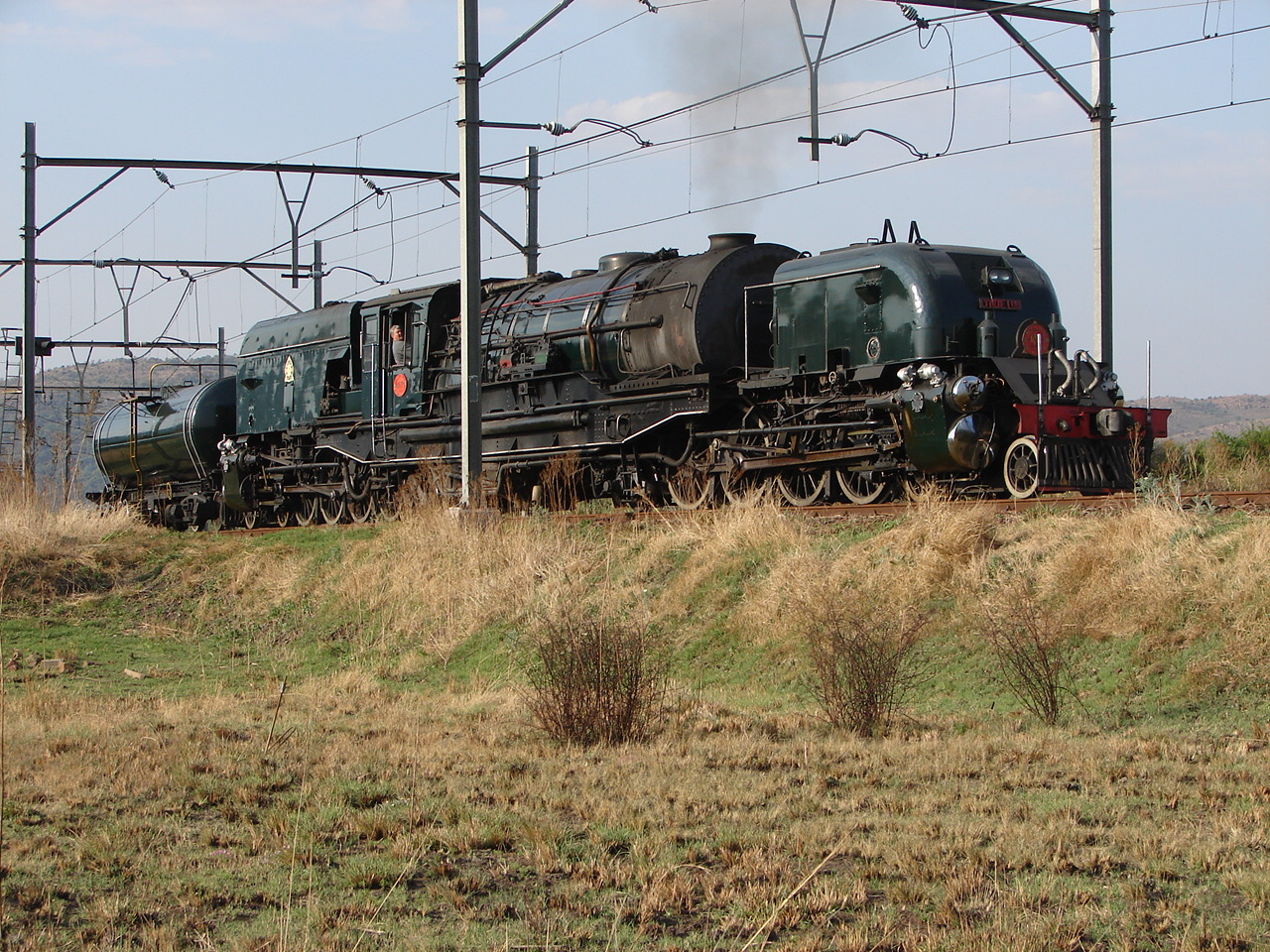
SAR Class GMAM Garratt

Between 1954 and 1958, 120 Class GMA branch line and Class GMAM mainline Garratts entered service. This was the most numerous Garratt class in the world. A development of the Class GM, the Classes GMA and GMAM were identical and their water and coal capacities could be adjusted to suit by installing or removing plates in the coal and water spaces. They could easily be converted back and forth between the two versions, and often were. Like the Class GM, it was a tank-and-tender Garratt and the water supply was augmented by semi-permanently coupling a 6,815 imperial gallons (30,980 litres) capacity Type X-17 or 6,790 imperial gallons (30,900 litres) capacity Type X-20 water tender to the locomotive. Designed under the supervision of CME L.C. Grubb, they were built by three manufacturers, 55 by Henschel & Son, 33 by Beyer, Peacock and 32 by North British Locomotive Company, subcontracted by Beyer, Peacock.

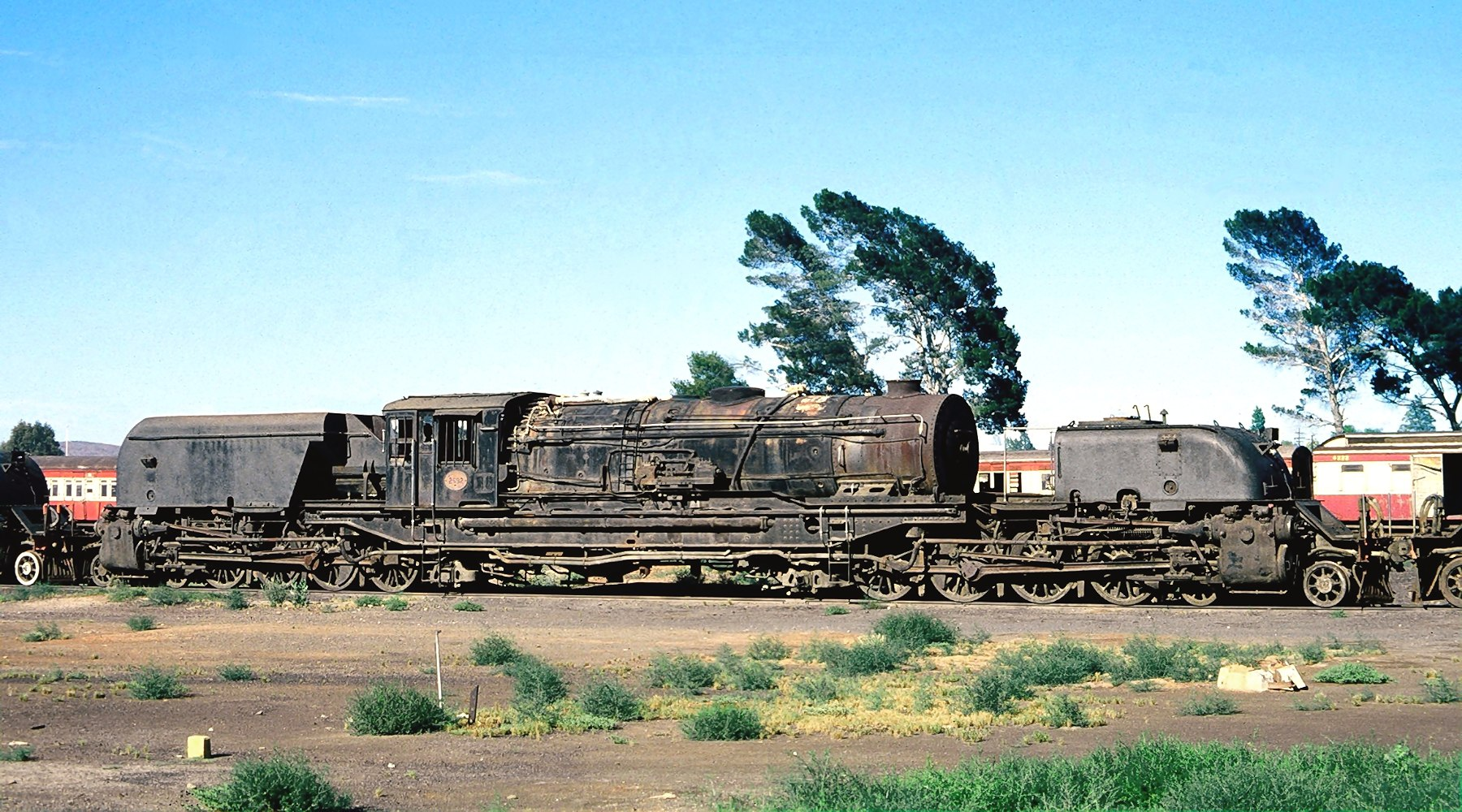
SAR Class GO Garratt

Also in 1954, 25 Class GO light branch line Garratts entered service. Designed under Grubb's supervision to operate on lighter rails, they were built by Henschel. In design and general appearance, the Class GO was very similar to the Class GMA, with the chief differences aimed at reducing weight, such as a smaller boiler with a reduced diameter, a smaller firebox and grate area and a half ton smaller capacity coal bunker. The one-piece cast steel frame and engine units were identical to that of the Class GMA, except that the cylinders had been lined and sleeved to reduce the bore from 20 1/2 to 18 1/2 inches (521 to 470 millimetres) to suit the smaller boiler. The Class GO was also a tank-and-tender Garratt and carried water only in its front tank while the rear bunker carried only coal, and it also ran with a semi-permanently coupled 6,815 imperial gallons (30,980 litres) capacity Type X-17 water tender.

=== Soviet Union ===
A 4-8-2+2-8-4 Garratt was built for the 5 ft (1,524 mm) gauge Soviet Railways by Beyer, Peacock and Company in 1932. This was the largest steam locomotive in Europe and the largest Garratt in the world. It weighed 262.5 tons in working order and produced 90,000 pounds-force (400 kilonewtons) of tractive effort at 95% boiler pressure. It was built with 5 inches (127 millimetres) thick bar frames, was 17 feet 2 inches (5.232 metres) high, and was tested in temperatures as low as −41 °C (−42 °F).
