= TR NZ class =

Class of locomotives

Tanganyika Railway NZ class; East African Railways 22 class
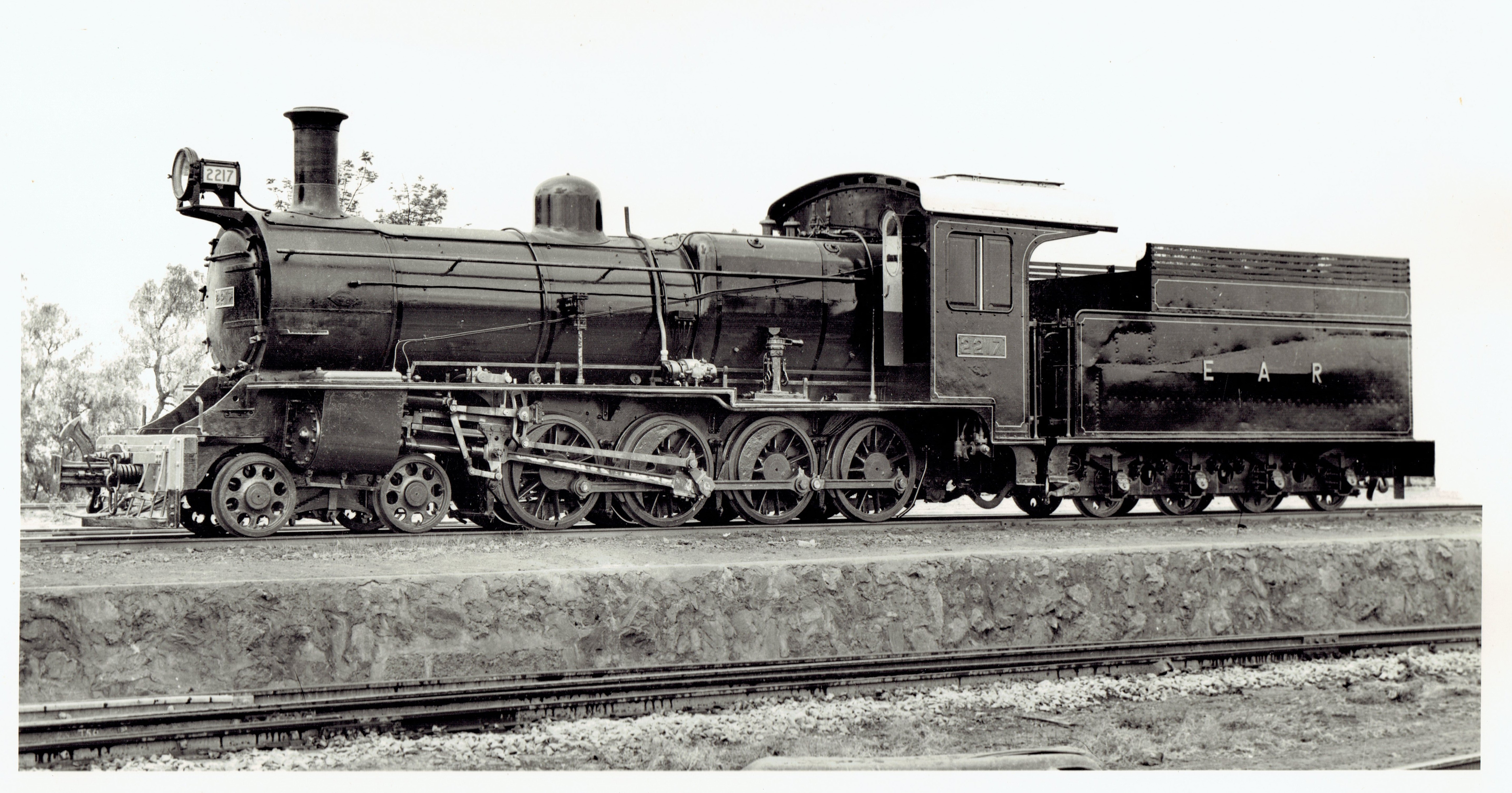
- East African Railways publicity photograph of no. 2217, c. 1953
Type and origin
- Power type: Steam
- Builder: Nasmyth, Wilson and Company
- Serial number: 1050–1053
- Build date: 1915
- Total produced: 4
Specifications
- Configuration
  - Whyte: 4-8-0
- Gauge: 1,000 mm (3 ft 3 3/8 in)
Career
- Operators: Tanganyika Railway (TR); → East African Railways (EAR)
- Class: TR: NZ class; EAR: 22 class
- Numbers: TR: 1095–1098 / 200–203; EAR: 2201–2504
- Disposition: All scrapped

The TR NZ class, later known as the EAR 22 class, was a class of 1,000 mm (3 ft 3 3/8 in) gauge 4-8-0 steam locomotives built in 1915 by Nasmyth, Wilson and Company in Patricroft, Salford, England. The class had been ordered by the Nizam's Guaranteed State Railway (NGSR) for operation on its network in the Dominion of Nizam, better known as the Hyderabad State, in India. However, the locomotives in the class were never delivered to the NGSR, and, in the end, served their entire working lives in Tanganyika, East Africa.

== Service history ==
In March 1916, while the four members of the class were on their way to India, they were commandeered to assist in the British invasion of German East Africa, where they entered service with the Tanganyika Railway (TR), still carrying their NGSR lettering and numbers 1095–1098. In the early 1930s, they were officially classified as the TR's NZ class (the NZ being a reference to "Nizam"), and renumbered as 200–203.

The class was later operated by the TR's successor, the East African Railways (EAR), as its 22 class, numbers 2201–2204. In the late 1940s, two of them were transferred to the Southern Province Railway, an isolated network developed to support the ultimately unsuccessful Tanganyika Groundnut Scheme. Nos 2202 and 2204 were scrapped in 1952, and 2201 and 2203 in 1956.

== See also ==
- NZ TR class
- History of rail transport in Tanzania
