= List of cities in Tanzania =

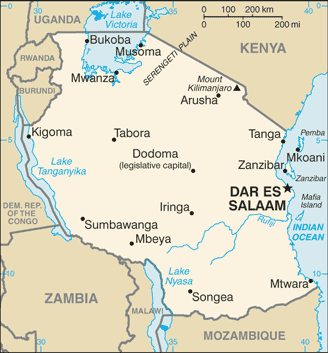
Map of Tanzania.

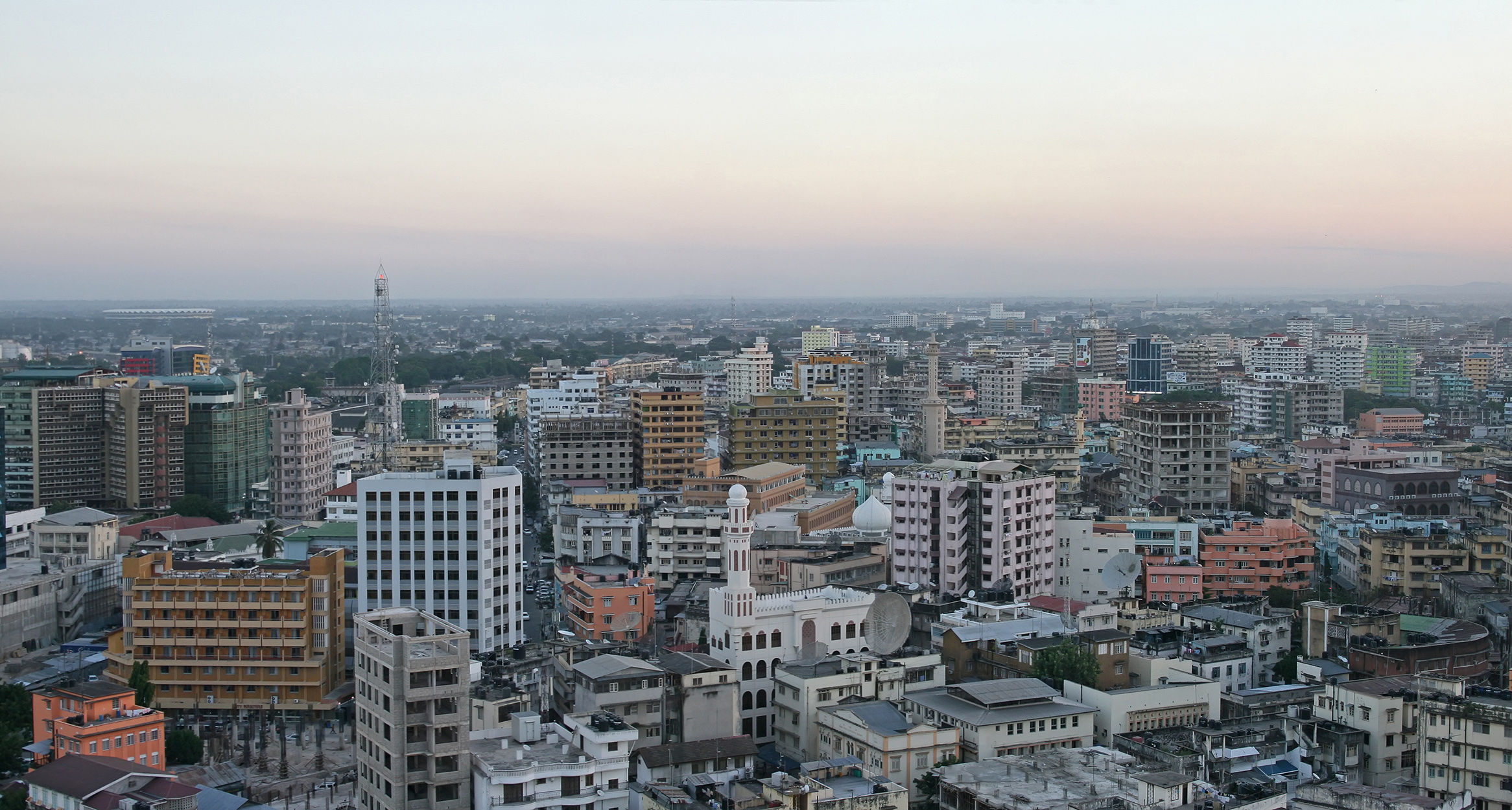
Dar es Salaam, largest city in Tanzania.

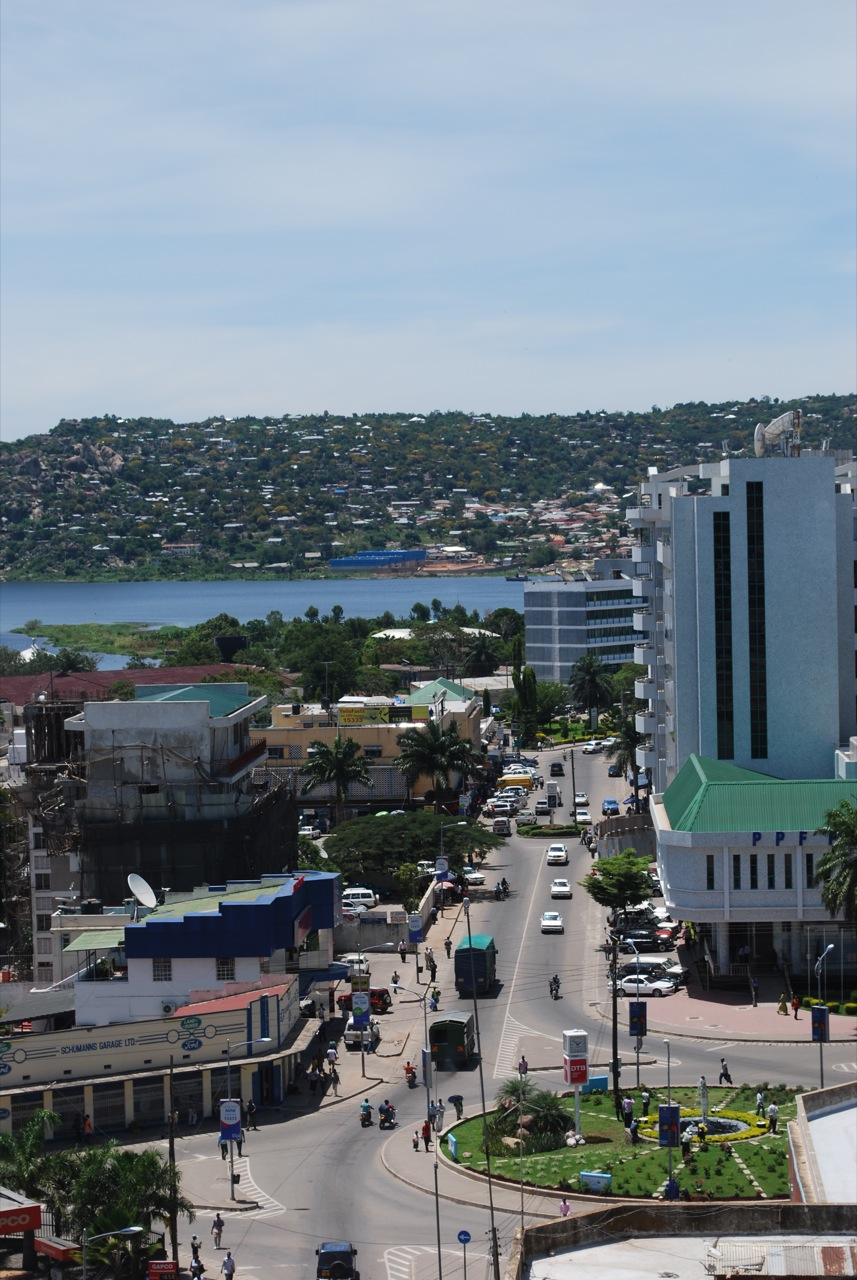
Mwanza, Tanzania's second largest city.

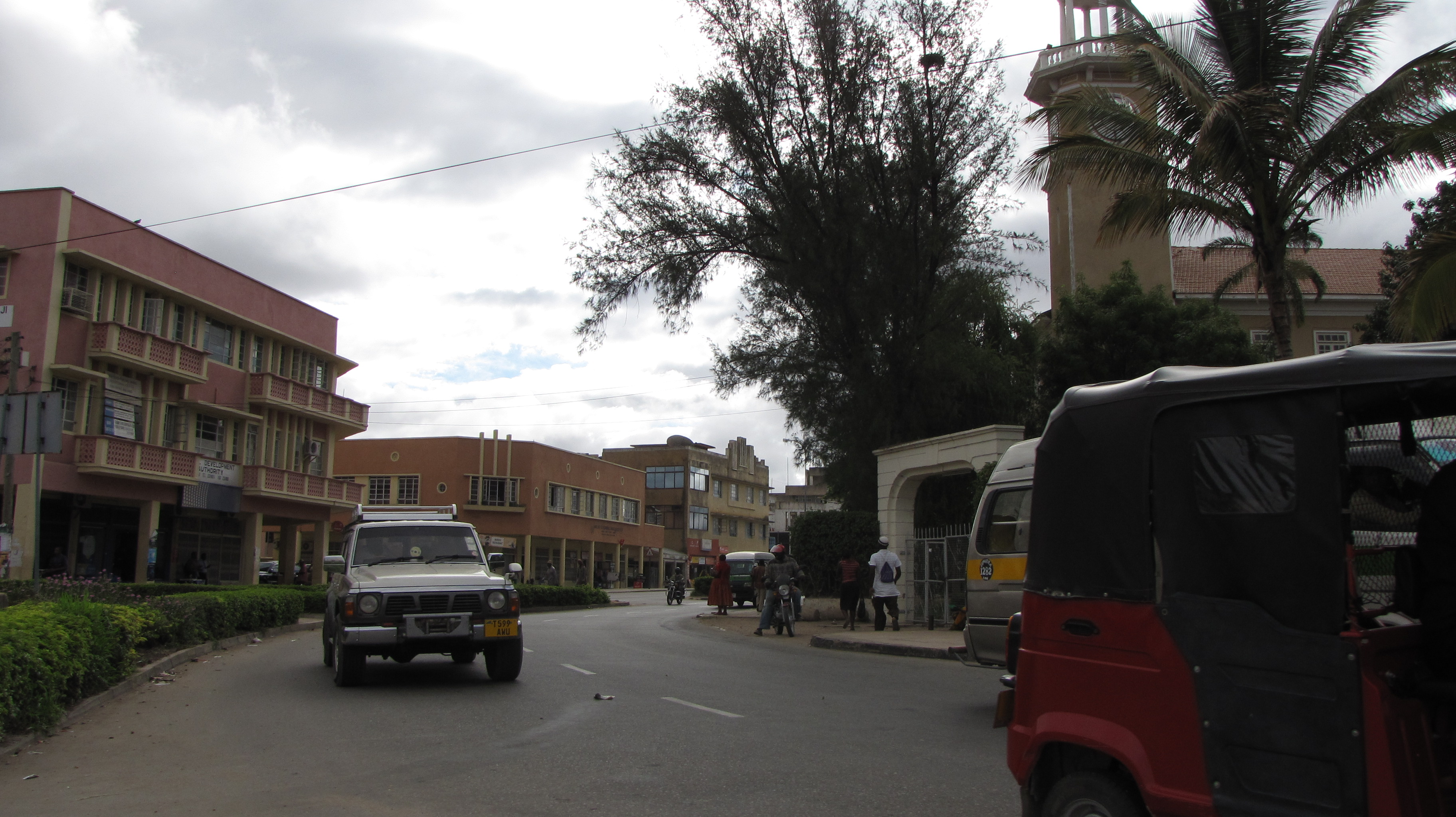
Dodoma, capital city of Tanzania.

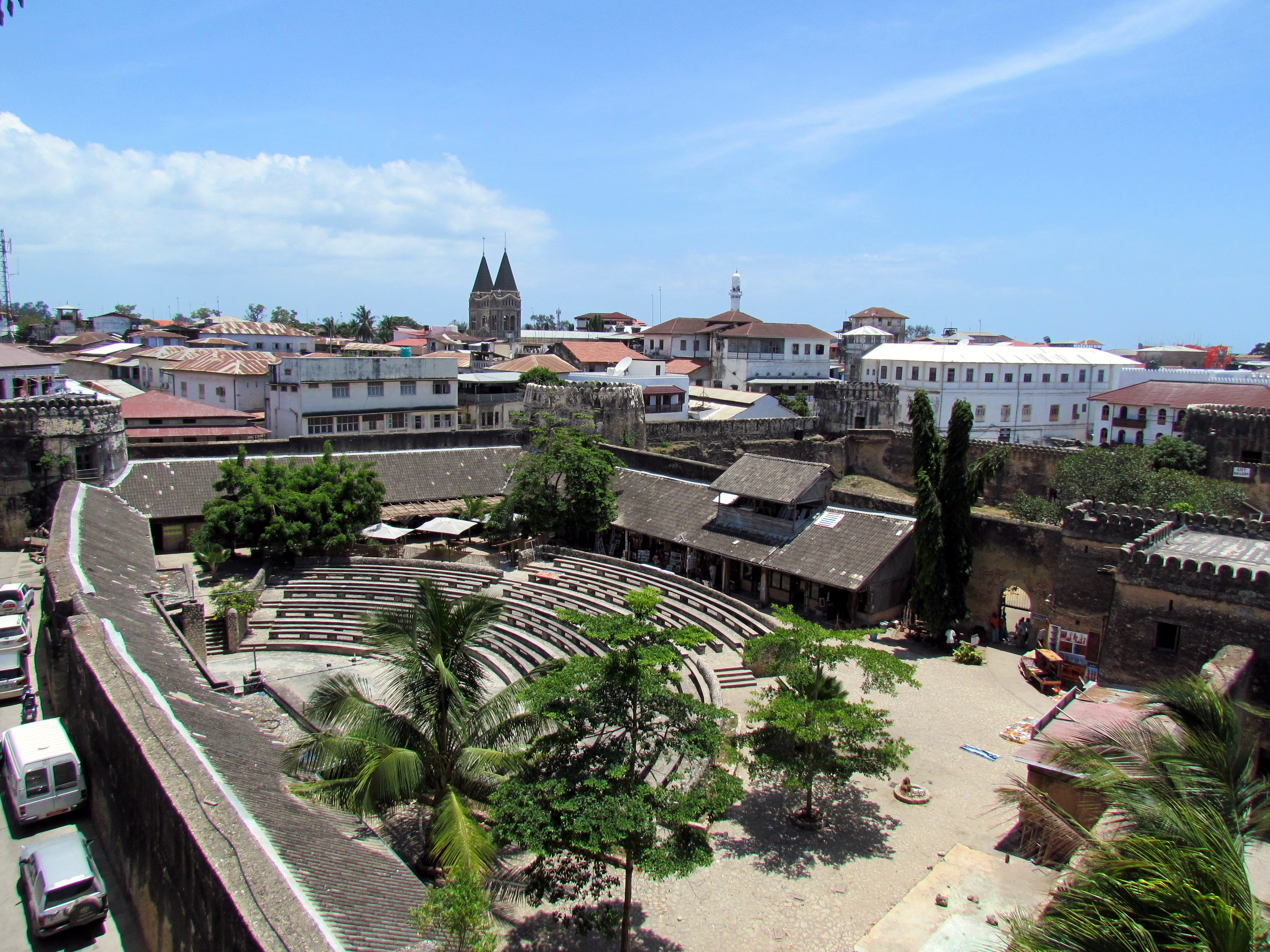
Zanzibar City

This is a list of cities, municipalities, and towns in Tanzania.

== List ==
Rank	City	1978	1999	2002	2012	Region
1.	Dar es Salaam	-	1,205,443	2,339,910	4,364,541 (Note: For purposes of this table, the city of Dar es Salaam is coextensive with the Dar es Salaam region.)	Dar es Salaam
2.	Mwanza	110,553	172,287	385,810	706,543 (Note: For purposes of this table, Mwanza is composed of the Nyamagana and Ilemela municipal councils.)	Mwanza
3.	Arusha	55,223	102,544	333,791	416,442 (Note: Based on the population of the Arusha City Council.)	Arusha
4.	Mbeya	76,601	130,798	266,422	385,279 (Note: Based on the population of the Mbeya City Council.)	Mbeya
5.	Morogoro	60,782	117,760	228,863	315,866 (Note: Based on the population of the Morogoro Municipal Council.)	Morogoro
6.	Tanga	103,399	137,364	243,580	273,332 (Note: Based on the population of the Tanga City Council.)	Tanga
7.	Kahama	–	–	–	242,208 (Note: Based on the population of the Kahama Town Council.)	Shinyanga
8.	Tabora	67,388	92,779	135,243	226,999 (Note: Based on the population of the Taboura Municipal Council.)	Tabora
9.	Zanzibar City	110,531	157,634	206,292	223,033 (Note: For purposes of this table, Zanzibare City is coextensive with the Zanzibar Urban District (Mjini District).)	Zanzibar West
10.	Kigoma	50,075	74,224	144,852	215,458 (Note: Based on the population of the Kigoma-Ujiji Municipal Council.)	Kigoma
11.	Dodoma	45,807	83,205	150,604	213,636 (Note: Based on the population of the Dodoma Municipal Council.)	Dodoma
12.	Sumbawanga	28,586	47,878	80,284	209,793 (Note: Based on the population of the Sumbawanga Municipal Council.)	Rukwa
13.	Kasulu	–	–	–	208,244 (Note: Based on the population of the Kasulu Town Council.)	Kigoma
14.	Songea	17,955	52,985	108,771	203,309 (Note: Based on the population of the Songea Municipal Council.)	Ruvuma
15.	Moshi	52,046	96,838	144,336	184,292 (Note: Based on the population of the Moshi Municipal Council.)	Kilimanjaro
16.	Musoma	31,051	63,652	108,242	178,356 (Note: Based on the population of the Musoma Municipal Council.)	Mara
17.	Shinyanga	20,439	46,802	135,166	161,391 (Note: Based on the population of the Shinyanga Municipal Council.)	Shinyanga
18.	Iringa	57,164	84,860	106,668	151,345 (Note: Based on the population of the Iringa Municipal Council.)	Iringa
19.	Singida	29,258	39,598	115,354	150,379 (Note: Based on the population of the Singida Municipal Council.)	Singida
20.	Njombe	–	25,213	42,332	130,223 (Note: Based on the population of the Njombe Town Council.)	Njombe
21.	Bukoba	21,547	28,702	61,652	128,796 (Note: Based on the population of the Bukoba Municipal Council.)	Kagera
22.	Kibaha	–	–	–	128,488 (Note: Based on the population of the Kibaha Town Council.)	Pwani
23.	Mtwara	48,491	66,452	92,602	108,299 (Note: Based on the population of the Mtwara Municipal Council.)	Mtwara
24.	Mpanda	13,450	41,014	45,977	102,900 (Note: Based on the population of the Mpanda Town Council.)	Katavi
25.	Tunduma	–	–	34,461	97,562 (Note: Based on the population of the Tunduma Town Council.)	Mbeya
26.	Makambako	–	–	51,049	93,827 (Note: Based on the population of the Makambako Town Council.)	Njombe
27.	Babati	–	–	–	93,108 (Note: Based on the population of the Babati Town Council.)	Manyara
28.	Handeni	–	–	–	79,056 (Note: Based on the population of the Handeni Town Council.)	Tanga
29.	Lindi	27,312	41,587	41,549	78,841 (Note: Based on the population of the Lindi Municipal Council.)	Lindi
30.	Korogwe	–	–	–	68,308 (Note: Based on the population of the Korogwe Town Council.)	Tanga
31.	Mafinga	–	–	–	51,902 (Note: Based on the population of the Mafinga Town Council.)	Iringa
32.	Nansio	–	–	–	50,500 (Note: Based on the population of the Nansio Town Council.)	Mwanza

== See also ==
- Urban planning in Africa: Tanzania
- List of cities in East Africa
