= Brazzaville Conference =

1944 Free France meeting in French Equatorial Africa

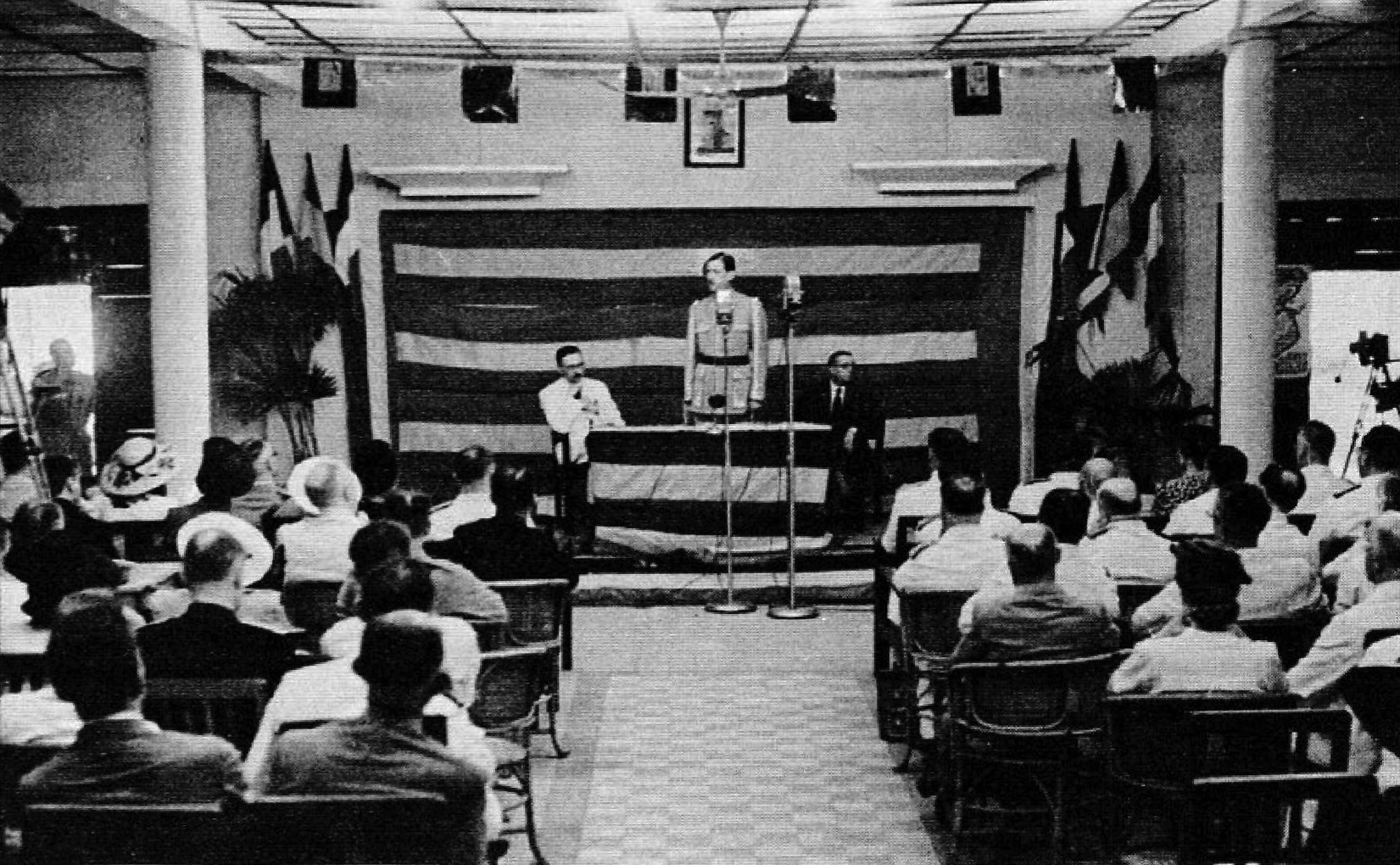
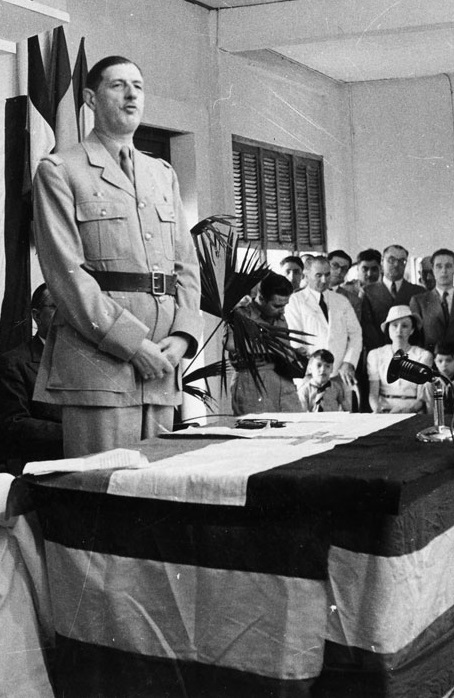
Charles de Gaulle speaking at the opening of the Brazzaville Conference on 30 January 1944

The Brazzaville Conference (French: Conférence de Brazzaville) was a meeting of prominent Free French leaders held from 30 January to 8 February 1944 in Brazzaville, the capital of French Equatorial Africa, during World War II.

After the Fall of France to Nazi Germany, the collaborationist Vichy France regime controlled the colonies. One by one, however, they peeled off and switched their allegiance to the exiled Free France government led by Charles de Gaulle. In January 1944, Free French politicians and high-ranking colonial officials from the French African colonies met in Brazzaville, now in the Republic of the Congo. The conference recommended political, social and economic reforms and led to an agreement called the Brazzaville Declaration.

De Gaulle believed that the survival of France depended on support from the colonies, and he made numerous concessions. They included the end of forced labour, the end of special legal restrictions that applied to indigenous peoples but not to whites, the establishment of elected territorial assemblies, representation in Paris in a new "French Federation" and the eventual entry of black Africans in the French National Assembly. However, independence and even limited "self-government" were explicitly rejected as a future possibility, and the model of assimilation was reinforced.

== Context ==
During World War II, the French colonial empire played an essential role in the Liberation of France by gradually aligning with Free France. After the end of the Tunisia campaign, the entire colonial empire reunited toward the Allies with the exception of French Indochina, which remained loyal to the Vichy government.

That made the French Committee of National Liberation begin questioning the future of the colonies. The war created many difficulties for local people and saw the growth of nationalist aspirations and tensions between communities in French North Africa, particularly in Algeria and Tunisia. In addition, the French were being aided by the United States which opposed colonialism. In Madagascar, the month of occupation by the United Kingdom after the invasion of the island had weakened French authority.

René Pleven, Commissioner for the Colonies in the French Committee of National Liberation, wanted to avoid international arbitration of the future of the French Empire and in that regard organized the Brazzaville Conference in French Equatorial Africa.

== Conference ==
The Brazzaville Conference was held in early February 1944 in Brazzaville, the capital of French Equatorial Africa, during World War II.

Initially, the French Committee of National Liberation wanted to include all the governors from all free territories, but difficulties from the war made the Committee include administrative représentants from French territories in Africa, which had already joined de Gaulle and René Pleven. Invitations were sent to 21 governors; nine members of the Provisional Consultative Assembly and six observers from Algeria, Tunisia and Morocco.

De Gaulle opened the Conference by saying that he wanted to build new foundations for France after years under the domination of Philippe Pétain's authoritarian Vichy France regime. There was also a seemingly more open tone towards the French colonies. De Gaulle wanted to renew the relationship between France and French Africa.

The administrator Félix Éboué prominently figured in the conference. Éboué brought in the local Cercle des Évolués of Brazzaville to write essays presented as "African Opinions". However, this group largely consisted of "elite Congolese men" and its written contributions "advocated for a very narrow type of citizenship that was dependent upon assimilation".

== Conclusions ==
The Brazzaville Declaration included the following points:

1. The French Empire would remain united.
2. Semi-autonomous assemblies would be established in each colony.
3. Citizens of France's colonies would share equal rights with French citizens.
4. Citizens of French colonies would have the right to vote for the French National Assembly.
5. The native population would be employed in public service positions within the colonies.
6. Economic reforms would be made to diminish the exploitative nature of the relationship between France and its colonies.

The possibility of complete independence was soundly rejected, as was the idea of more limited "self-government" along British lines for the colonies. De Gaulle stated:

The aims of France's civilizing mission preclude any thought of autonomy or any possibility of development outside the French empire. Self-government must be rejected - even in the more distant future.

Likewise, the preamble of the draft document of the Conference states:

The ends of the civilizing work accomplished by France in the colonies excludes any idea of autonomy, all possibility of evolution outside the French bloc of the Empire; the eventual Constitution, even in the future of self-government in the colonies is denied.

The Conference also recommended ending forced labour.

== Impact and analysis ==
The Brazzaville Conference is still regarded as a turning point for France and its colonial empire. Many historians view it as the first step towards decolonization, albeit a precarious one.

Others have challenged this view. According to historian Xavier Yacono, the Brazzaville Conference considered decolonization "unthinkable" (as it explicitly rejected even the long-term prospect of autonomy for the colonies). Other analysts have stated that the conference's aim was exactly to render the French colonial enterprise more durable through a modernized approach to governance. An internal governmental note which circulated after the Brazzaville Conference pointed out that citizenship in the colonies was to be "reserved for local elites favorable to the continuation of privileged ties to France", and that the assimilation of these local elites "corrected [the colonies'] natural tendency towards independence".

Martin Shipway has argued that the Brazzaville Conference "was staged in large part as a propaganda event" to convince both the colonial subjects and the Western rivals of France that its colonial empire was characterized by "generosity and efficiency". Rather than trying and failing to make substantial steps towards decolonization, according to Shipway, the conference "succeeded in passing the recommendations with which the colonial service as a whole no doubt felt most comfortable."

== See also ==
- Decolonisation of Africa § French colonial empire
- Second colonial occupation
- Fonds d'Investissements pour le Developpement Economique et Social (FIDES), established 1946
- Declaration of Philadelphia (10 May 1944)
