= TR ML class =

Tanganyika Railway ML class; East African Railways 26 class
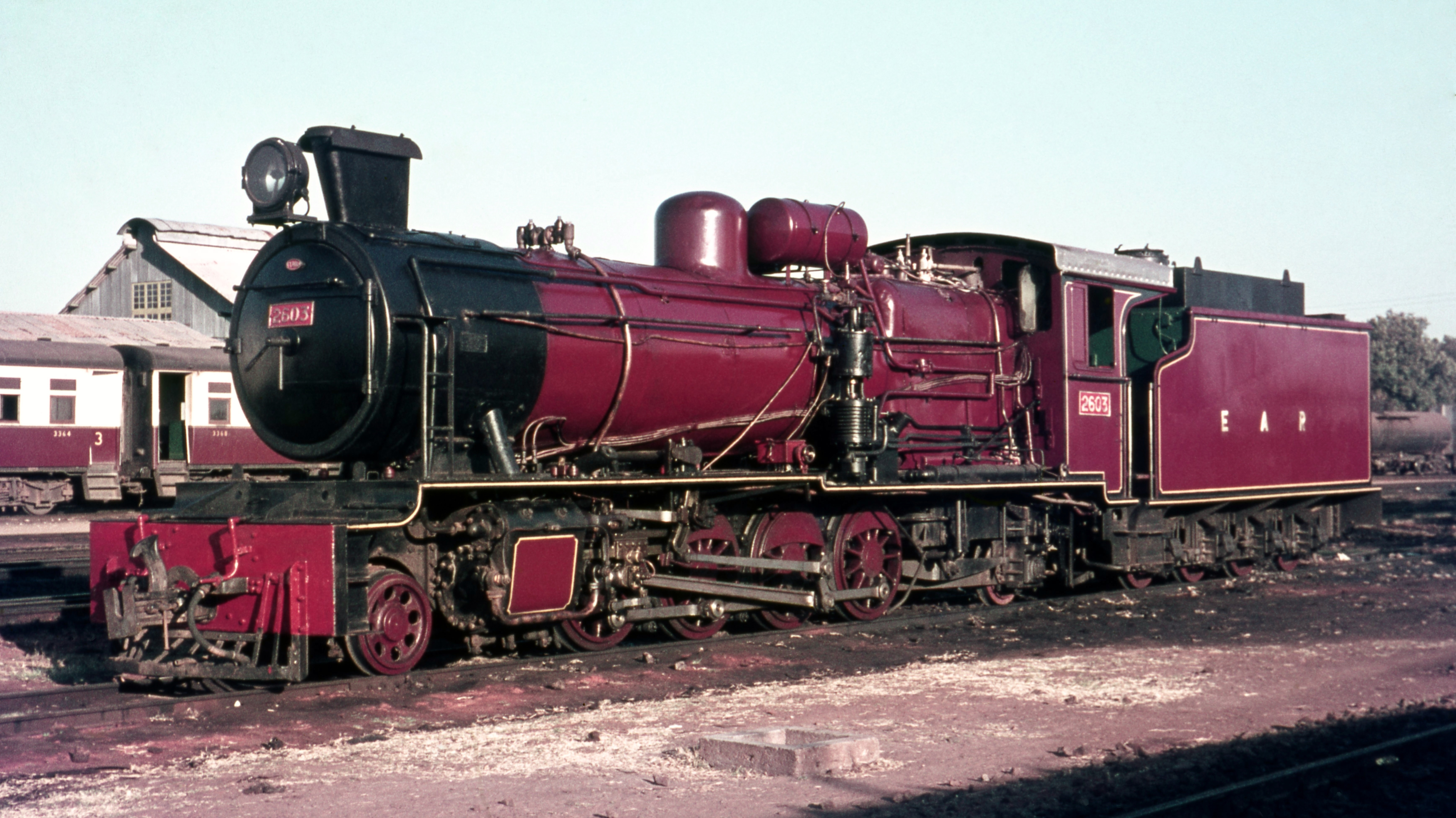
- No. 2603 at Tabora depot, Tanzania, in 1968
Type and origin
- Power type: Steam
- Builder: W. G. Bagnall; Vulcan Foundry; Robert Stephenson and Hawthorns
- Serial number: WGB: 2832–2837 (1947); VF: 6182–6187 (1952); RSH: 7444–7449 (1952)
- Build date: 1947, 1952
- Total produced: 12
Specifications
- Configuration
  - Whyte: 2-8-2
  - UIC: 1′D1' h2
- Gauge: 1,000 mm (3 ft 3 3/8 in)
- Driver dia.: 43 in (1,092 mm)
- Adhesive weight: 39.0 long tons (39.6 t)
- Loco weight: 51.8 long tons (52.6 t)
- Fuel type: Oil
- Fuel capacity: 1,300 imp gal (5,900 L; 1,600 US gal)
- Water cap.: 4,200 imp gal (19,000 L; 5,000 US gal)
- Firebox
  - Grate area: 27 sq ft (2.51 m^{2})
- Boiler pressure: 180 psi (1.24 MPa)
- Heating surface
  - Firebox: 139 sq ft (12.9 m^{2})
  - Tubes: 1,272 sq ft (118.2 m^{2})
  - Total surface: 1,731 sq ft (160.8 m^{2})
- Superheater
  - Heating area: 321 sq ft (29.8 m^{2})
- Cylinders: 2
- Cylinder size: 17 1/2 in × 23 in (444 mm × 584 mm)
Performance figures
- Tractive effort: 25,050 lbf (111.43 kN)
Career
- Operators: Tanganyika Railway (TR); → East African Railways (EAR)
- Class: TR: ML class; EAR: 26 class
- Number in class: 12
- Numbers: TR: 700–705/600–605; EAR: 2601–2612
- Delivered: 1947, 1952

The TR ML class, later known and expanded as the EAR 26 class, was a class of 1,000 mm (3 ft 3 3/8 in) gauge 2-8-2 steam locomotives designed for and ordered by the Tanganyika Railway (TR), as a development of the TR MK class.

The six members of the ML class were built in 1947 by W. G. Bagnall, in Stafford, England, and delivered to the TR. They were later operated by the TR's successor, the East African Railways (EAR), as its 26 class. In 1952, six further members of the 26 class were delivered to the EAR. They had been built by Vulcan Foundry, of Newton-le-Willows, Lancashire (now part of Merseyside), England, and Robert Stephenson and Hawthorns of North East England.

== Class list ==
The builders number, build year and fleet numbers of each member of the class were as follows:

Builders number	Built	1st TR number	2nd TR number	EAR number	Notes
2832	1947	700	600	2601	
2833	1947	701	601	2602	
2834	1947	702	602	2603	
2835	1947	703	603	2604	
2836	1947	704	604	2605	
2837	1947	705	605	2606	
6182/7444	1952	–	–	2607	
6183/7445	1952	–	–	2608	
6184/7446	1952	–	–	2609	
6185/7447	1952	–	–	2610	
6186/7448	1952	–	–	2611	
6187/7449	1952	–	–	2612	

== See also ==
- History of rail transport in Tanzania
- Rail transport in Kenya
- Rail transport in Uganda
