= TR RV class =

Class of locomotives

Tanganyika Railway RV class; East African Railways 21 class
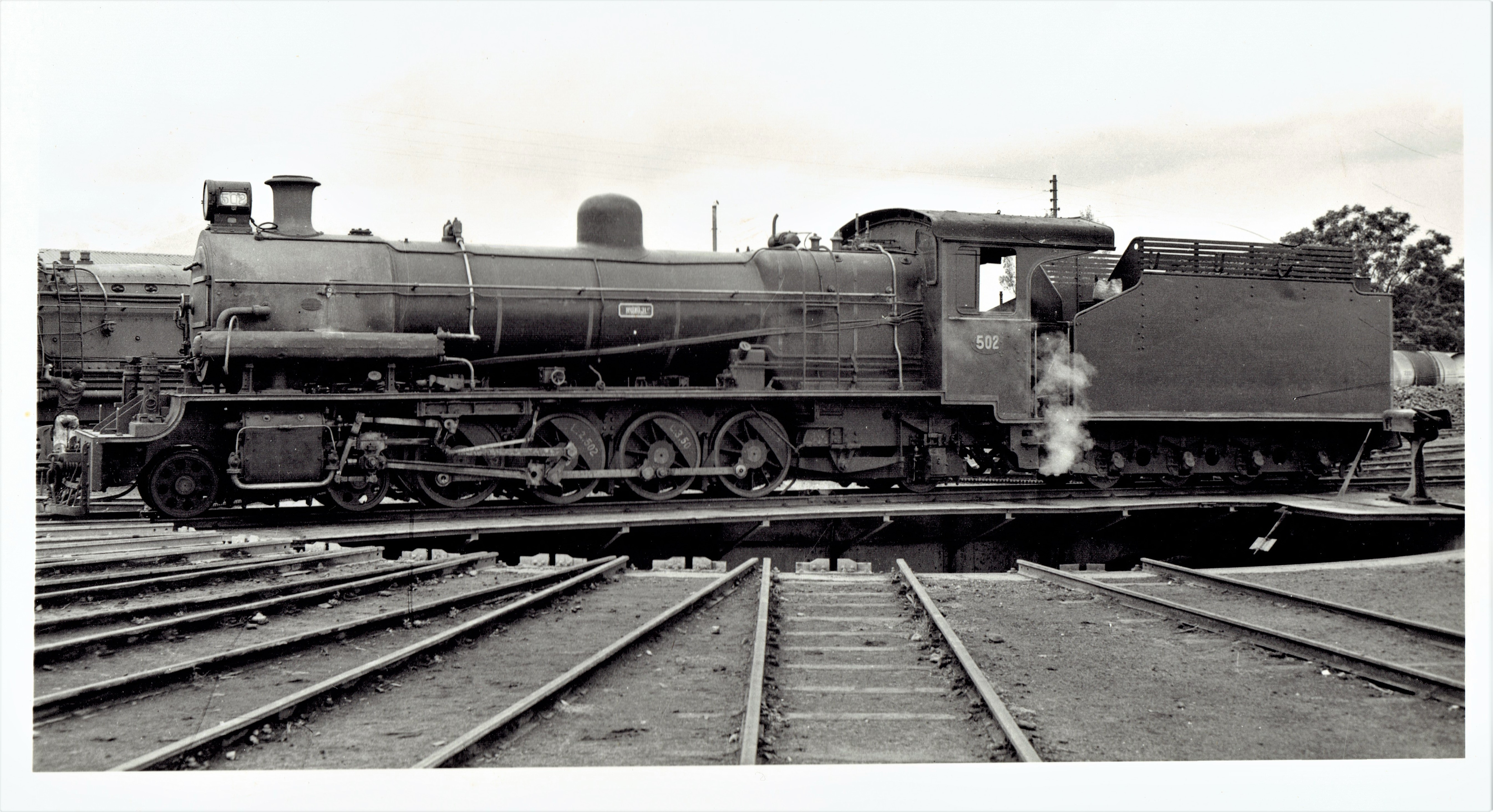
- East African Railways publicity photograph of TR no. 252, c. 1953
Type and origin
- Power type: Steam
- Builder: Vulcan Foundry
- Serial number: 4318–4320, 4352–4353, 4426, 4447–4448
- Build date: 1928–1930
- Total produced: 8
Specifications
- Configuration
  - Whyte: 4-8-2
  - UIC: 2′D1' h2
- Gauge: 1,000 mm (3 ft 3 3/8 in)
- Driver dia.: 43 in (1,092 mm)
- Adhesive weight: 39.8 long tons (40.4 t)
- Loco weight: 59.8 long tons (60.8 t)
- Fuel type: Oil
- Fuel capacity: 1,300 imp gal (5,900 L; 1,600 US gal)
- Water cap.: 3,500 imp gal (16,000 L; 4,200 US gal)
- Firebox
  - Grate area: 27 sq ft (2.51 m^{2})
- Boiler pressure: 160 psi (1.10 MPa) (165 psi (1.14 MPa))
- Heating surface
  - Firebox: 139 sq ft (12.9 m^{2})
  - Tubes: 1,306 sq ft (121.3 m^{2})
  - Total surface: 1,742 sq ft (161.8 m^{2})
- Superheater
  - Heating area: 297 sq ft (27.6 m^{2})
- Cylinders: 2
- Cylinder size: 18 in × 23 in (457 mm × 584 mm)
Performance figures
- Tractive effort: 24,300 lbf (108.09 kN)
Career
- Operators: Tanganyika Railway (TR); → East African Railways (EAR)
- Class: TR: RV class; EAR: 21 class
- Number in class: 8
- Numbers: TR: 250–257/500–507; EAR: 2101–2108
- Delivered: 1928–1930

The TR RV class, later known as the EAR 21 class, was a class of 1,000 mm (3 ft 3 3/8 in) gauge steam locomotives designed and built for the Tanganyika Railway (TR) as a 4-8-2 development of the 2-8-2 TR MK class. The eight members of the RV class were built by Vulcan Foundry, in Newton-le-Willows, Lancashire (now part of Merseyside), England.

The "RV" class designation was short for "River", as each RV class locomotive was named after a river in the Tanganyika Territory. The class entered service on the TR between 1928 and 1930, and its members were later operated by the TR's successor, the East African Railways (EAR).

== Class list ==
The builder's and fleet numbers, and names, of each member of the class were as follows:

Builder's number	1st TR number	2nd TR number	EAR number	Name	Notes
4318	250	500	2101	Kalambo	
4319	251	501	2102	Ruvuma	
4320	252	502	2103	Rufiji	
4352	253	503	2104	Pangani	
4353	254	504	2105	Ruaha	
4426	255	505	2106	Kagera	
4447	256	506	2107	Lukuedi	
4448	257	507	2108	Lupa	

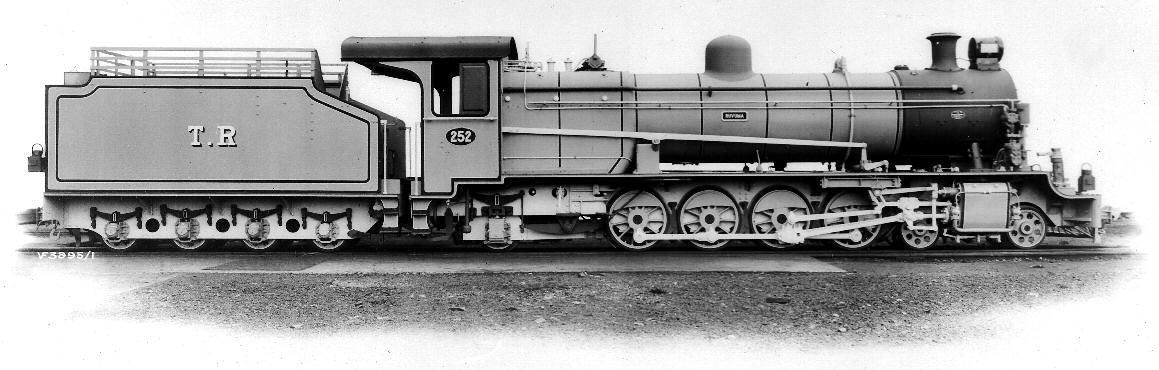
Vulcan Foundry works photo of TR 252

== See also ==
- History of rail transport in Tanzania
- Rail transport in Kenya
- Rail transport in Uganda
