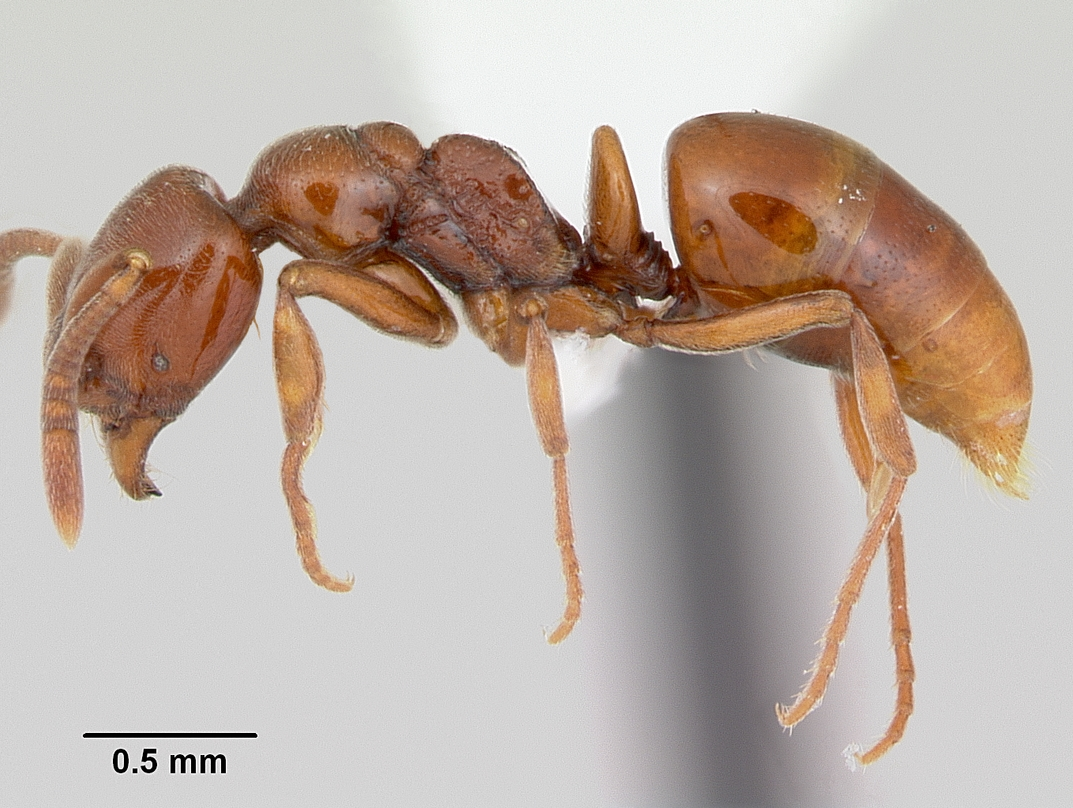
- Asphinctopone silvestrii worker from Gabon

Scientific classification
- Kingdom: Animalia
- Phylum: Arthropoda
- Clade: Pancrustacea
- Class: Insecta
- Order: Hymenoptera
- Family: Formicidae
- Subfamily: Ponerinae
- Tribe: Ponerini
- Alliance: Odontomachus genus group
- Genus: Asphinctopone; Santschi, 1914

Type species
- Asphinctopone silvestrii Santschi, 1914

Diversity
- 3 species

Synonyms
- Lepidopone Bernard, 1953

= Asphinctopone =

Genus of ants

Asphinctopone is a small genus of rarely encountered Afrotropical ants in the subfamily Ponerinae.

== Species ==
- Asphinctopone differens Bolton & Fisher, 2008
- Asphinctopone pilosa Hawkes, 2010
- Asphinctopone silvestrii Santschi, 1914

== Habitat and distribution ==
The three recognized species are known from the wet forest zones of West and Central Africa and from the Kilindi Forest Reserve in Tanzania. Asphinctopone are very rarely encountered; whether this is due to actual rarity of members of the genus, or to a secretive and perhaps deeply subterranean lifestyle, is unknown. Specimens are seldom found and most samples recovered consist of only one or two workers. As a measure of its rarity, a survey of leaf litter in Ghana recorded 43,824 individual ants, of which only 5 (about 0.01%) were Asphinctopone. Despite this rarity, the genus is widespread in wet forest zones in leaf litter, topsoil, pieces of rotten wood and rotting vegetation on the forest floor. One worker has been found foraging in a fallen, abandoned termitary. Beyond this nothing is known of its biology. Its specialized morphology implies that it may be prey-specific, but its victims remain unknown.

== Taxonomy ==
The genus was first described by Santschi (1914) with a single species, A. silvestrii. Two more species were subsequently described: A. lucidus (Weber 1949) and A. lamottei (Bernard 1953), the latter originally ascribed by Bernard to a new genus, Lepidopone, but subsequently placed in Asphinctopone by Brown (1953). In a recent revision of the genus, Bolton & Fisher (2008) synonymised all three previously described species and described one additional species, bringing the total number of described species to two. Of these A. differens (Bolton & Fisher 2008) is known only from the holotype (collected in the Central African Republic), while A. silvestrii (now including A. lucidus and A. lamottei) has been recorded multiple times in West and Central Africa (Bolton & Fisher 2008). A third species, A. pilosa, was described by Hawkes (2010) from a single specimen the Kilindi Forest Reserve (Kilindi District, Tanzania).
