= TR GSL class =

Tanganyika Railway GSL class
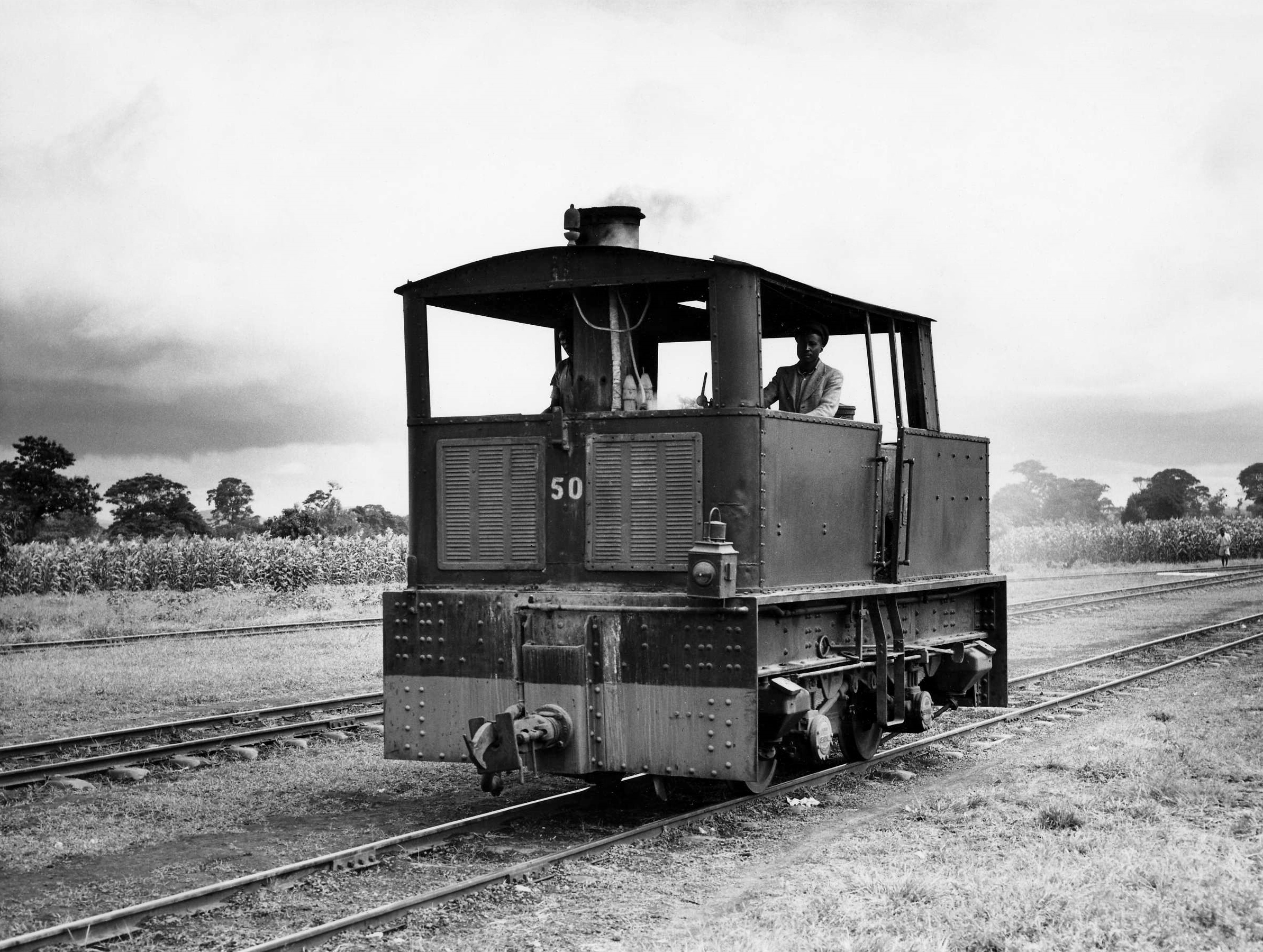
- Portrait of TR GSL 50
Type and origin
- Power type: Steam
- Builder: Sentinel Waggon Works
- Build date: 1929–1931
- Total produced: 8
Specifications
- Configuration
  - Whyte: 0-4-0T
- Gauge: 1,000 mm (3 ft 3 3/8 in)
Career
- Operators: Tanganyika Railway (TR); → East African Railways (EAR)
- Class: GSL class
- Numbers: TR: 1–8 / 51–58; EAR: 51–58
- Disposition: All scrapped

The TR GSL class was a class of 1,000 mm (3 ft 3 3/8 in) gauge 0-4-0T geared steam locomotives built by Sentinel Waggon Works in Shrewsbury, Shropshire, England, for the Tanganyika Railway (TR).

The eight members of the GSL class entered service on the TR between 1929 and 1931. They were operated by the TR until it was succeeded by the East African Railways (EAR) in 1948. They then served with the EAR until the mid-1950s.

== See also ==
- History of rail transport in Tanzania
