= Handeni–Kiberashi–Chemba–Kwa Mtoro–Singida Road =

Road in Tanzania

Coordinates: 04°59′05″S 35°55′21″E

Handeni–Singida Road

Route information
- Length: 373 mi (600 km)

Major junctions
- East end: Handeni
- Chemba, Kwa_Mtoro
- West end: Singida

Location
- Country: Tanzania

Highway system
- Transport in Tanzania

The Handeni–Kiberashi–Chemba–Kwa_Mtoro–Singida Road, also Handeni–Singida Road, is a road in Tanzania, connecting the towns of Handeni, and Singida in Tanzania.

== Location ==
The eastern end of the road is in Handeni, in Handeni District, Tanga Region, about 159 kilometres (99 mi), south-west of the port of Tanga, on the Indian Ocean coast. From here, the road stretches westwards for approximately 280 kilometres (174 mi) to a location near Kondoa, in Kondoa District, Dodoma Region.

From there, the road travels in a south-westerly direction to Kwa Mtoro, a distance of about 61 kilometres (38 mi). From Kwa Mtoro, the road continues in a north-westerly direction to end at Singida, in Singida Region, approximately 100 kilometres (62 mi) from Kwa Mtoro.

== Upgrades and reconstruction ==
This road, connects the regions of Tanga, Dodoma and Singida. It tracks the general direction of the East African Crude Oil Pipeline from Hoima, in Uganda to Chongoleani in Tanzania.

The government of Tanzania has plans to upgrade this road to class-2 bitumen surface and improvement of drainage channels and culverts. In May 2018, the government availed TZS:1 billion (approx. US$440,000), as a down-payment on the project, including the resettlement of the affected people.

== See also ==
- List of roads in Tanzania
- Transport in Tanzania
