= Mlimani, Handeni =

Ward in Handeni Urban District, Tanga Region

Mlimani Kata ya Mlimani (Swahili)
- Ward
- Kata ya Mlimani, Wilaya ya Handeni Mjini
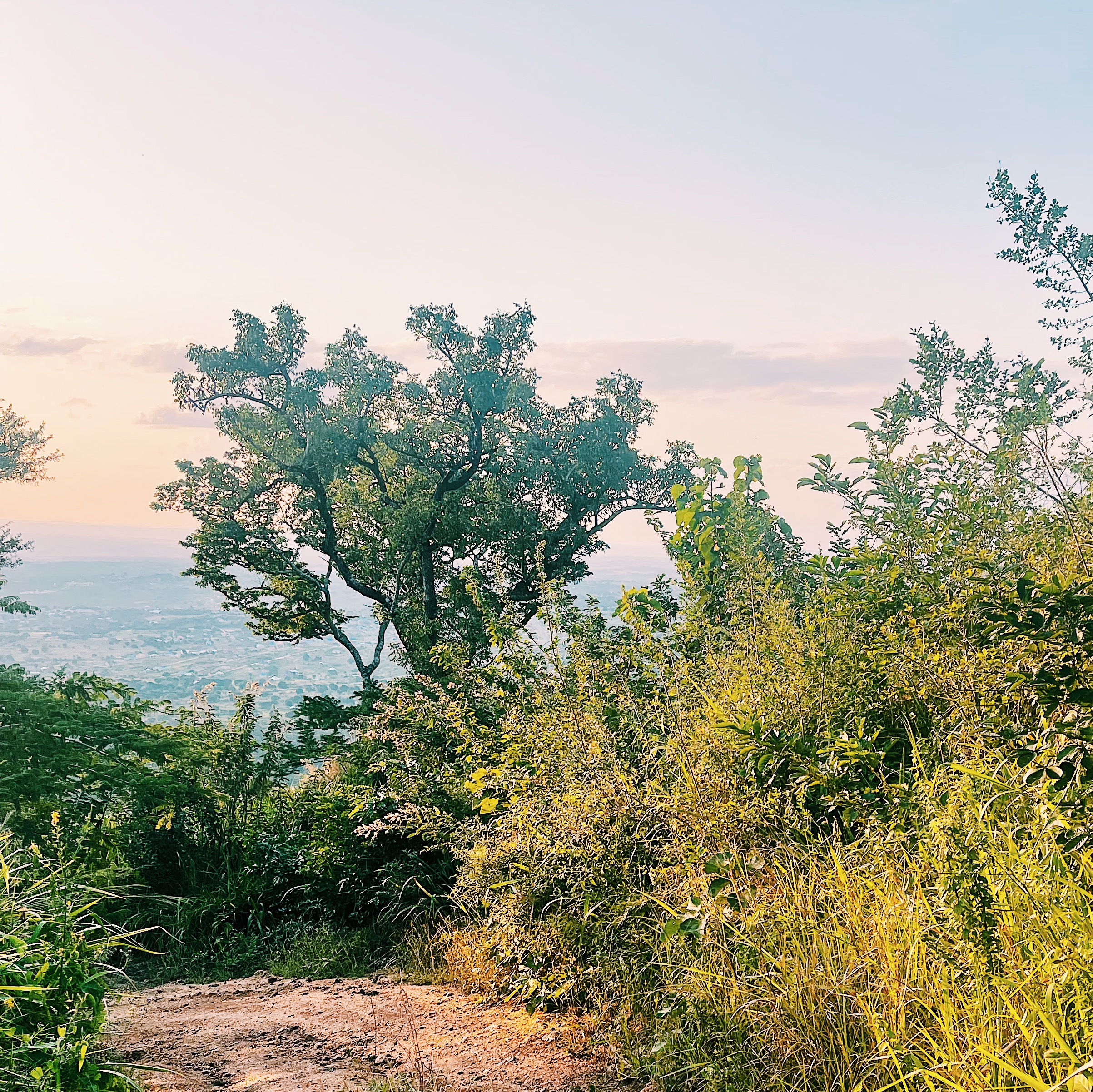
- View of Town from Mlimani Ward, Handeni Urban
- Nickname: The roof of Handeni Town
- Location within Tanzania
- Country: Tanzania
- Region: Tanga Region
- District: Handeni Town Council

Area
  - Total: 49.6 km^{2} (19.2 sq mi)
- Elevation: 766 m (2,513 ft)

Population (2012)
  - Total: 5,252
  - Density: 106/km^{2} (274/sq mi)

Ethnic groups
  - Settler: Swahili
  - Ancestral: Zigua
- Tanzanian Postal Code: 21824

Mlimani is an administrative ward in Handeni Town Council of the Tanga Region in Tanzania. It covers an area of 49.6 km^{2} (19.2 sq mi), and has an average elevation of 766 m (2,513 ft). As of the 2012 census, the population is 5,252.
