= Kilindi District =

District of Tanga Region, Tanzania

Kilindi Wilaya ya Kilindi (Swahili)
- District
- Wilaya ya Kilindi, Mkoa wa Tanga
- Nickname: The royal crown of Tanga
- Kilindi District in Tanga Region 2022
- Coordinates: 5°33′54.72″S 37°33′12.6″E
- Country: Tanzania
- Region: Tanga Region
- District: 2002
- Capital: Songe

Area
  - Total: 6,444 km^{2} (2,488 sq mi)
  - Rank: 2/11

Population (2022)
  - Total: 398,391
  - Density: 61.82/km^{2} (160.1/sq mi)
- Demonym: Kilindian

Ethnic groups
  - Settler: Swahili
  - Native: Nguu & Zigua

Kilindi is one of eleven administrative districts of Tanga Region in Tanzania. The District covers an area of 6,444 km^{2} (2,488 sq mi). It is bordered to the east by the Handeni District and Handeni Town Council, to the south west by the Kiteto District and north west by the Simanjiro District of Manyara Region. Kilindi District is bordered to the south by Gairo District and Kilosa District of Morogoro Region. The district created from Handeni District in 2002. The district seat (capital) is the town of Songe. The district is home to Nguu Mountains. According to the 2022 census, the district has a total population of 398,391.

== Etymology ==
Kilindi district is named after the Kilindi Dynasty that ruled over western Tanga in the 18-20th century.

== Administrative subdivisions ==
As of 2012, Kilindi District was administratively divided into 21 wards.

=== Wards ===
1. Jaila
2. Kibirashi
3. Kikunde
4. Kilindi
5. Kilwa
6. Kimbe
7. Kisangasa
8. Kwediboma
9. Kwekivu
10. Lwande
11. Mabalanga
12. Masagalu
13. Mkindi
14. Msanja
15. Mafisa
16. Bokwa
17. Negero
18. Pagwi
19. Saunyi
20. Songe
21. Tunguli
