= Vibaoni =

Ward in Handeni Urban District, Tanga Region

Vibaoni Kata ya Vibaoni (Swahili)
- Ward
- Kata ya Vibaoni, Wilaya ya Handeni Mjini
- Location within Tanzania
- Country: Tanzania
- Region: Tanga Region
- District: Handeni Town Council

Area
  - Total: 16.2 km^{2} (6.3 sq mi)
- Elevation: 802 m (2,631 ft)

Population (2012)
  - Total: 6,078
  - Density: 375/km^{2} (972/sq mi)

Ethnic groups
  - Settler: Swahili
  - Ancestral: Zigua
- Tanzanian Postal Code: 21802

Vibaoni is an administrative ward in Handeni Town Council of Tanga Region in Tanzania. The ward covers an area of 16.2 km^{2} (6.3 sq mi), and has an average elevation of 802 m (2,631 ft). According to the 2012 census, the ward has a total population of 6,078.
