= Msasa, Handeni =

Ward in Handeni Urban District, Tanga Region

Msasa Kata ya Msasa (Swahili)
- Ward
- Kata ya Msasa, Wilaya ya Handeni Mjini
- Location within Tanzania
- Country: Tanzania
- Region: Tanga Region
- District: Handeni Town Council

Area
  - Total: 26.5 km^{2} (10.2 sq mi)
- Elevation: 753 m (2,470 ft)

Population (2012)
  - Total: 4,328
  - Density: 163/km^{2} (423/sq mi)

Ethnic groups
  - Settler: Swahili
  - Ancestral: Zigua
- Tanzanian Postal Code: 21825

Msasa is an administrative ward in Handeni Town Council of Tanga Region in Tanzania. The ward covers an area of 26.5 km^{2} (10.2 sq mi), and has an average elevation of 753 m (2,470 ft). According to the 2012 census, the ward has a total population of 4,328.
