= Nguu Mountains =

Mountain range in Tanga Region of Tanzania

- Milima ya Nguu (Swahili)

Highest point
- Elevation: 1,550 m (5,090 ft)

Geography
- Country: Tanzania
- Region: Tanga Region
- District: Kilindi District
- Range coordinates: 06°10′S 37°30′E
- Parent range: Eastern Arc Mountains

The Nguu Mountains also known as Nguru Mountains or Ngulu Mountains (Milima ya Nguu in Swahili) are a mountain range in eastern Tanzania. The mountains are administratively located in the Tanga Region, specifically in the Kilindi District. The mountains are named for the Ngulu people. The Nguu Mountains are part of the Eastern Arc Mountains. The mountains are covered in woodland, grassland, and forest.

== Geography ==
The Nguu Mountains are a dissected range covering area of 1591 km^{2}. The highest elevation is 1550 meters. The range lies in the watershed of the Wami River and its tributaries. The Nguru Mountains lie to the south, across an expanse of hilly country. The Maasai Steppe lies to the north and west.

== Climate ==
The Nguru mountains intercept moisture-laden winds from the Indian Ocean, which provide most of the rainfall in the mountains. Most of the rainfall occurs in the November-to-May wet season, although mist and light rain occur at higher elevations during the dry season months. Rainfall is higher on the southern and eastern slopes, and lower in the mountains' rain shadow to the north and west. Temperatures are cooler and rainfall is higher at higher elevations.

== Geology ==
The Nguu Mountains, along with the others in the Eastern Arc, are made up of ancient crystalline Precambrian rocks that were uplifted over millions of years along fault lines. The most recent period of uplift started 30 million years ago, but the fault system and uplift process may be far older. Soils derived from these ancient rocks are not as fertile as the younger volcanic soils of mountains to the north and west.

== Flora and fauna ==
About thirty million years ago, the area was covered by extensive rainforest. During a cooler and drier period some ten million years ago, the lowland forests were converted to savanna, leaving the mountain ranges as "islands" where the tropical forests continued to flourish. The long-term persistence of a humid climate and the isolation of each mountain range has led to a great deal of endemism, and a very diverse flora and fauna. The Nguu and other Eastern Arc mountains have extremely high biodiversity with numerous endemic species (more than 25 percent of the vertebrate species).

The Nguu mountains mark the northernmost extent of the Eastern miombo woodlands. Drier Northern Acacia–Commiphora bushlands and thickets lie to the north and west. The mountains support enclaves of forest, mostly between 1000 and 1550 meters elevation. The forests vary in species composition with elevation and the direction of the slope. Pockets of lowland forest are found below 1000 meters elevation in the eastern portion of the mountains, although many have been cleared for cultivation. They have a flora similar to the humid Zanzibar–Inhambane coastal forests further east, with Milicia excelsa and Khaya anthotheca as dominant trees.

The forests from 1000 to 1500 meters elevation are principally evergreen submontane forests, with characteristic Afromontane species. Newtonia buchananii is the dominant tree, with Albizia gummifera and other species. An analysis of satellite images taken between 1999 and 2003 found 188 km^{2} of the mountains were still covered in evergreen forest.

== Protected areas and conservation ==
The mountains have several Catchment Forest Reserves which preserve lowland and submontane forests: Derema CFR (3,928 ha), Kilindi CFR (4,299 ha), Kwediboma CFR (285 ha), Mbwegere CFR (368 ha), Mkongo CFR (985 ha), Mkuli CFR (2,931 ha), Nguru North CFR (14,042 ha), Pumila CFR (1,062 ha) and Rudewa CFR (556 ha).
