= Jaila =

Ward in Kilindi District, Tanga Region

Jaila Kata ya Jaila (Swahili)
- Ward
- Kata ya Jaila, Wilaya ya Kilindi
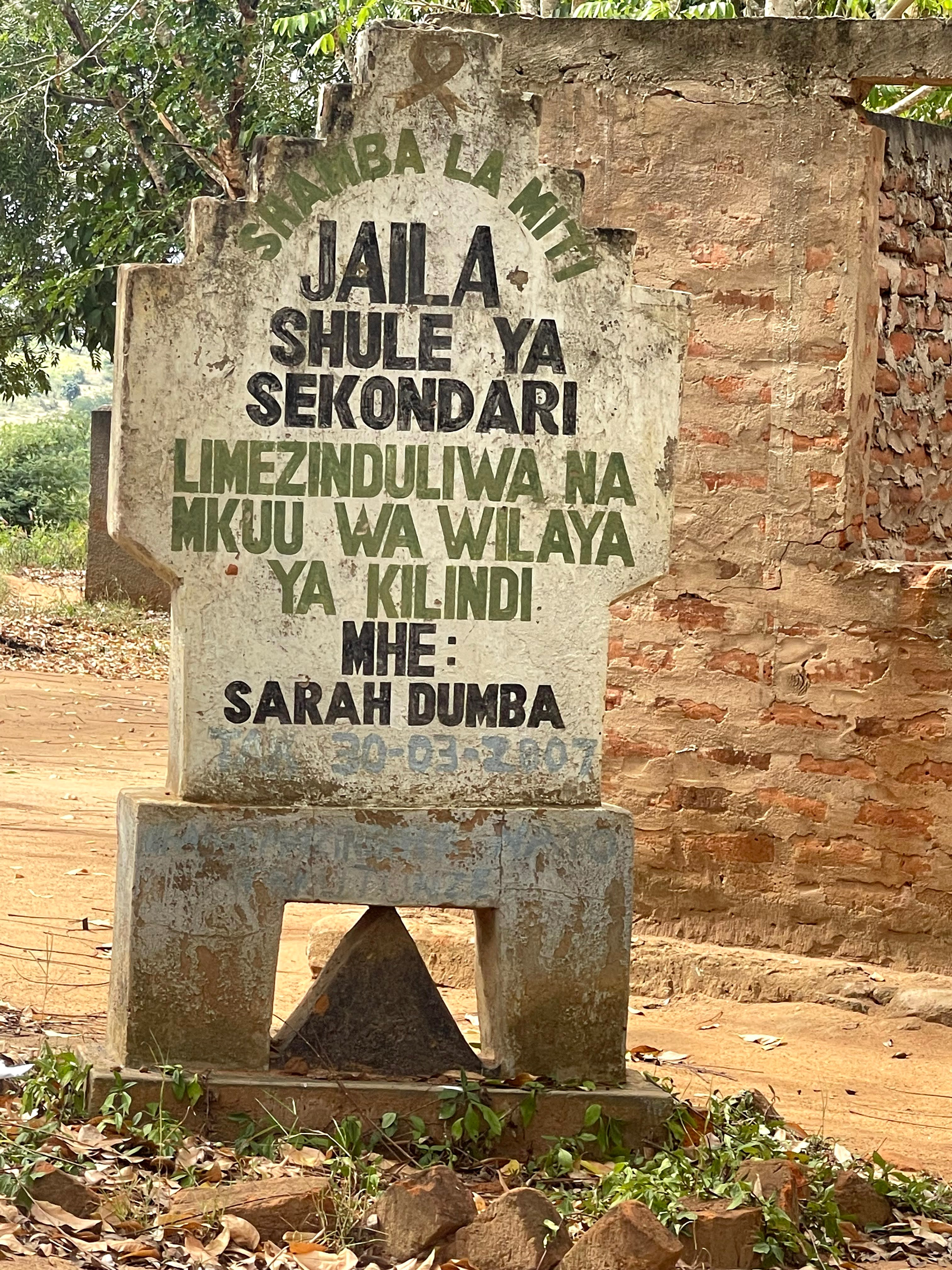
- Jaila Secondary School Sign, jaila Ward, Kilindi District

- Location within Tanzania
- Country: Tanzania
- Region: Tanga Region
- District: Kilindi District

Area
  - Total: 157 km^{2} (61 sq mi)
- Elevation: 733 m (2,405 ft)

Population (2012)
  - Total: 12,319
  - Density: 78.5/km^{2} (203/sq mi)

Ethnic groups
  - Settler: Swahili
  - Native: Nguu
- Tanzanian Postal Code: 21913

Jaila is an administrative ward in Kilindi District of Tanga Region in Tanzania. The ward covers an area of 157 km^{2} (61 sq mi), and has an average elevation of 733 m (2,405 ft). According to the 2012 census, the ward has a total population of 12,319.
