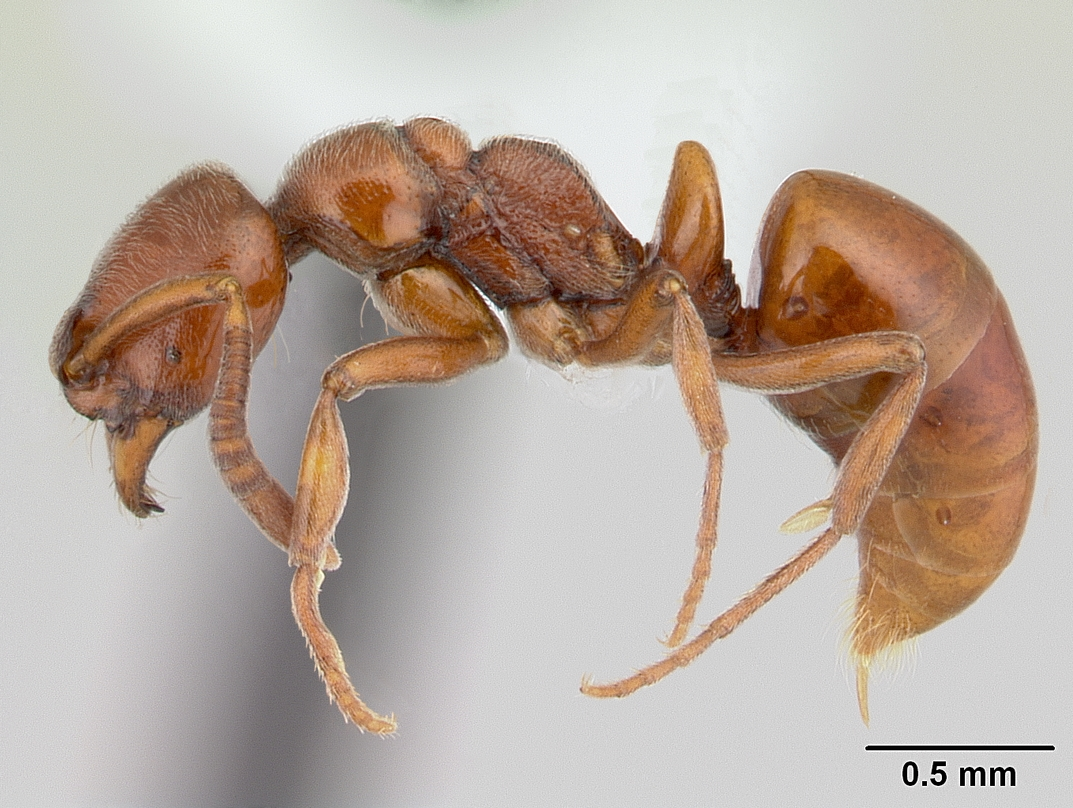
- Asphinctopone differens worker

Scientific classification
- Domain: Eukaryota
- Kingdom: Animalia
- Phylum: Arthropoda
- Class: Insecta
- Order: Hymenoptera
- Family: Formicidae
- Genus: Asphinctopone
- Species: A. differens

Binomial name
- Asphinctopone differens Bolton & Fisher, 2008

= Asphinctopone differens =

Species of ant

Asphinctopone differens is a species of ant in the subfamily Ponerinae.
