= Second colonial occupation =

Phase of British colonial rule in Sub-Saharan Africa after 1945

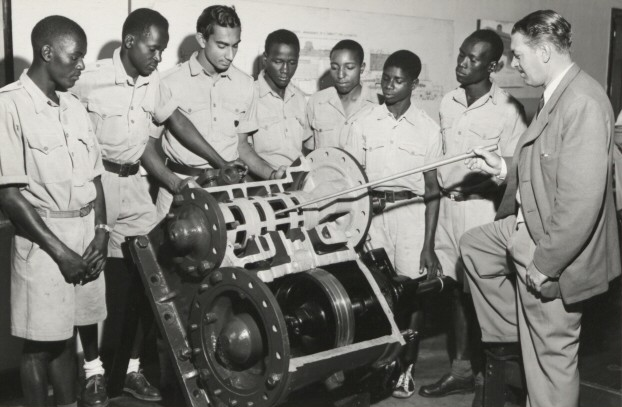
A European instructor lectures African students on the functioning of a steam engine in East Africa, c.1950

Second colonial occupation is a term coined by the historians Anthony Low and John Lonsdale to describe the phase of British colonial rule in Sub-Saharan Africa beginning in the aftermath of World War II. It was characterised by "a great intensification of government activity" and new focus on economic development.

Low and Lonsdale originally coined the term in the edited volume History of East Africa (1976) to refer to a specific period in the history of Britain's colonies in East Africa. The term has subsequently been widely applied by other historians as a form of periodisation in other historical contexts, although primarily within the historiography of Sub-Saharan Africa.

== Concept ==
According to Anthony Low and John Lonsdale, the "second colonial occupation" represented a distinct period in British colonial rule which began after World War II, running approximately from 1945 to 1963, which followed a first "occupation" that had lost momentum after the era of New Imperialism. This argument was first made in an article entitled "East Africa: Towards a New Order, 1945-1963", published in the third volume of the History of East Africa (1976). Low and Lonsdale wrote:

From the late 1940s there was a great intensification of government activity throughout British Africa; in contrast to earlier years, and to the recent war period when territories were drained of staff, this access of official energy amounted to a second colonial occupation. It had a variety of causes.

According to Low and Lonsdale, the first "colonial occupation" had occurred at the time of colonial conquest in the era of New Imperialism which had based claims for colonial sovereignty on effective occupation of territory before World War I. As a result of budgetary constraints and the Great Depression, colonial administration had become increasingly reliant on simple extraction of resources and on indirect rule. This meant that the number of European administrators, employees, and officials could be kept low.

The British Empire accumulated significant dollar-denominated debts to the United States during World War II. As such, it was necessary to reduce foreign-currency imports and believed that colonial agricultural produce could replace products previously acquired overseas. This would involve a restructuring of African economies "in the interests of the British consumer", a process which would require greater investment in terms of manpower and investment. Large numbers of European experts, such as agronomists and anthropologists, were recruited to improve African agricultural processes and the state invested in large centrally planned economic projects such as the Tanganyika groundnut scheme (1946–51). This led to unprecedented state interference in the day-to-day lives of the colonial population, especially peasants, helping to drive the emergence of popular African anti-colonial nationalism.

The move towards "development" or "trusteeship" in colonial policy is often traced to the Colonial Development and Welfare Act 1940 or the wartime ideals exemplified by the Atlantic Charter. It has been argued that there was a continuity between the ethos of the second colonial occupation and the post-colonial focus on economic development.

== See also ==
- Fonds d'Investissements pour le Developpement Economique et Social — French colonial development agency founded in 1946.
- Dutch Ethical Policy (1901–42)
