= Handeni Town Council =

District of Tanga Region, Tanzania

Handeni Mjini Wilaya ya Handeni Mjini (Swahili)
- District
- Wilaya ya Handeni Mjini, Mkoa wa Tanga
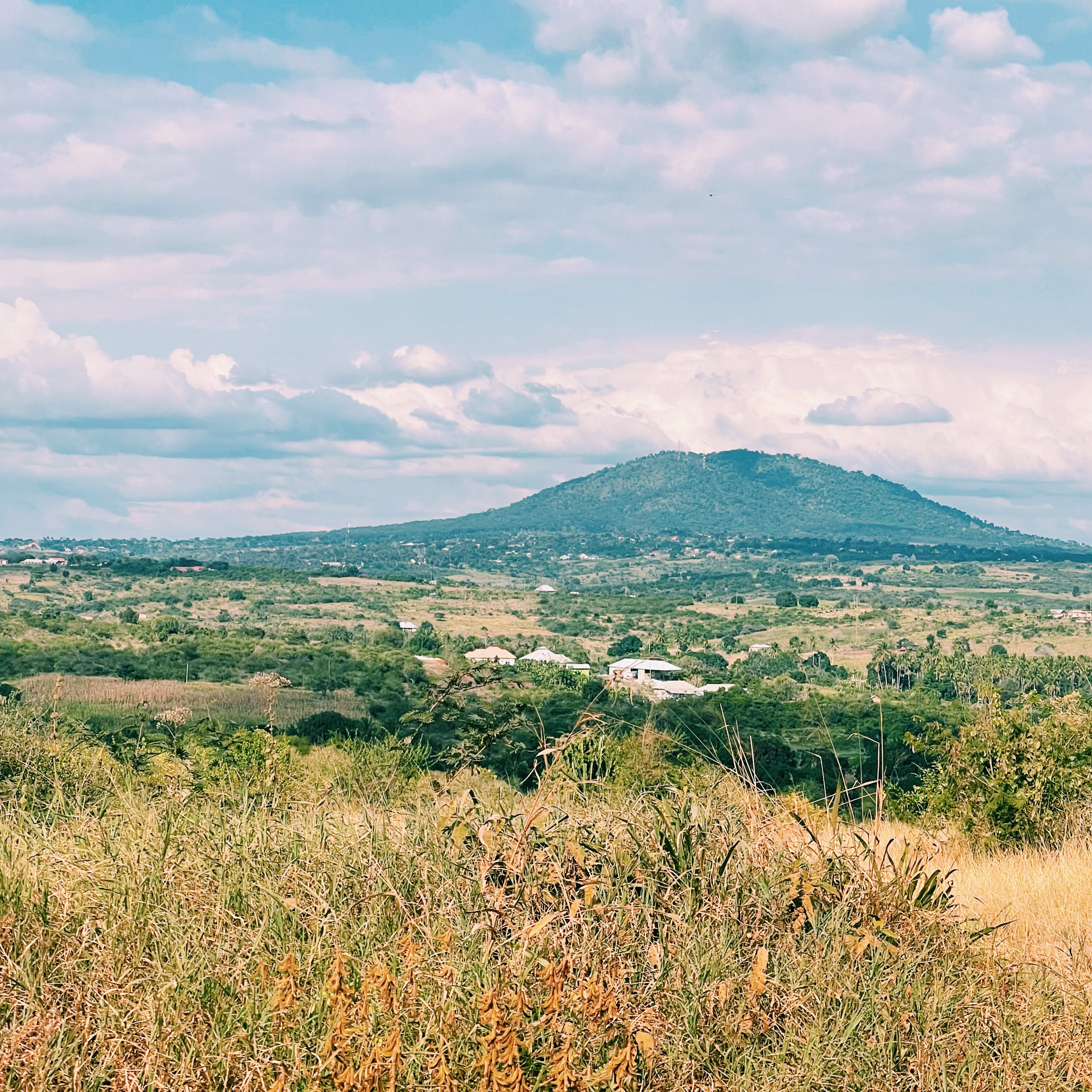
- View of Handeni Town from Kwediyamba Ward, Handeni Urban
- Nickname: Tanga's magicland
- Handeni Town in Tanga 2022
- Coordinates: 5°25′24.96″S 38°1′33.96″E
- Country: Tanzania
- Region: Tanga Region

Area
  - District: 837.4 km^{2} (323.3 sq mi)

Population (2022 census)
  - District: 108,968
  - Density: 130.1/km^{2} (337.0/sq mi)
  - Urban: 108,968
- Demonym: Town Handenian

Ethnic groups
  - Settler: Swahili
  - Ancestral: Zigula
- Website: handenitc.go.tz

Handeni Town Council also known as Handeni Urban District is one of the 11 districts of the Tanga Region of Tanzania. The district covers an area of 837.4 km^{2} (323.3 sq mi). The administrative capital of the district is Mdoe. Handeni Town District is bordered to the east by Handeni District and the west by Kilindi District.

== Administrative subdivisions ==
As of 2012, Handeni Town Council was administratively divided into 12 wards.

=== Wards ===
1. Chanika
2. Kideleko
3. Konje
4. Kwamagome
5. Kwediyamba
6. Kwenjugo
7. Mabanda
8. Malezi
9. Mdoe
10. Mlimani
11. Msasa
12. Vibaoni

== Transport ==
A paved secondary road connects Handeni with Korogwe in the northeast and Mkata in the southeast; both Korogwe and Mkata are on the T2 Trunk road from Dar es Salaam to Arusha.
