= Kimbe, Tanga =

Ward in Tanga Region, Tanzania

Kimbe Kata ya Kimbe (Swahili)
- Ward
- Kata ya Kimbe, Wilaya ya Kilindi
- Location within Tanzania
- Country: Tanzania
- Region: Tanga Region
- District: Kilindi District

Area
  - Total: 464.3 km^{2} (179.3 sq mi)
- Elevation: 626 m (2,054 ft)

Population (2012)
  - Total: 14,249
  - Density: 30.69/km^{2} (79.48/sq mi)

Ethnic groups
  - Settler: Swahili
  - Ancestral: Nguu
- Tanzanian Postal Code: 21915

Kimbe is an administrative ward in Kilindi District of Tanga Region in Tanzania. The ward covers an area of 464 km^{2} (179 sq mi), and has an average elevation of 626 m (2,054 ft). According to the 2012 census, the ward has a total population of 14,249.
