= Songe, Kilindi =

Ward in Kilindi District, Tanga Region

Songe Kata ya Songe (Swahili)
- Ward
- Kata ya Songe, Wilaya ya Kilindi
- Location within Tanzania
- Country: Tanzania
- Region: Tanga Region
- District: Kilindi District

Area
  - Total: 90 km^{2} (35 sq mi)
- Elevation: 1,272 m (4,173 ft)

Population (2012)
  - Total: 14,801
  - Density: 160/km^{2} (430/sq mi)

Ethnic groups
  - Settler: Swahili
  - Ancestral: Nguu
- Tanzanian Postal Code: 21901

Songe is an administrative ward in Kilindi District of Tanga Region in Tanzania. The ward covers an area of 90 km^{2} (35 sq mi), and has an average elevation of 1,272 m (4,173 ft). According to the 2012 census, the ward has a total population of 14,801.
