= Mdoe =

Ward in Handeni Urban District, Tanga Region

Mdoe Kata ya Mdoe (Swahili)
- Ward
- Kata ya Mdoe, Wilaya ya Handeni Mjini
- Location within Tanzania
- Country: Tanzania
- Region: Tanga Region
- District: Handeni Town Council

Area
  - Total: 4.6 km^{2} (1.8 sq mi)
- Elevation: 808 m (2,651 ft)

Population (2012)
  - Total: 9,541
  - Density: 2,100/km^{2} (5,400/sq mi)

Ethnic groups
  - Settler: Swahili
  - Ancestral: Zigua
- Tanzanian Postal Code: 21827

Mdoe is an administrative ward in Handeni Town Council of Tanga Region in Tanzania. The ward covers an area of 4.6 km^{2} (1.8 sq mi), and has an average elevation of 808 m (2,651 ft). According to the 2012 census, the ward has a total population of 9,541. Mode is also the seat of Handeni Town government as all the district council's administration offices are located there.
