= Kilindi, Kilindi =

Ward in Kilindi District, Tanga Region

Kilindi Kata ya Kilindi (Swahili)
- Ward
- Kata ya Kilindi, Wilaya ya Kilindi
- Location within Tanzania
- Country: Tanzania
- Region: Tanga Region
- District: Kilindi District

Area
  - Total: 374.8 km^{2} (144.7 sq mi)
- Elevation: 770 m (2,530 ft)

Population (2012)
  - Total: 11,093
  - Density: 29.60/km^{2} (76.66/sq mi)

Ethnic groups
  - Settler: Swahili
  - Ancestral: Nguu
- Tanzanian Postal Code: 21909

Kilindi is an administrative ward in Kilindi District of Tanga Region in Tanzania. The ward covers an area of 374.8 km^{2} (144.7 sq mi), and has an average elevation of 770 m (2,530 ft). According to the 2012 census, the ward has a total population of 11,093.
