= Chanika, Handeni =

Ward in Tanga Region, Tanzania

Chanika Kata ya Chanika (Swahili)
- Ward
- Kata ya Chanika, Wilaya ya Handeni Mjini
- Location within Tanzania
- Country: Tanzania
- Region: Tanga Region
- District: Handeni Town Council

Area
  - Total: 4.1 km^{2} (1.6 sq mi)
- Elevation: 671 m (2,201 ft)

Population (2012)
  - Total: 10,994
  - Density: 2,700/km^{2} (6,900/sq mi)

Ethnic groups
  - Settler: Swahili
  - Ancestral: Zigua
- Tanzanian Postal Code: 21801

Chanika is an administrative ward in Handeni Town Council of Tanga Region in Tanzania. The ward covers an area of 4.1 km^{2} (1.6 sq mi), and has an average elevation of 671 m (2,201 ft). According to the 2012 census, the ward has a total population of 10,994.
