= Kwediyamba =

Ward in Handeni Urban District, Tanga Region

Kwediyamba Kata ya Kwediyamba (Swahili)
- Ward
- Kata ya Kwediyamba, Wilaya ya Handeni Mjini
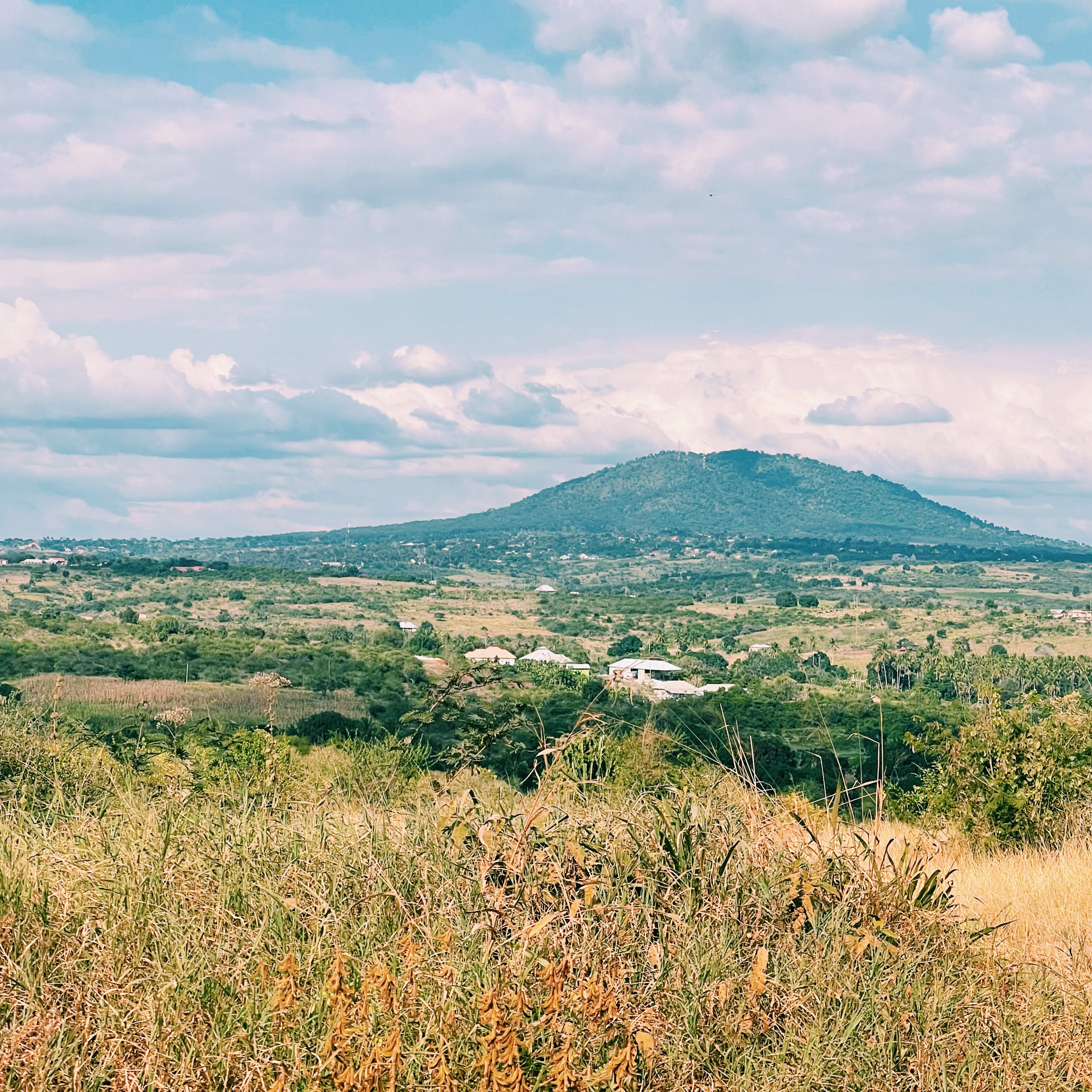
- View of Handeni Town from Kwediyamba Ward, Handeni Urban

- Location within Tanzania
- Country: Tanzania
- Region: Tanga Region
- District: Handeni Town Council

Area
  - Total: 30.4 km^{2} (11.7 sq mi)
- Elevation: 665 m (2,182 ft)

Population (2012)
  - Total: 4,142
  - Density: 136/km^{2} (353/sq mi)

Ethnic groups
  - Settler: Swahili
  - Ancestral: Zigua
- Tanzanian Postal Code: 21828

Kwediyamba is an administrative ward in Handeni Town Council of Tanga Region in Tanzania. The ward covers an area of 30.4 km^{2} (11.7 sq mi), and has an average elevation of 665 m (2,182 ft). According to the 2012 census, the ward has a total population of 4,152.
