= Kilwa, Tanga =

Ward in Kilindi District, Tanga Region

Kilwa Kata ya Kilwa (Swahili)
- Ward
- Kata ya Kilwa, Wilaya ya Kilindi
- Location within Tanzania
- Country: Tanzania
- Region: Tanga Region
- District: Kilindi District

Area
  - Total: 153 km^{2} (59 sq mi)
- Elevation: 858 m (2,815 ft)

Population (2012)
  - Total: 6,835
  - Density: 44.7/km^{2} (116/sq mi)

Ethnic groups
  - Settler: Swahili
  - Ancestral: Nguu
- Tanzanian Postal Code: 21907

Kilwa is an administrative ward in Kilindi District of Tanga Region in Tanzania. The ward covers an area of 153 km^{2} (59 sq mi), and has an average elevation of 858 m (2,815 ft). According to the 2012 census, the ward has a total population of 6,835.
