= Southern Province Railway =

Rail line in Tanzania

Overview
- Status: closed

History
- Opened: 1949
- Closed: 1963

Technical
- Line length: 275 km (171 mi)
- Track gauge: 1,000 mm (3 ft 3 3/8 in)

The Southern Province Railway was a 1,000 mm (3 ft 3 3/8 in) narrow gauge rail network in Tanzania, which was operated only for a few years in the middle of the 20th Century. It ultimately comprised about 275 route kilometers. The central line of the railway network was Mtwara - Nachingwea. The isolated network operated without connection to the national network. Because of the failure of the Tanganyika Groundnut Scheme the rail system was deprived of its economic existence. After the independence of Tanzania, operations were ceased in February 1963 and the line was abandoned.

== Construction ==
The main reason for the construction was the Tanganyika Groundnut Scheme, as part of the former British colonial rule. The project, whose core component was peanut cultivation on a gigantic scale, ultimately failed. In order to transport the crops, in 1949 the Overseas Food Cooperation put the line Ruo - Nachingwea in operation, it was extended a year later to Lindi on the Indian Ocean. This extension was partly laid on a former 18 km long 600 mm (1 ft 11 5/8 in) feldbahn, constructed in 1921, which ran from a sisal plantation in Lindi to Narunyu.

When the Overseas Food Cooperation ran into financial difficulties in 1952, the railroad was merged with the East African Railways and expanded to a network. As of 1954, the newly built harbor and the port city of Mtwara was connected with Mikindani. In 1958 the route Chilungula-Masasi was constructed.

== Rolling stock ==
Both steam (the series RV/21, G and NZ) and diesel locomotives were used (the series 80 and 81). Passenger traffic existed between Mtwara and Nachingwea for which a second hand Diesel Motorized Units of the former Kenya and Uganda Railways was used.

== See also ==
- History of rail transport in Tanzania
