= Handeni =

- City
- Location of Handeni Handeni (Africa) Handeni (Earth)
- Coordinates: 05°25′27″S 38°01′10″E
- Country: Tanzania
- Region: Tanga Region
- District: Handeni Town Council

Population (2022 census)
  - Total: 108,968
- Time zone: GMT + 3

Handeni is a city located in the Handeni Urban District, Tanga Region, Tanzania. It is the capital of both Handeni Town Council and Handeni District. The 2022 national census estimated the population of Handeni Town Council at 108,968.

== Transport ==
A paved secondary road connects Handeni with Korogwe in the northeast and Mkata in the southeast; both Korogwe and Mkata are on the T2 Trunk road from Dar es Salaam to Arusha. Apparently Handeni is not a city, it is a small township.
