= TR MK class =

Tanganyika Railway MK class; East African Railways 25 class
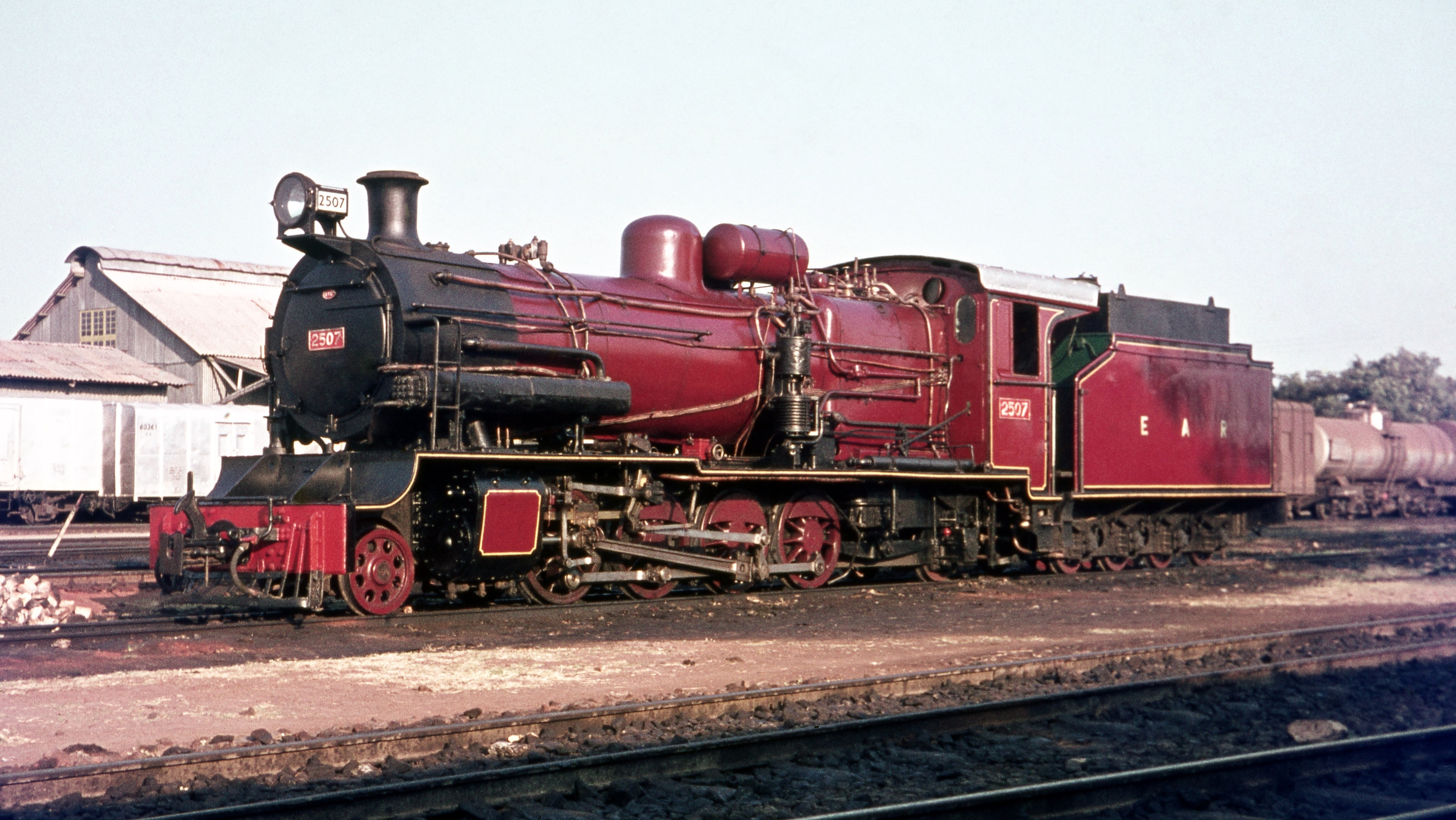
- No. 2507 at Tabora depot, Tanzania, in 1968
Type and origin
- Power type: Steam
- Builder: Vulcan Foundry
- Serial number: 3892–3896 (1925); 3942–3947 (1926)
- Build date: 1925–1926
- Total produced: 11
Specifications
- Configuration
  - Whyte: 2-8-2
  - UIC: 1′D1' h2
- Gauge: 1,000 mm (3 ft 3 3/8 in)
- Driver dia.: 43 in (1,092 mm)
- Adhesive weight: 40.1 long tons (40.7 t)
- Loco weight: 57.7 long tons (58.6 t)
- Fuel type: Oil
- Fuel capacity: 1,300 imp gal (5,900 L; 1,600 US gal)
- Water cap.: 3,500 imp gal (16,000 L; 4,200 US gal)
- Firebox
  - Grate area: 27 sq ft (2.51 m^{2})
- Boiler pressure: 160 psi (1.10 MPa) (165 psi (1.14 MPa))
- Heating surface
  - Firebox: 139 sq ft (12.9 m^{2})
  - Tubes: 1,306 sq ft (121.3 m^{2})
  - Total surface: 1,742 sq ft (161.8 m^{2})
- Superheater
  - Heating area: 297 sq ft (27.6 m^{2})
- Cylinders: 2
- Cylinder size: 18 in × 23 in (457 mm × 584 mm)
Performance figures
- Tractive effort: 24,300 lbf (108.09 kN)
Career
- Operators: Tanganyika Railway (TR); → East African Railways (EAR)
- Class: TR: MK class; EAR: 25 class
- Number in class: 11
- Numbers: TR: 206–216/400–410; EAR: 2501–2511
- Delivered: 1925–1926

The TR MK class, later known as the EAR 25 class, was a class of 1,000 mm (3 ft 3 3/8 in) gauge 2-8-2 steam locomotives. The eleven members of the class were built by Vulcan Foundry, in Newton-le-Willows, Lancashire (now part of Merseyside), England, for the Tanganyika Railway (TR). They entered service on the TR in 1925–1926, and were later operated by the TR's successor, the East African Railways (EAR).

== Class list ==
The builder's number, build year and fleet numbers of each member of the class were as follows:

Builder's number	Built	1st TR number	2nd TR number	EAR number	Notes
3892	1925	206	400	2501	
3893	1925	207	401	2502	
3894	1925	208	402	2503	
3895	1925	209	403	2504	
3896	1925	210	404	2505	
3942	1926	211	405	2506	
3943	1926	212	406	2507	
3944	1926	213	407	2508	
3945	1926	214	408	2509	
3946	1926	215	409	2510	
3947	1926	216	410	2511	

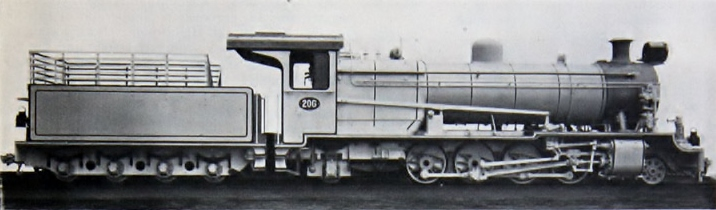
Vulcan Foundry works photo of TR 206

== See also ==
- History of rail transport in Tanzania
- Rail transport in Kenya
- Rail transport in Uganda
