= Fonds d'Investissements pour le Developpement Economique et Social =

The Investment Fund for Economic and Social Development (French: Fonds d'Investissements pour le Developpement Économique et Social, or FIDES) was a development finance institution active in the French colonial empire, notably in Africa. It was established in 1946, as France recalled its earlier policy that colonies should be fully self-sufficient. It existed until 1959 when a decree replaced it with the Fonds d'aide et de coopération (FAC).

== Assessment ==
In 1962, René Dumont criticized the fund from an economic point of view:

"[W]ithin the framework of FIDES very large sums were granted to French-speaking Africa. In face of the immense needs, however, they seemed quite modest. The aid could in fact have been increased many times without a corresponding tax pressure, had France had the courage politically to decolonize more rapidly. Forty-six percent of the FIDES grants, particularly in the first four-year plan, were used to build roads, ports and airports. These were indispensable to open up the countries, but could have been achieved at less cost."

Historian Paul Nugent states that the more recent historical consensus "is that FIDES amounted to much more than an ideological figleaf. It did channel substantial resources into the African colonies - initially (as in the British case) into infrastructural development, but later also into industrial enterprises and agricultural projects." However, this development was mainly directed towards the extraction and transportation of resources. According to historian Catherine Coquery-Vidrovitch, 64% of the budgets went into infrastructural and industrial development to extract products and transport them to the Métropole, while only 18% was consecrated to "social programs" such as literacy or vaccination campaigns. The majority of the 599 billion francs that went to the colonies between 1946 and 1956 ended up being funneled back either to French companies or individual settlers and administrators. Moreover, economist Thomas Piketty asserts that the funds should not be overstated because the portion of the French budget that went into the colonies never surpassed 0,5% of the French GDP, while military expenses to restore order in the colonies surpassed 2% in the same period.
