= Tanganyika groundnut scheme =

Failed development plan in Tanganyika

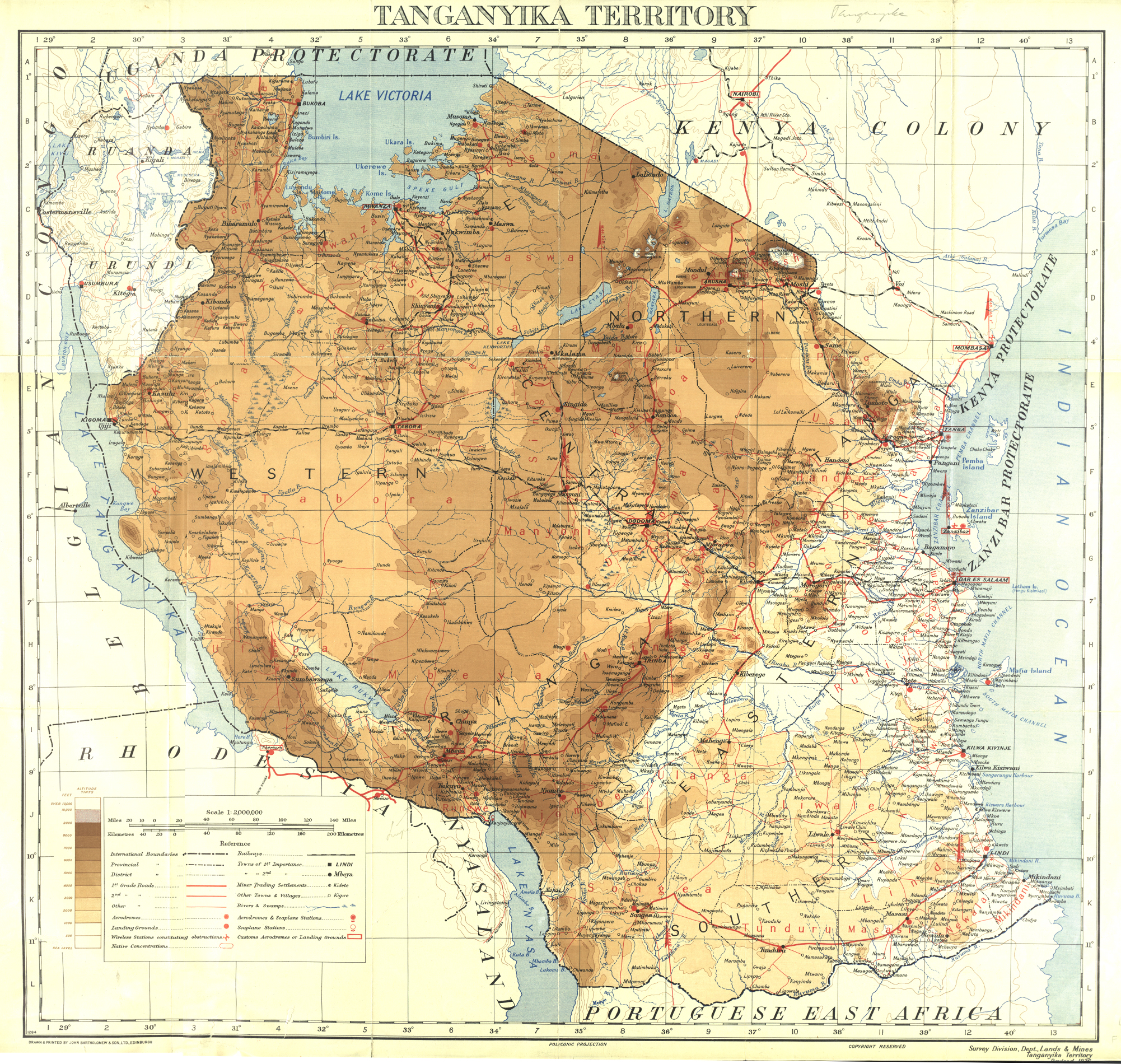
Map of Tanganyika Territory, 1936

The Tanganyika groundnut scheme, or East Africa groundnut scheme, was a failed attempt by the British government to cultivate tracts of its African trust territory Tanganyika (now part of Tanzania) with peanuts.

Launched in the aftermath of World War II in 1946 by the Labour Party administration of prime minister Clement Attlee, the goal was to produce urgently needed oilseeds on a projected 3 million acres (5,000 sq miles, or over 12,000 km^{2}, an area almost as big as Yorkshire), in order to increase margarine supplies in Britain and increase the profits from the British Empire.

The scheme's proponents, including Minister of Food John Strachey, had overlooked warnings that the environment and rainfall were unsuitable, communications were inadequate, and the project was being pursued with excessive haste. The disastrous project management, initially by the United Africa Company, and subsequently by the government-run Overseas Food Corporation, led the scheme to be popularly seen as a symbol of government incompetence and failure in late colonial Africa.

Despite the enormous effort and spending £36 million (equivalent to over £1 billion in 2020), the project failed abjectly and was finally abandoned in 1951. It was described in 1953 as "the worst fiasco in recent British colonial history."

== Background ==
In the period after the Second World War, Britain was in significant debt to the United States, facing what John Maynard Keynes termed a "financial Dunkirk", and the Attlee government sought the development of imperial territories to minimise their financial reliance upon the United States. Increasing the cultivation of food supplies in colonial territories, both for local consumption and export, was a central component of this strategy. The government subscribed to a Fabian view of colonial intervention which encouraged a proactive state role in producing primary materials and extending social benefits to colonial populations. The Tanganyika initiative represents part of a "second colonial occupation" within the British Empire, characterised by economic control and technological expertise.

In 1946, Frank Samuel, head of the United Africa Company, came up with an idea to cultivate groundnuts in Tanganyika, a British colonial territory under UN trusteeship, for the production of vegetable oil. Britain remained under World War II rationing and was short of cooking oils and fats, and especially margarine. He presented the idea to John Strachey, the Minister of Food, and in April 1946, the British government authorised a mission to visit suitable sites, led by John Wakefield, former Director of Agriculture in Tanganyika.

After a three-month mission, the team's report in September 1946 was optimistically favourable to the scheme and recommended the cultivation of 3.21 million acres for groundnuts by 1952. The Cabinet approved the recommendations in January 1947, and began transporting personnel and machinery to Tanganyika. Officials began to recruit men for the "Groundnut Army" and 100,000 former soldiers volunteered for the 1,200 jobs.

== Cultivation ==
The advance party set up camp at Kongwa, not far from Dodoma (now the capital of Tanzania), and scouted out the area. They deemed it suitable for groundnuts despite the large amount of clay and the local shortage of water, and established the scheme's headquarters there. Gradually a whole town was established, known locally as 'Half London', as half the population of London seemed to wash up there over time.

Obtaining the heavy equipment necessary to clear the land for cultivation, however, proved difficult. Eventually, the project managers found some suitable tractors and bulldozers from Canada and bought up U.S. Army surplus tractors from the Philippines, though many proved to be too rusted to use. These then had to be transported through the Port of Dar es Salaam, which became hopelessly congested, to the inland site using the only available transport, a single-track railway with steam locomotives. A sudden flood of the Kinyansungwe River wiped out part of the rail tracks, leaving a dirt road as the only means of transport. This delayed the arrival of the bulldozers needed for clearing until April 1947.

Even then, the bush proved far harder to clear than the planners had expected. Besides the natural hazards of local wildlife (on several occasions workers had to face angry elephants and rhinoceros), they found the large local baobab trees were hard to remove, a task made more difficult by one of them being a local tribal jail, another a site of ancestor worship, and many had bees' nests in their hollow trunks. Several workers were hospitalised with vicious bee stings.

But the main casualties were the heavy machines. By the end of the summer of 1947, two-thirds of the imported tractors had been rendered unusable. Bulldozer blades that were used to extract ground roots were ruined in a couple of days. In the spirit of 'making do', the scheme bought up surplus Sherman tanks and got the Vickers engineering company to take the armour off and put a bulldozer blade on the front, creating what were known as "shervicks"—but these too proved no match for the African bush. Eventually, in the wooded Southern Province, they discovered that a long chain linked between two bulldozers would flatten all the trees in between, while a third bulldozer was used to overturn any trees that resisted the chain. The first order for a suitable ship's anchor chain from London was, however, cancelled by the managers in London because they thought it was a joke.

In September 1947, the African workers joined a nationwide strike for three days; the expatriate staff were less than delighted to have to do their own cooking. A growing number of Africans were then employed as tractor drivers and, after early errors, became skilled at the job.

With great difficulty, the Groundnut Army was finally able to plant the first nuts. When the rainy season arrived, some of the workshops and stores were swept away by a flash flood. After that, the hot season baked the ground clay into a hard surface that made harvesting the nuts very difficult.

== Takeover and railway construction ==
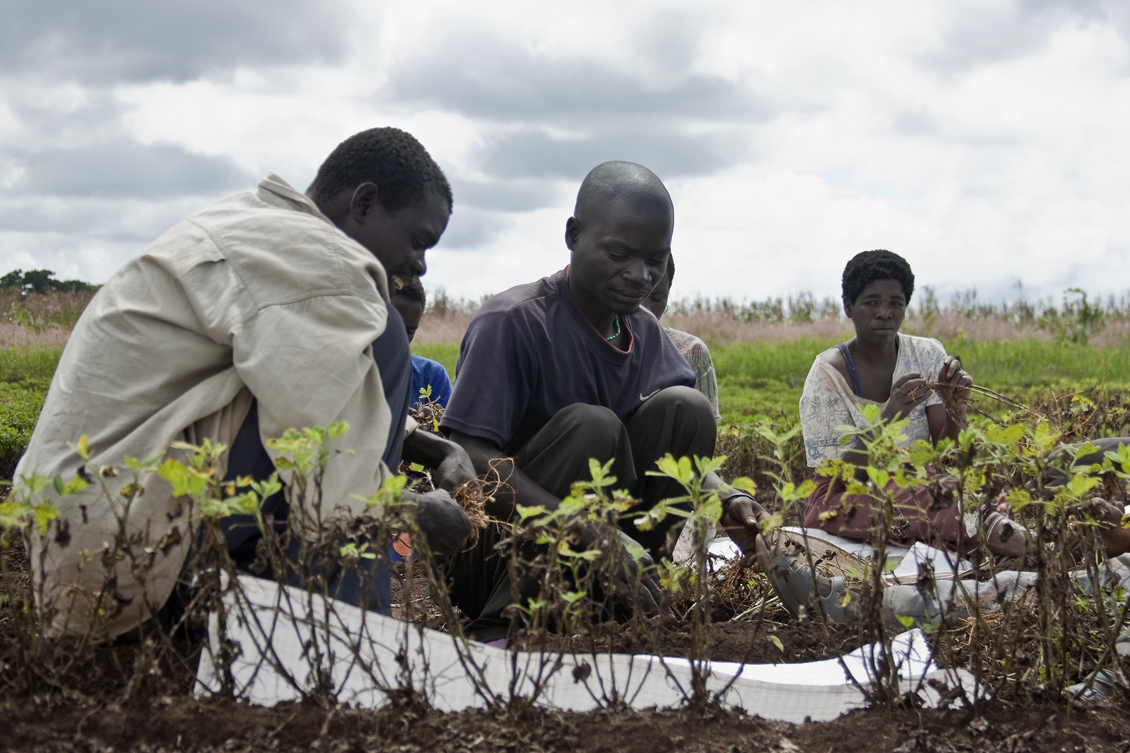
Groundnut cultivation in Malawi

In February 1948, the United Africa Company handed over responsibility for the project to the newly formed Overseas Food Corporation (OFC). It sent a new manager, Major-General Desmond Harrison, to the site. He found the scheme in a state of chaos, and immediately tried to instil some military discipline, which did not endear him to the workers, but subsequently retreated to his tent to concentrate on copious paperwork in a vain effort to contain the spiralling costs. Late in the year he was ordered back home on sick leave.

In 1949, the Kongwa region was struck by a terrible drought, which decimated the crop. After two years, only 2,000 tons of groundnuts were harvested, less than had been imported as seed, and an attempt to grow sunflowers instead proved futile as they were even more susceptible to drought.

The scheme's managers therefore began to focus attention on the more fertile regions in the west and south of Tanganyika, but the development of both was proving painfully slow. In the south, not only was a whole new railway line needed, but a deep-water port had to be constructed from scratch at Mtwara. The Southern Province Railway was constructed first in order to transport the crops, but never had any to transport and was later dismantled.

The original target of 3 million acres was reduced to 150,000 acres (607 km^{2}) and then to 50,000 acres (202 km^{2}). In the end only 47,000 were ever cleared.

By late 1949, the scheme was coming in for robust criticism in Parliament and the press. The author Alan Wood, who had headed the Information Unit of the Overseas Food Corporation, resigned to publish a book about the failures of the scheme, The Groundnut Affair (1950). In March 1950, in the House of Commons John Boyd-Carpenter asked the Minister of Food, Maurice Webb, to make a statement about attempts by Leslie Plummer MP, head of the Overseas Food Corporation, to stop the publication of the book. The government persevered, but suffered for it at the election in February 1950 and even more when it lost the 1951 United Kingdom general election. Just before that, in January 1951, it had finally cancelled the project, the Treasury writing off a total of £36.5 million — equivalent in 2020 to over £1 billion. Mechanised production was stopped, and the cleared land handed over to African farmers, who did a better job growing tobacco and cashew nuts and herding cattle.

== Cultural references ==
The 1950 British comedy film, The Happiest Days of Your Life, concludes with Alastair Sim and Margaret Rutherford quietly discussing in which remote and unattractive corner of the British Empire they might best try to pick up the pieces of their respective careers, and with her mentioning having a brother who "grows groundnuts in Tanganyika."

== See also ==
- Bãi Bằng
- Jari project
- Jatropha curcas
- Railway stations in Tanzania
