= Korogwe =

- Town
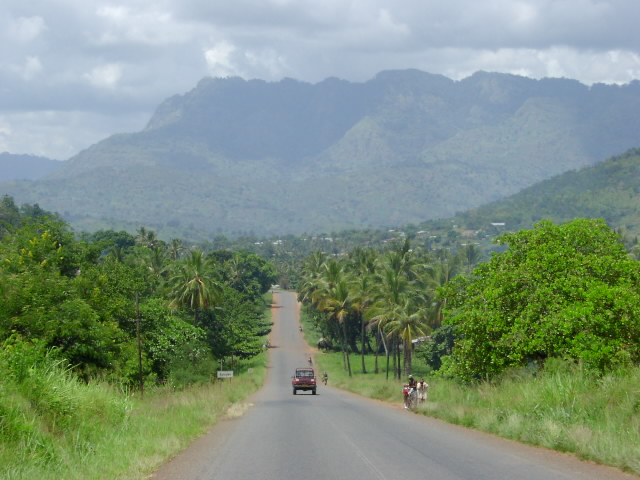
- The road to Korogwe with the Usambara mountains in the background
- Nickname: Koogwe
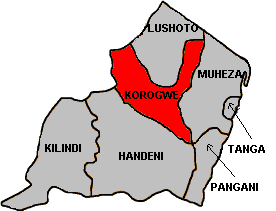
- Korogwe District in Tanga Region

- Location of Korogwe.
- Coordinates: 05°09′21″S 38°27′01″E
- Country: Tanzania
- Region: Tanga Region
- District: Korogwe District

Government
  - Type: Town Council

Population (2022 census)
  - Total: 62,032

Ethnicity
- Time zone: UTC+3 (EAT)
  - Summer (DST): UTC+3 (not observed)
- Area code: 027
- Website: www.tanga.go.tz

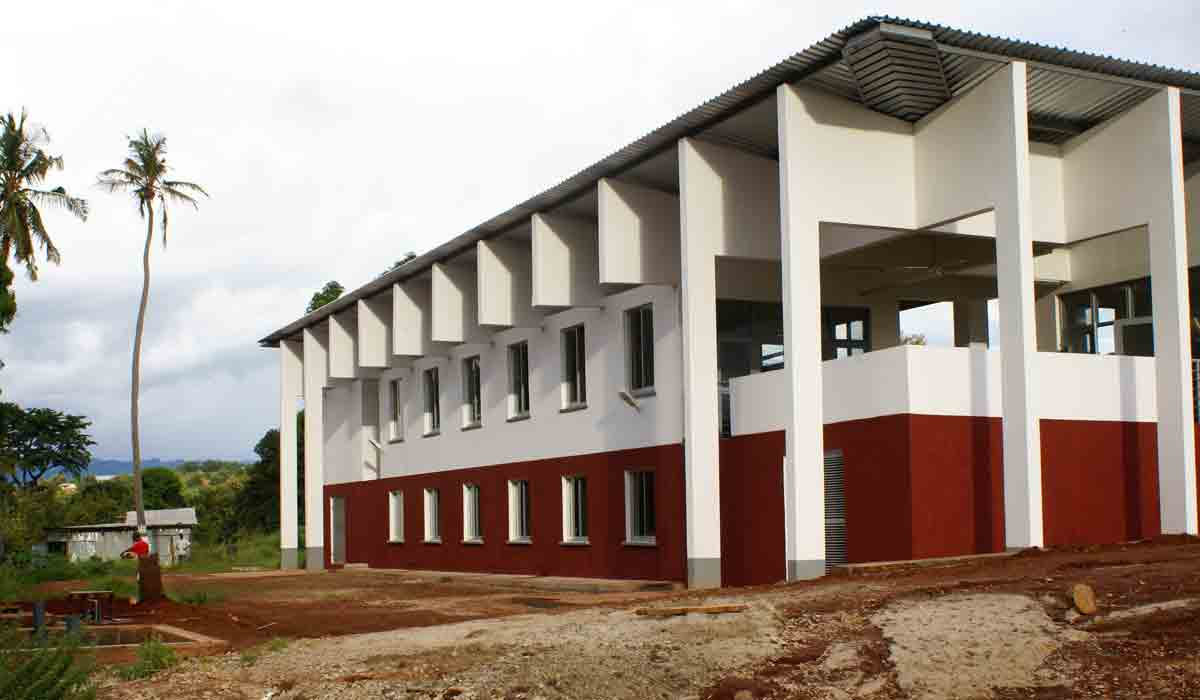
The Magunga Hospital Laboratory designed by Jakob Knudsen.

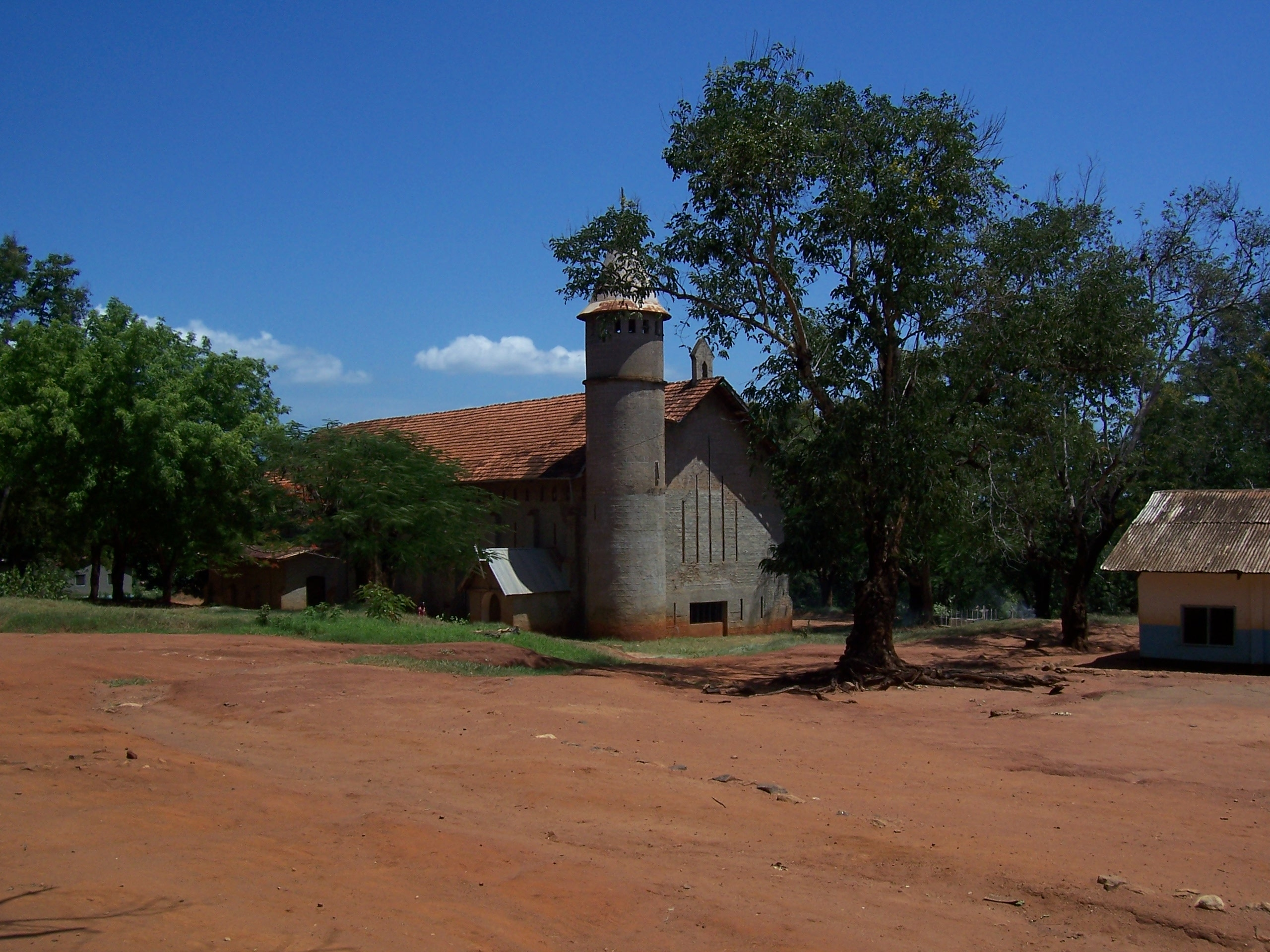
St. Michael's Cathedral

Korogwe is a town in Tanzania, with a population of 62,032 in 2022. It is the main centre of Korogwe District, which is within the Tanga Region.

== Overview ==
The town is the seat of the Anglican Diocese of Tanga and has a cathedral church dedicated to St. Michael and All Angels. It also has a teacher training college and a number of secondary schools.

The district is drained by tributaries of the Pangani River.

== Health care ==
The Magunga district hospital is the home of the NIMR Korogwe Research Laboratory. The building was designed by the Danish architect Jakob Knudsen (see also picture below). Great effort was taken to adapt the building to local environment and climate. The building was officially opened on 19 September 2008 and has since been used to support malaria vaccine trials.

== Transport ==
=== Road ===
Korogwe is a road and rail junction, where the routes from Tanga link those from Dar es Salaam to the northern cities of Arusha and Moshi.
