= South African type X-17 water tender =

Steam locomotive introduced in 1938

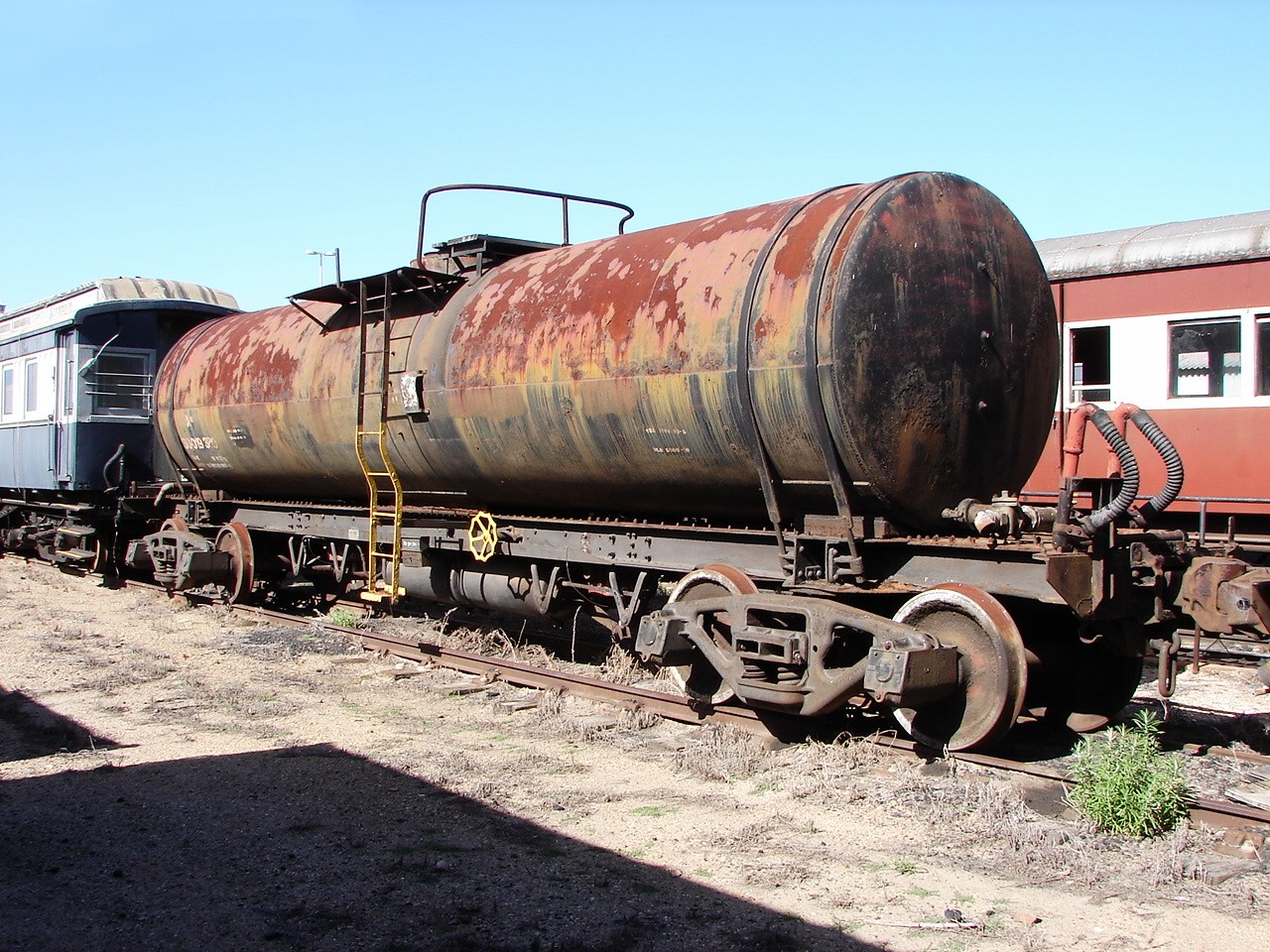
- Type X-17 water tender (1953 model), 2009
Type and origin
- ♠ 1938 version - ♥ 1953 version
- Locomotive: Class GM
- Designer: South African Railways (W.A.J. Day)
- Builder: South African Railways
- In service: 1938, 1953
Specifications
- Configuration: 2-axle bogies
- Gauge: 3 ft 6 in (1,067 mm) Cape gauge
- Length: 43 ft 10 3/4 in (13,379 mm)
- Width: 8 ft 3 in (2,515 mm)
- Height: 11 ft 7 1/4 in (3,537 mm)
- Bogies: ♠ Diamond-frame ♥ SARCAST
- Wheel dia.: 34 in (864 mm)
- Wheelbase: 35 ft 9 in (10,897 mm)
  - Bogie: 5 ft 9 in (1,753 mm)
- Axle load: 12 LT 8 cwt 3 qtr (12,640 kg)
  - Bogie: 24 LT 17 cwt 3 qtr (25,290 kg)
- Weight empty: 43,211 lb (19,600 kg)
- Weight w/o: 49 LT 15 cwt 3 qtr (50,590 kg)
- Water cap.: ♠ 6,750 imp gal (30,700 L) ♥ 6,815 imp gal (31,000 L)
- Couplers: AAR knuckle (SASKOP S)
Career
- Operators: South African Railways
- Numbers: ♠ 2291-2306 ♥ 2572-2596, 4051-4075

The South African type X-17 water tender was a Garratt steam locomotive tender.

Type X-17 water tenders first entered service in 1938, as auxiliary water tenders to the Class GM 4-8-2+2-8-4 Double Mountain type Garratt steam locomotives which entered service on the South African Railways in that year.

== Manufacturers ==
The first Type X-17 water tenders were built by the South African Railways (SAR) in its Pietermaritzburg shops in 1938. A redesigned second version was built in 1953.

During 1938 and 1939, the SAR placed sixteen Class GM Garratt articulated steam locomotives with a 4-8-2+2-8-4 Double Mountain type wheel arrangement in goods train service on the Mafeking line out of Johannesburg. The locomotives were built by Beyer, Peacock & Company. The initial designs of the Class GM Garratt by W.A.J. Day, Chief Mechanical Engineer of the SAR from 1936 to 1939, were rejected by the Chief Civil Engineer, since the weight on the leading and trailing bogies of each engine unit would exceed the acceptable limit for the 60 pounds per yard (29.8 kilograms per metre) rail of the Mafeking line. To overcome the axle load objections, the water capacity of the front water tank was reduced to 1,600 imperial gallons (7,270 litres; 1,920 US gallons) while the rear bunker was redesigned to carry no water and with a coal capacity of 10 long tons (10.2 tonnes; 11.2 short tons). The meagre water supply, which would really only be sufficient for shunting purposes, would be augmented by semi-permanently coupling a purpose-built auxiliary water tender to the locomotive.

The Type X-17 water tender first entered service as tenders to these locomotives. In effect, since Garratt locomotives had hitherto been considered as tank engines because they carry all their water on board, this arrangement introduced the tank-and-tender Garratt. In spite of initial criticisms and doubts, the unusual arrangement of auxiliary water tenders which had earlier only been seen on the Kitson-Meyer locomotives of the Cape Government Railways and Central South African Railways of 1903 and 1904 respectively, proved to be very effective and was later repeated upon the introduction of the Classes GMA and GO Garratts in 1954. On the Class GM, the 1,600 imperial gallons (7,270 litres) on-board water tank on the front engine unit was only used when the water tender was temporarily disconnected from the engine at running sheds.

== Characteristics ==
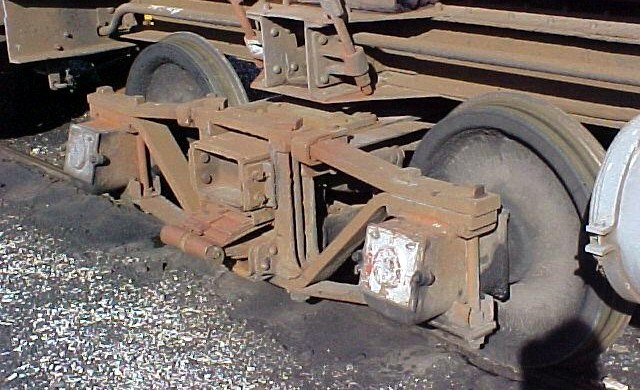
Diamond frame bogie

Photographs from the 1940s show the original water tenders with a traditional high turret. The water tenders of 1938 had a water capacity of 6,750 imperial gallons (30,700 litres; 8,110 US gallons) and rode on diamond-frame bogies (similar to North American Archbar trucks) with elliptical springs.

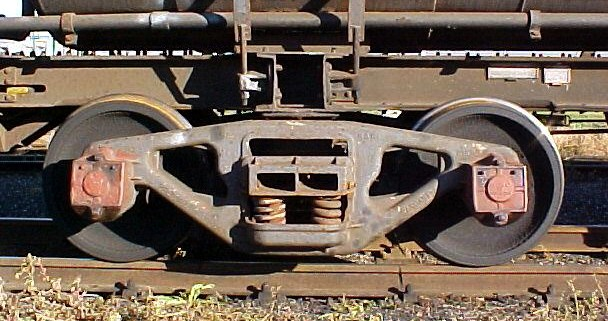
SARCAST bogie

A second version of the Type X-17 water tender was built in 1953, for use with the first 25 Class GMA and the 25 Class GO Garratt locomotives which were to enter service the following year. These water tenders had a low flat-topped turret with a hinged hatch and a curved handrail across the tank barrel, similar to that of the Type MX tender. They had a capacity of 30,980 litres (8,184 US gallons; 6,815 imperial gallons), with a tank barrel of 1,975 millimetres (6 feet 5 3/4 inches) diameter inside and 10,312 millimetres (33 feet 10 inches) long. It rode on SARCAST bogies (similar to North American Bettendorf trucks) with coil springs.

The vehicles were 13,380 millimetres (43 feet 10 3/4 inches) long over the coupler faces and 12,496 millimetres (41 feet) across the buffer beams.

== Locomotives ==
Three Garratt locomotive classes were designed as tank-and-tender Garratts and rarely worked without auxiliary water tenders. The Type X-17 water tenders were originally numbered for these engines in the number ranges as shown.

- 1938: Class GM, numbers 2291 to 2306.
- 1954: Class GMA, first batch, numbers 4051 to 4075.
- 1954: Class GO, numbers 2572 to 2596.

When the SAR adopted a computerised goods wagon numbering system, the surviving Type X-17 water tenders were allocated numbers in the range from 30 019 052 to 30 019 125 (short numbers 1905 to 1912) in respect of the 1938 models and in the number range from 30 019 214 to 30 019 672 (short numbers 1921 to 1967) in respect of the 1953 models. Water tenders bearing "X-17" markings have, however, been photographed bearing numbers in the 30 025 xxx number range of the Type X-20 water tenders.

== Preservation ==
After the end of steam operations in the late 1980s, most of the watering facilities which once existed country-wide have either fallen into disuse or been removed. The Pretoria-based steam heritage club Friends of the Rail and the Germiston-based Reefsteamers therefore often operate their preserved Class 15F steam locomotives with preserved auxiliary water tenders to extend their water range.

== Illustration ==
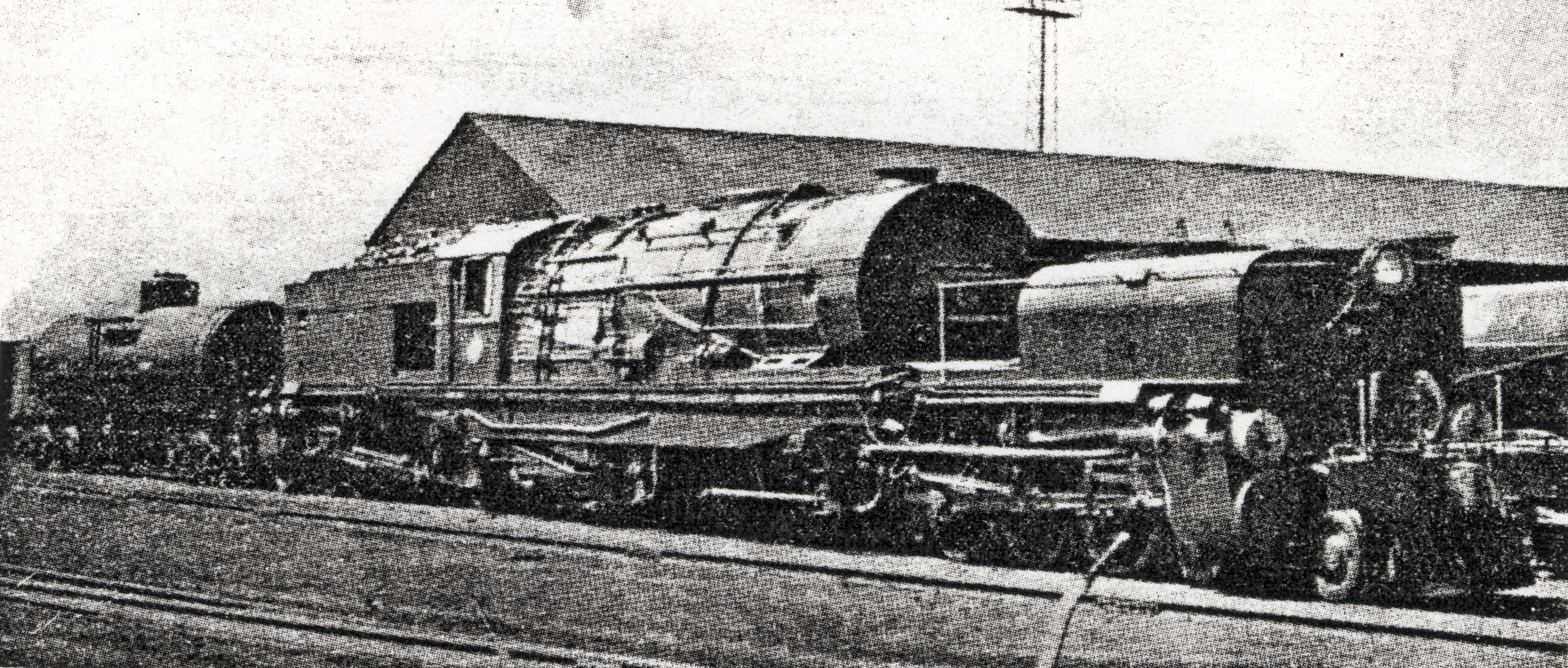
High turret Type X-17 auxiliary water tender on Class GM, c. 1940

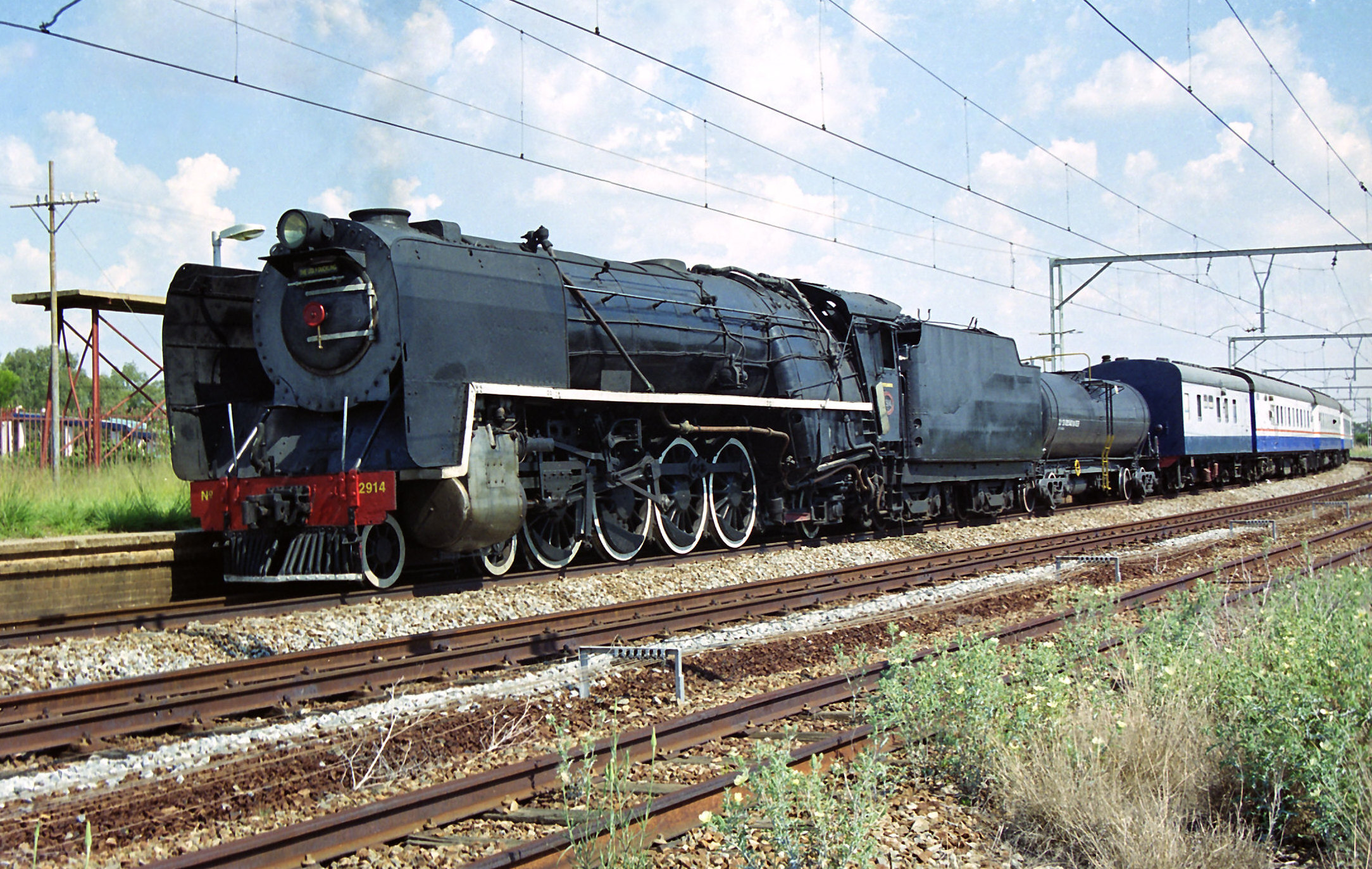
Low turret Auxiliary water tender on Class 15F, 2000
