= South African Class GMA 4-8-2+2-8-4 =

1954 articulated steam locomotive

South African Class GMA & GMAM 4-8-2+2-8-4
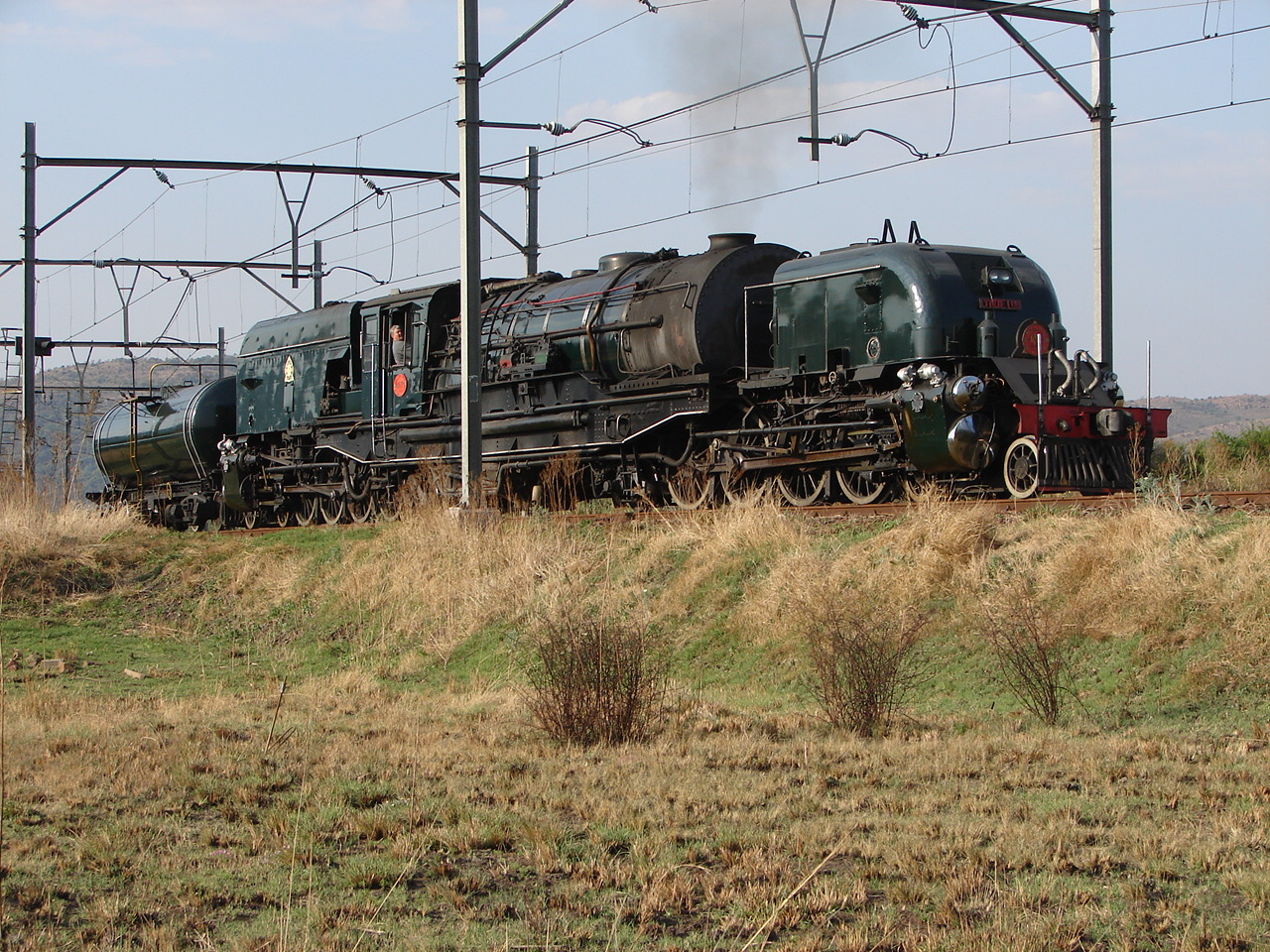
- Class GMAM no. 4079 Lindie Lou, Capital Park, 30 September 2006
Type and origin
- ♠ Configured as Class GMA ♥ Configured as Class GMAM
- Power type: Steam
- Designer: South African Railways (L.C. Grubb)
- Builder: Henschel and Son; Beyer, Peacock and Company; North British Locomotive Company
- Serial number: Henschel 28680-28704, 29600-29629; BP 7550-7552, 7677-7681, 7750-7776, 7826-7855; NBL 27691-27702, 27769-27778, 27783-27792
- Model: Class GMA
- Build date: 1953–1958
- Total produced: 120
Specifications
- Configuration
  - Whyte: 4-8-2+2-8-4 (Double Mountain)
  - UIC: 2'D1'+1'D2'h4t
- Driver: 3rd & 6th coupled axles
- Gauge: 3 ft 6 in (1,067 mm) Cape gauge
- Leading dia.: 30 in (762 mm)
- Coupled dia.: 54 in (1,372 mm)
- Trailing dia.: 30 in (762 mm)
- Tender wheels: 34 in (864 mm)
- Minimum curve: 275 ft (84 m)
- Wheelbase: 86 ft 4 in (26,314 mm)
  - Axle spacing (Asymmetrical): 1-2: 4 ft 10 in (1,473 mm) each 2-3: 4 ft 9 in (1,448 mm) each 3-4: 4 ft 10 in (1,473 mm) each
  - Engine: 30 ft 4 in (9,246 mm) each
  - Leading: 6 ft 10 in (2,083 mm) each
  - Coupled: 14 ft 5 in (4,394 mm) each
  - Tender: 35 ft 9 in (10,897 mm)
  - Tender bogie: 5 ft 9 in (1,753 mm)
- Pivot centres: 45 ft (13,716 mm)
- Length
  - Over couplers: 93 ft 10 in (28,600 mm) engine 43 ft 10 4/5 in (13,381 mm) tender 137 ft 8 4/5 in (41,981 mm) total
- Height: 13 ft (3,962 mm)
- Frame type: Cast
- Axle load: ♠ 15 LT 7 cwt (15,600 kg) ♥ 15 LT 14 cwt (15,950 kg)
  - Leading: ♠ 20 LT 16 cwt (21,130 kg) front 20 LT 16 cwt (21,130 kg) rear ♥ 21 LT 16 cwt (22,150 kg) front 21 LT 9 cwt (21,790 kg) rear
  - 1st coupled: ♠ 14 LT 14 cwt (14,940 kg) ♥ 14 LT 18 cwt (15,140 kg)
  - 2nd coupled: ♠ 15 LT 5 cwt (15,490 kg) ♥ 15 LT 8 cwt (15,650 kg)
  - 3rd coupled: ♠ 15 LT 2 cwt (15,340 kg) ♥ 15 LT 6 cwt (15,550 kg)
  - 4th coupled: ♠ 14 LT 13 cwt (14,890 kg) ♥ 14 LT 17 cwt (15,090 kg)
  - 5th coupled: ♠ 14 LT 16 cwt (15,040 kg) ♥ 15 LT 4 cwt (15,440 kg)
  - 6th coupled: ♠ 15 LT 5 cwt (15,490 kg) ♥ 15 LT 12 cwt (15,850 kg)
  - 7th coupled: ♠ 15 LT 7 cwt (15,600 kg) ♥ 15 LT 14 cwt (15,950 kg)
  - 8th coupled: ♠ 14 LT 17 cwt (15,090 kg) ♥ 15 LT 4 cwt (15,440 kg)
  - Trailing: ♠ 12 LT 14 cwt (12,900 kg) front 12 LT 17 cwt (13,060 kg) rear ♥ 12 LT 17 cwt (13,060 kg) front 13 LT 3 cwt (13,360 kg) rear
  - Tender bogie: 25 LT 4 cwt 2 qtr (25,630 kg)
  - Tender axle: 12 LT 12 cwt 1 qtr (12,810 kg)
- Adhesive weight: ♠ 119 LT 19 cwt (121,900 kg) ♥ 122 LT 3 cwt (124,100 kg)
- Loco weight: ♠ 187 LT 1 cwt (190,100 kg) ♥ 191 LT 8 cwt (194,500 kg)
- Tender weight: 50 LT 9 cwt 1 qtr (51,270 kg)
- Total weight: ♠ 237 LT 10 cwt 1 qtr (241,300 kg) ♥ 241 LT 17 cwt 1 qtr (245,700 kg)
- Tender type: X-17 (2-axle bogies); X-20 (2-axle bogies); X-17, X-20 permitted
- Fuel type: Coal
- Fuel capacity: ♠ 11 LT 12 cwt (11.8 t) ♥ 14 LT (14.2 t)
- Water cap.: ♠ 1,650 imp gal (7,500 L) ♥ 2,100 imp gal (9,500 L)
- Tender cap.: 6,790 imp gal (30,900 L)
- Firebox
  - Type: Round-top
  - Grate area: 63.2 sq ft (5.87 m^{2})
- Boiler
  - Pitch: 8 ft 6 in (2,591 mm)
  - Diameter: 6 ft 11 1/2 in (2,121 mm)
  - Tube plates: 13 ft 6 1/2 in (4,128 mm)
  - Small tubes: 282: 2 in (51 mm)
  - Large tubes: 50: 5 1/2 in (140 mm)
- Boiler pressure: 200 psi (1,379 kPa)
- Safety valve: Ross-pop
- Heating surface
  - Firebox: 212 sq ft (19.7 m^{2})
  - Tubes: 2,974 sq ft (276.3 m^{2})
  - Arch tubes: 25.2 sq ft (2.34 m^{2})
  - Total surface: 3,211.2 sq ft (298.33 m^{2})
- Superheater
  - Heating area: 747 sq ft (69.4 m^{2})
- Cylinders: Four
- Cylinder size: 20 1/2 in (521 mm) bore 26 in (660 mm) stroke
- Valve gear: Walschaerts
- Valve type: Piston
- Loco brake: Vacuum brake
- Train brakes: Vacuum brake
- Couplers: AAR knuckle
Performance figures
- Tractive effort: 60,700 lbf (270 kN) @ 75%
Career
- Operators: South African Railways
- Class: Class GMA & GMAM
- Number in class: 120
- Numbers: 4051–4170
- Delivered: 1954–1958
- First run: 1954
- Withdrawn: 1988
- Disposition: 11 preserved, remainder scrapped

The South African Railways Class GMA 4-8-2+2-8-4 of 1954 is an articulated steam locomotive.

Between 1954 and 1958, the South African Railways placed 120 Class GMA Garratt articulated steam locomotives with a 4-8-2+2-8-4 Double Mountain type wheel arrangement in service. All the locomotives could be configured as either a Class GMA branch line or a Class GMAM mainline engine. This was the most numerous Garratt class in the world.

== Manufacturers ==
The light rail branch line Class GMA and mainline Class GMAM Garratt locomotive, a single Class which could be configured for either branch line or mainline working, was a development of the large Class GM branch line locomotive which was introduced on the South African Railways (SAR) in 1938. Like the Class GM, the Class GMA was a tank-and-tender Garratt which ran with a semi-permanently coupled auxiliary water tender to augment its meagre water capacity.

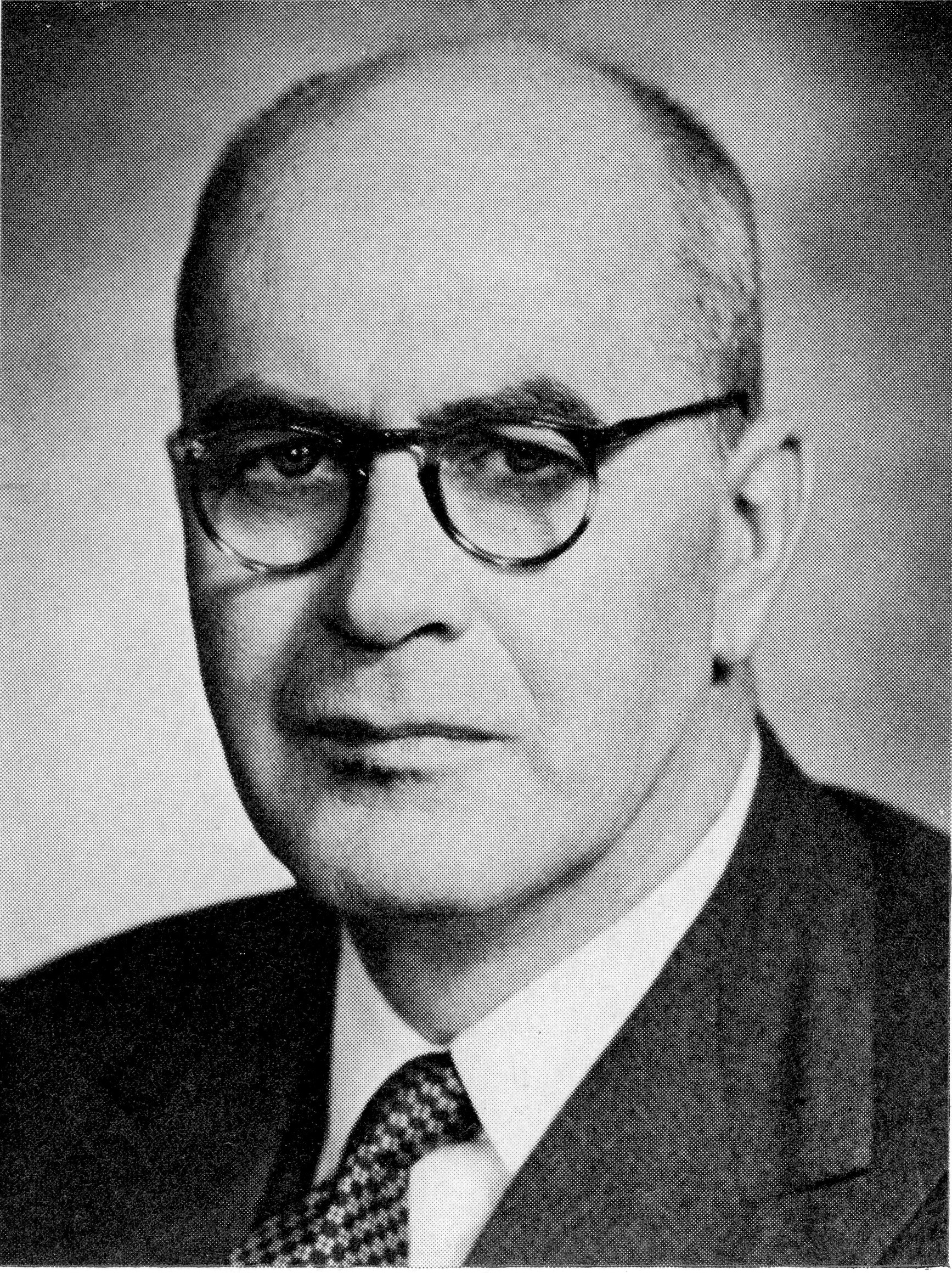
L.C. Grubb

The locomotive was designed in 1952 under the supervision of L.C. Grubb, Chief Mechanical Engineer (CME) of the SAR from 1949 to 1954. An order for the first 25 of these locomotives was placed with Henschel and Son in Germany. They were built in 1953 and were delivered and placed in service in 1954, numbered in the range from 4051 to 4075. These first 25 locomotives were equipped with Type X-17 water tenders, built by the SAR in its Pietermaritzburg shops in 1953.

A second batch of 35 locomotives was delivered by Beyer, Peacock and Company (BP) in 1956. Of these, 23 were built by BP and numbered in the range from 4076 to 4098, while the other twelve, numbered in the range from 4099 to 4110, had been subcontracted by BP to the North British Locomotive Company (NBL). These twelve engines therefore bore works plates showing BP as well as NBL as builders.

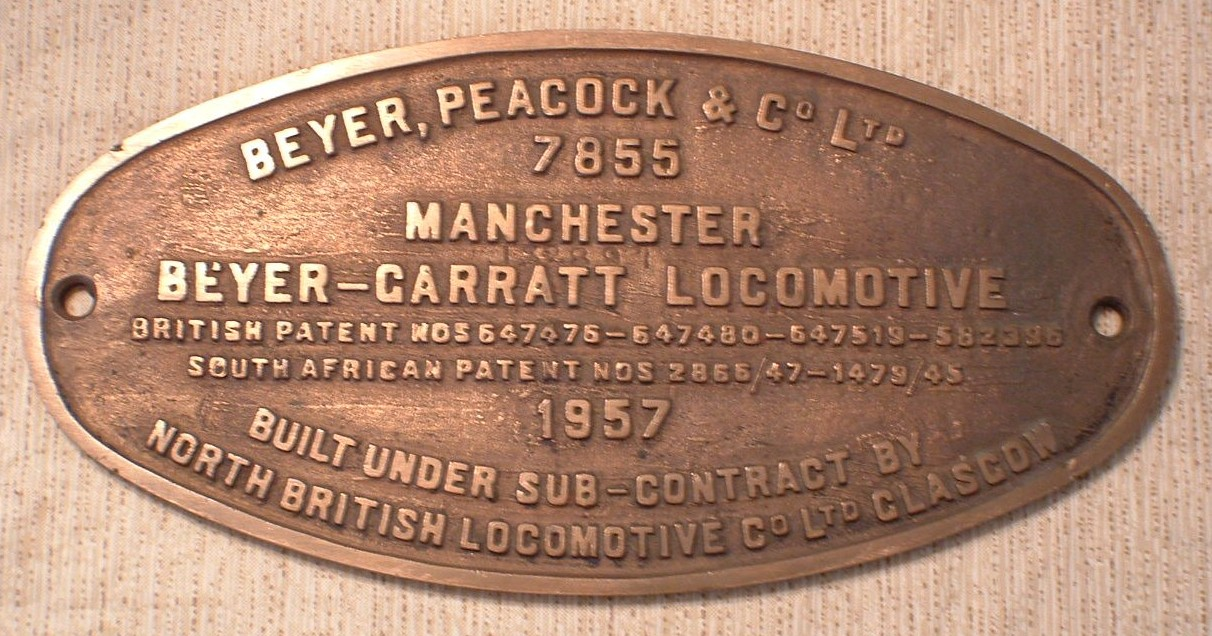
BP & NBL works plate off no. 4140

This was followed by a third and final batch of sixty locomotives in 1958. Of these, thirty were delivered by BP, of which only ten, numbered in the range from 4121 to 4130, had actually been built by BP. The other twenty, numbered in the ranges from 4111 to 4120 and 4131 to 4140, had once again been subcontracted by BP to NBL. These twenty therefore also bore works plates showing BP as well as NBL as builders. Number 4140 turned out to be the last steam locomotive built by North British. The other thirty locomotives of the third batch, numbered in the range from 4141 to 4170, were again built by Henschel in Germany.

The locomotives of the second and third batches were equipped with Type X-20 water tenders, built in the Pietermaritzburg shops between 1956 and 1958.

== Characteristics ==
The light rail branch line Class GMA and the mainline Class GMAM were the same locomotive of which the water and coal capacities could be adjusted to suit by installing or removing plates in the coal and water spaces. As a result, it is virtually impossible to list the GMA and GMAM versions separately since they could easily be converted back and forth between the two versions and often were. Up until about 1962, for example, the division was 20 Class GMA and 100 Class GMAM, but by 1969 there were 69 Class GMA and 39 Class GMAM, two locomotives having by then been scrapped after accident damage. By 1975, on the other hand, there were only 25 Class GMA against 93 Class GMAM.

The locomotive was thoroughly modern in design, with a one-piece cast steel frame with Franklin spring-loaded wedge horns, manufactured by Commonwealth Steel Castings Corporation in the United States of America. Like the Class 25 locomotive, it had roller bearing axle boxes on all wheels, but not on the crank-pins, with cannon boxes on all axles, except those of the inner Bissel trucks which had outside bearings. It had mechanical lubrication throughout, self-adjusting pivots, a U-shaped foundation ring welded to the inner and outer firebox bottom edges, and an all-welded firebox. The engine units also had Commonwealth cast steel type frames.

The boiler's inside diameter was 6 feet 11 1/2 inches (2,121 millimetres) at the first ring and 7 feet 1 1/4 inches (2,165 millimetres) at the firebox end. The boiler had an inspection manhole, fitted to the top of the boiler aft of the dome. The locomotive was superheated, with a mechanical stoker and Walschaerts valve gear. It could negotiate curves of 275 feet (84 metres) radius with a gauge widening of not more than 3/4 inch (19 millimetres) and a superelevation of 4 1/2 inches (114 millimetres).

Some of these locomotives, intended for working in areas where there were tunnels such as on the East London mainline, were initially equipped with steam-operated smoke deflecting cowls over their chimneys. When the smoke cowls were later removed, these specific locomotives could still be identified by their almost non-existent chimneys which had to be shorter in order to enable the cowls to fit within the loading gauge.

As was done with the predecessor Class GM, the new locomotive carried water only in its front tank, but with the capacity increased from the Class GM's 1,600 imperial gallons (7,270 litres) to either 1,650 imperial gallons (7,500 litres) for the Class GMA or 2,100 imperial gallons (9,550 litres) for the Class GMAM. Likewise, the rear bunker carried only coal, but with the capacity increased from the Class GM's 10 long tons (10,160 kilograms) to either 11 long tons 12 hundredweight (11,790 kilograms) for the Class GMA or 14 long tons (14,220 kilograms) for the Class GMAM.

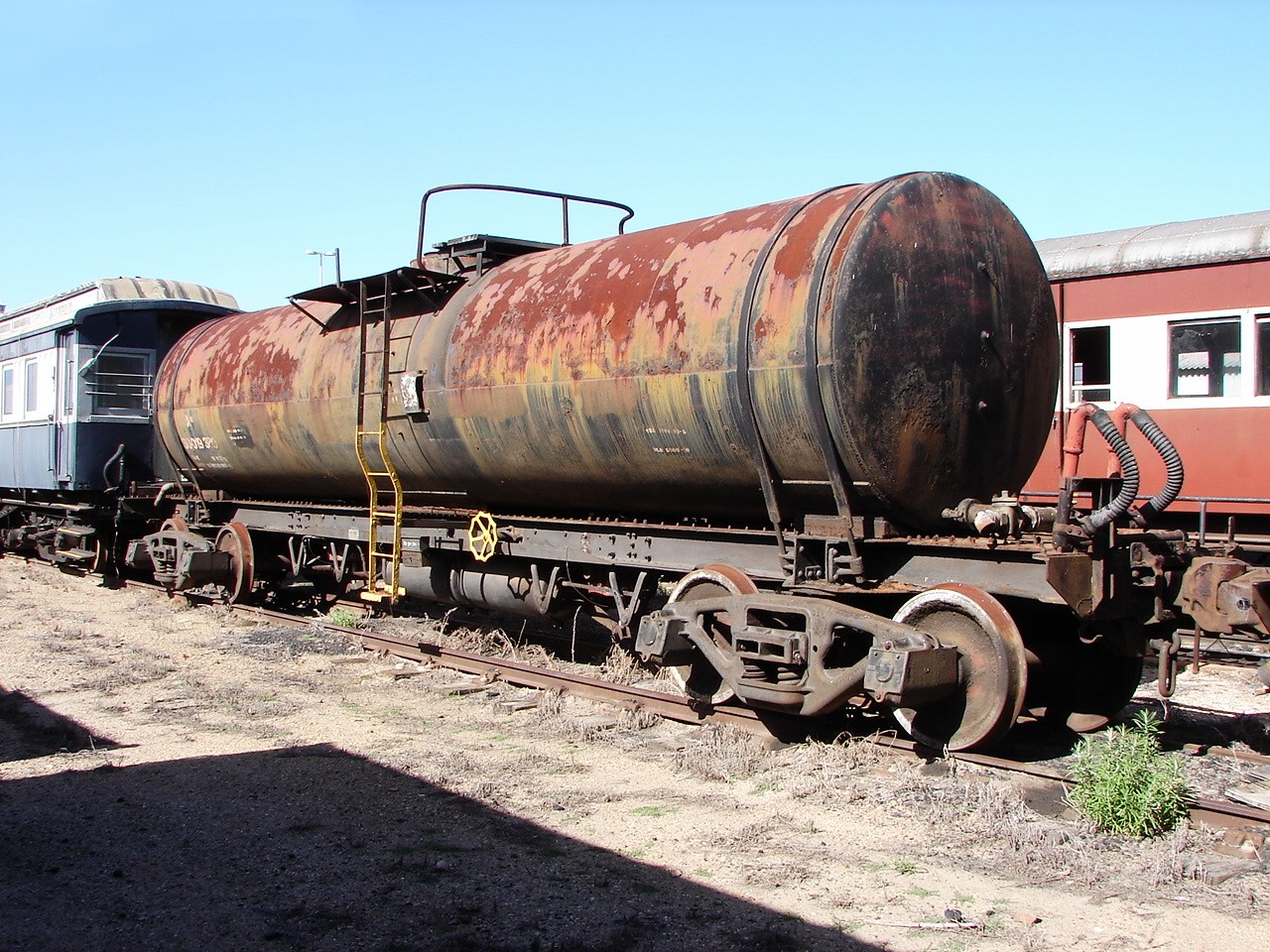
Type X-17 water tender

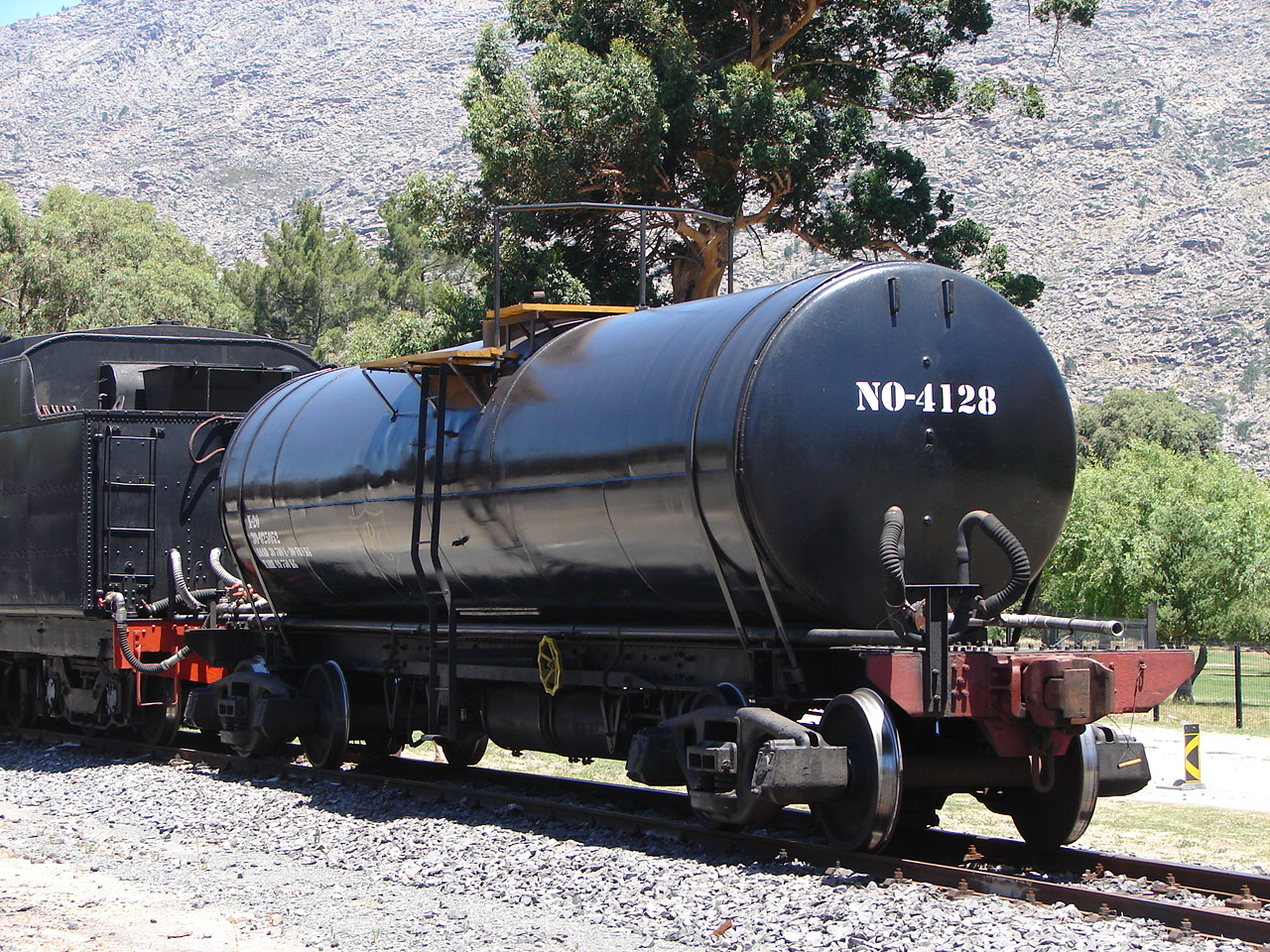
Type X-20 water tender no. 4128

As with the Class GM, the Class GMA's water supply was augmented by semi-permanently coupling a purpose-built auxiliary water tender. The first batch of 25 locomotives were tended by the same Type X-17 water tender which was used with the Class GM, with a capacity of between 6,750 and 6,815 imperial gallons (30,700 and 31,000 litres). The rest of the locomotives were tended by Type X-20 water tenders with a capacity of 6,790 imperial gallons (30,900 litres). The tenders were numbered for their engines and were painted black with red buffer beams.

The locomotive was designed to operate on 60 pounds per yard (30 kilograms per metre) rail despite the maximum axle loading of 15 long tons 14 hundredweight (15,950 kilograms) of the Class GMAM. This had been accomplished by restricting the weight on the leading and trailing bogies to 22 long tons (22,350 kilograms) and balancing the coupled wheels so that the hammer blow was equal for all wheels and did not exceed one ton on any wheel at 45 miles per hour (72 kilometres per hour).

Although the SAR specifications called for a 15 long tons 14 hundredweight (15,950 kilograms) maximum axle loading, the Class GMAM spent its entire career running on track that could take 18 long tons (18,290 kilograms) or more. Without the restriction of the coal bunker and onboard water tank capacity to 14 long tons (14,220 kilograms) and 2,100 imperial gallons (9,500 litres) respectively and the necessity to haul along a water tender, the class would have been much more useful and their service lives could possibly have been prolonged. Their shortcomings as traffic machines was possibly one of the root causes of the rapid mainline dieselisation of the SAR in the 1960s.

== Service ==
=== South African Railways ===
The 120 locomotives of this class made it the most numerous Garratt class in the world. The Class GMA and Class GMAM saw service on main- and secondary lines in many parts of South Africa. Prior to electrification, a number were employed in Transvaal on the Komatipoort line across the pass between Waterval Onder and Waterval Boven. Along with the Class GM, the Class GMA served on the line from Krugersdorp via Zeerust to Mafeking.

They also served temporarily on the coal line from Witbank to Germiston until the electrification between Witbank and Welgedag was completed. The second and third batches of locomotives were ordered from 1956 to assist with moving large volumes of traffic, mostly coal, from the Transvaal to destinations in the Free State and Cape Province. Until the Class DE-1, the SAR's first road diesels, took over this task late in 1958, they were employed on block coal workings from Witbank to Kroonstad, a distance of 208 miles (335 kilometres). Since the track en route was built for 21 long tons (21,340 kilograms) axle loads, such a large order for locomotives with a 15 long tons 14 hundredweight (15,950 kilograms) axle loading was unusual.

In Natal, the bulk of the Class was based at Pietermaritzburg, from where they worked most trains on the two heavily graded branch lines to Greytown and Franklin. Others worked on the Natal North Coast line between Stanger and Empangeni, while some joined the Class GL on the coal line between Vryheid and Glencoe.

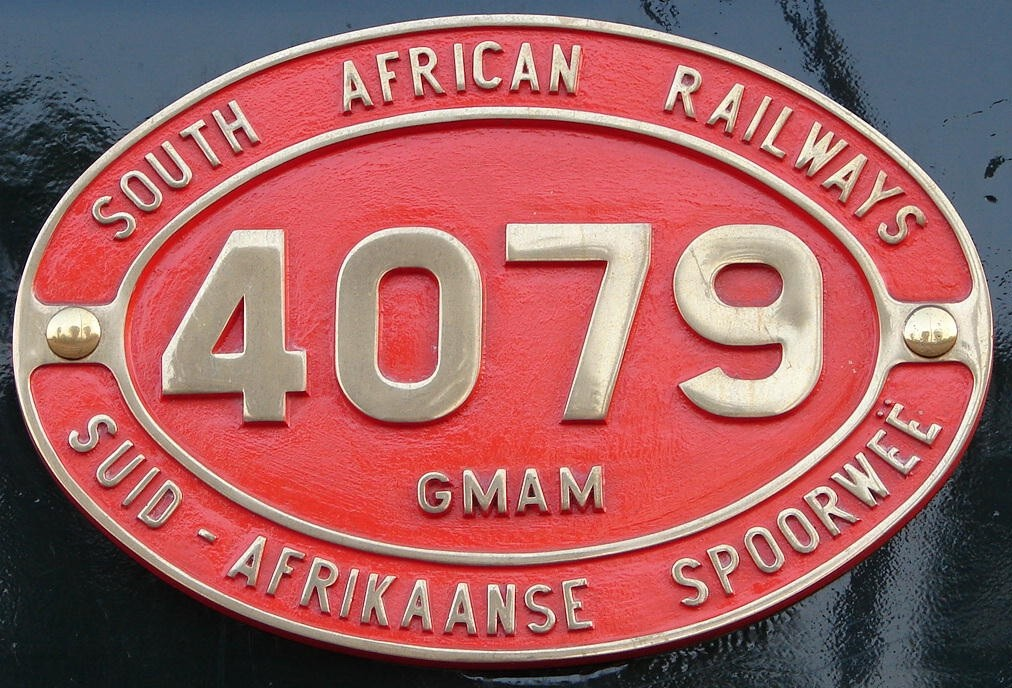

The Cape Western system's locomotives were stationed at Worcester, from where they worked the old New Cape Central Railway (NCCR) line via Riversdale to Mosselbaai until it was dieselised. Between 1981 and 1984, a number were allocated to the Cape Northern system to work the line from Vryburg to Mafeking, where they largely replaced the Class 19D locomotives which had earlier dominated on this line. This turned out to be their last term in mainline service since they were replaced by Class 25NC locomotives in 1984 when the line was relaid with heavier rail.

Most of the Class was then allocated to the Cape Midland System in 1984, with most of them initially stationed at Voorbaai where they replaced the Class GEA on trains from Mosselbaai to Riversdale and across the Montagu Pass to Oudtshoorn. Their allocation was later extended to the sheds at Sydenham in Port Elizabeth, Rosmead, Klipplaat and Graaff-Reinet, with the result that they worked most of the trains over the route from Port Elizabeth to Rosmead via Klipplaat and across the Lootsberg Pass from Graaff-Reinet.

Towards the end of their service lives, the Eastern Transvaal system still had an allocation of them, where locomotives from the Waterval Boven and Breyten sheds worked the line down to Vryheid in Natal.

They were the last class of Garratt to remain in service with the SAR. All but three were withdrawn from service by April 1988 and those three were also retired shortly afterwards.

4140 (BP 7855, NBL 27792) was the last of the class delivered and became the last steam locomotive built by the North British Locomotive Company.

=== Zimbabwe and Mozambique ===
During the period from August 1979 to September 1981, altogether 26 locomotives of the Class were hired to Zimbabwe-Rhodesia, but not all at the same time since they were rotated with Capital Park in Pretoria as their nominal home for the occasions when they had to return to South Africa for major repairs. On the Rhodesia Railways (RR), later the National Railways of Zimbabwe, they worked from Bulawayo to Gwelo and to Wankie and beyond to Victoria Falls.

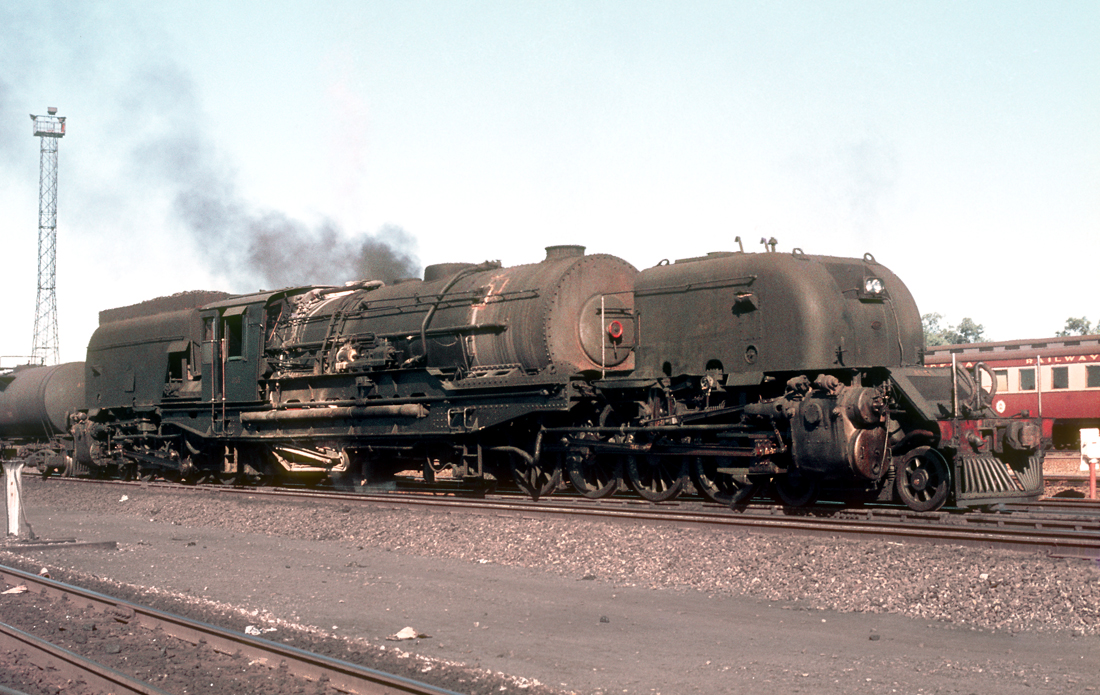
GMAM no. 4065 with raised coal bunker sides at Bulawayo Locoshed, 15 April 1980

Six of these locomotives were loaned by RR to the Caminhos de Ferro de Moçambique (CFM) for a short while to work the CFM Centro line from Beira to Umtali in Zimbabwe.

In Zimbabwe-Rhodesia, these locomotives normally worked chimney first with the water tank at the rear. Since the Rhodesian bush war was still ongoing in 1979, the locomotives were equipped with armour plating around the cab. Since this obscured the number plates, the engine numbers were then usually stencilled on the cabsides. The Class GMAM was similar in size with a similar coal capacity to the Rhodesia Railways 20th class 4-8-2+2-8-4 Garratt, but it had a voracious appetite for coal and frequently ran low on fuel with the result that trains often had to be dumped. In an attempt to solve this problem, RR extended the height of the Class GMAM's coal bunker by a foot to increase the capacity.

26 GMAM Garratts were hired to Rhodesia/Zimbabwe between August 1979 to December 1981

+ 4059 Hired to Rhodesia/Zimbabwe 12/1979 to 07/1981

+ 4060 Hired to Rhodesia/Zimbabwe 08/1979 to 09/1981

+ 4064 Hired to Rhodesia/Zimbabwe 08/1979 to 05/1981

+ 4065 Hired to Rhodesia/Zimbabwe 08/1979 to 03/1981

+ 4070 Hired to Rhodesia/Zimbabwe 08/1980 to 02/1981

+ 4071 Hired to Rhodesia/Zimbabwe 12/1979 to 09/1980

+ 4087 Hired to Rhodesia/Zimbabwe 08/1979 to 09/1981

+ 4089 Hired to Rhodesia/Zimbabwe 08/1979 to 10/1981

+ 4090 Hired to Rhodesia/Zimbabwe 12/1979 to 09/1980

+ 4098 Hired to Rhodesia/Zimbabwe 01/1980 to 09/1981

+ 4099 Hired to Rhodesia/Zimbabwe 12/1979 to 03/1981

+ 4102 Hired to Rhodesia/Zimbabwe 09/1980 to 05/1981

+ 4103 Hired to Rhodesia/Zimbabwe 12/1979 to 02/1981

+ 4111 Hired to Rhodesia/Zimbabwe 02/1980 to 02/1981

+ 4112 Hired to Rhodesia/Zimbabwe 08/1979 to 10/1980

+ 4117 Hired to Rhodesia/Zimbabwe 06/1980 to 02/1981

+ 4120 Hired to Rhodesia/Zimbabwe 08/1979 to 10/1980

+ 4121 Hired to Rhodesia/Zimbabwe 12/1979 to 09/1981

+ 4125 Hired to Rhodesia/Zimbabwe 08/1979 to 04/1980

+ 4126 Hired to Rhodesia/Zimbabwe 12/1979 to 01/1980

+ 4129 Hired to Rhodesia/Zimbabwe 03/1979 to 10/1980

+ 4134 Hired to Rhodesia/Zimbabwe 08/1979 to 10/1980

+ 4135 Hired to Rhodesia/Zimbabwe 08/1979 to 02/1981

+ 4137 Hired to Rhodesia/Zimbabwe 08/1979 to 09/1980

+ 4139 Hired to Rhodesia/Zimbabwe 08/1979 to 08/1981

+ 4140 Hired to Rhodesia/Zimbabwe 12/1979 to 08/1981

=== Industrial, private ownership and preservation ===
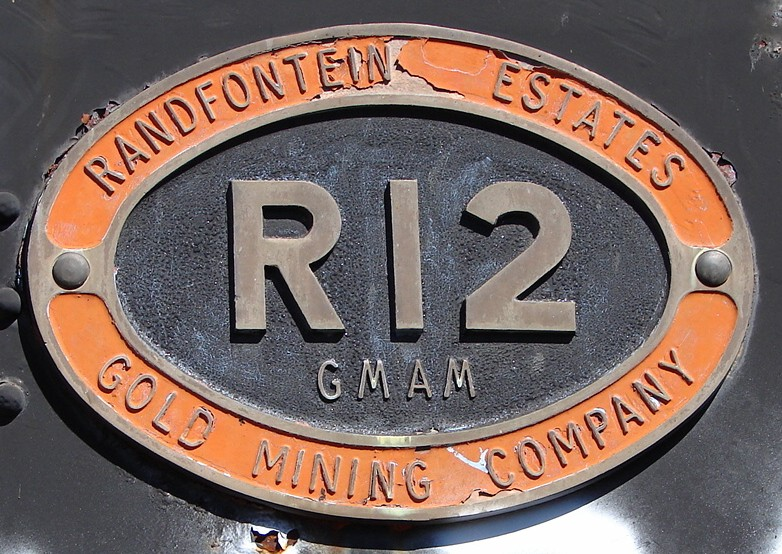
REGM R12 Number plate, ex SAR no. 4136

Several locomotives of the class were sold into industrial service and some later were saved for preservation after being sold on into private ownership. The majority went to the Randfontein Estates Gold Mining Company (REGM). Two were sold to the Hotham Valley Railway in Western Australia where they were to haul tourists in ex SAR passenger coaches. These two locomotives, 4090 and 4129 however, never left South Africa and after standing at Bloemfontein loco for 20 years, they were scrapped in May 2016. 4074 was rebuilt after REGM service with the boiler cradle off 4126 and therefore is shown listed as such per the Beyer Peacock numbering and locomotive identification protocol.

- No. 4059 became REGM's no. R16 first named Sarah then later Wendy, now scrapped
- No. 4060 became REGM's first no. R15 May, now scrapped.
- No. 4073 became REGM's no. R17 Doria, now scrapped.
- No. 4079 became REGM's second no. R15 May later renumbered R1. Today it is on display at the Sandstone Estates.
- No. 4083 became REGM R3. In 1997 after rebuild at Dunn's it went to New Zealand for preservation with Mainline Steam using the power units off 4088 and was steamed there twice. However, the front power unit was found to be bent upon testing in New Zealand and a replacement power unit off the dismantled 4126 was shipped from Dunn's. Today is fitted with the front engine unit of no. 4126 and the rear of no. 4088.
- No. 4084 became REGM's no R9 then after 7/83 R10, Scrapped after a collision 4/85.
- No. 4088 became REGM R2. Sold to the Sandstone Estates but not delivered, it was scrapped on site at REGM after the power units were removed for 4083
- No. 4090 was to go to the Hotham Valley Railway in Western Australia. Scrapped at Bloemfontein Loco, May 2016.
- No. 4107 became REGM's first no. R14 Cherrie, now scrapped.
- No. 4108 went to Tweefontein Colliery, now scrapped.
- No. 4110 became REGM's no. R6, now scrapped.
- No. 4112 first went to England still in operating condition for preservation. It was later moved to the Summerlee Museum of Scottish Industrial Life in Coatbridge, Scotland.
- No. 4114 became REGM's no. R5. Now on display at the Sandstone Estate.
- No. 4119 became REGM's second no. R14 Cherrie, now scrapped.
- No. 4123 became REGM's no. R11 Vivienne, now scrapped.
- No. 4125 was sold to Dunns, first hired to Durnacol and later to Tweefontein Colliery as their no. 2 Margret, now scrapped.
- No. 4126 went to Tweefontein Colliery. Parts including the boiler cradle were later sold to the Umgeni Steam Railway. In April 2010 it was donated to the Creighton municipality who paid for the overhaul when the Umgeni Steam Railway who had gone bankrupt could not afford the cost. Had this not happened, it would have certainly been scrapped. Today (January 2024), it is the only GMA/M cape gauge Garratt in South Africa in operating condition. It runs as 4074 whose power units it uses.
- No. 4128 became REGM's no. R9 Kathy. Later returned to Transnet for excursion service, stored at Voorbaai since 2005.
- No. 4129 was to go to the Hothan Valley Railway in Western Australia. Scrapped at Bloemfontein Loco, May 2016.
- No. 4130 became REGM's no. R8, now scrapped.
- No. 4133 became REGM's second no. R10, now scrapped.
- No. 4135 became REGM's third no. R14 Joan later renumbered R4 and named Barbara. Today it is stored near Pretoria for future use by the German rail tour and charter company FarRail.
- No. 4136 became REGM's no. R12 Barbara. Later returned to Transnet. It is stored today at Bloemfontein.
- No. 4168 was sold to Dunns, first hired to Durnacol and later to Tweefontein Colliery as their no. 1, now scrapped.

== Preservation ==
Number	Builder/Works	THF / Private	Lease-lend / Owner	Current location	Outside S. Africa	Notes
4056	Hensc 28685	THF	THF	Waterval Boven Locomotive Depot		
4070	Hensc 28699	THF	THF	George Transport Museum		Oil fired
4074 (4126)	Hensc 28703	Private	Creighton Municipality	Creighton		
4079	BP 7677	Private	Sandstone Estate	On display at the Sandstone Estate		
4083	BP 7681	Private	Mainline steam	Mercer	New Zealand	
4112	BP 7827 / NBL 27770	Private	Summerlee Museum of Scottish Industrial Life	Coatbridge	Scotland	
4114	BP 7829 / NBL 27772	Private	Sandstone Estate	On display at the Sandstone Estate		
4122	BP 7837	THF	THF	Voorbaai Locomotive Depot		
4128	BP 7843	THF	THF	Voorbaai Locomotive Depot		
4135	BP 7850 / NBL 27787	Private	FarRail	Hermanstad		
4136	BP 7851 / NBL 27788	THF	Bloemfontein Locomotive Depot			

== Works numbers ==
The builders, works numbers and years built of these locomotives are listed in the table.

Class GMA & GMAM Builders and works numbers
SAR no.	Builders	Works no.	NBL Works no.	Year
4051	Henschel	28680		1953
4052	Henschel	28681		1953
4053	Henschel	28682		1953
4054	Henschel	28683		1953
4055	Henschel	28684		1953
4056	Henschel	28685		1953
4057	Henschel	28686		1953
4058	Henschel	28687		1953
4059	Henschel	28688		1953
4060	Henschel	28689		1953
4061	Henschel	28690		1953
4062	Henschel	28691		1953
4063	Henschel	28692		1953
4064	Henschel	28693		1953
4065	Henschel	28694		1953
4066	Henschel	28695		1953
4067	Henschel	28696		1953
4068	Henschel	28697		1953
4069	Henschel	28698		1953
4070	Henschel	28699		1953
4071	Henschel	28700		1953
4072	Henschel	28701		1953
4073	Henschel	28702		1953
4074	Henschel	28703		1953
4075	Henschel	28704		1953
4076	BP	7550		1956
4077	BP	7551		1956
4078	BP	7552		1956
4079	BP	7677		1956
4080	BP	7678		1956
4081	BP	7679		1956
4082	BP	7680		1956
4083	BP	7681		1956
4084	BP	7750		1956
4085	BP	7751		1956
4086	BP	7752		1956
4087	BP	7753		1956
4088	BP	7754		1956
4089	BP	7755		1956
4090	BP	7756		1956
4091	BP	7757		1956
4092	BP	7758		1956
4093	BP	7759		1956
4094	BP	7760		1956
4095	BP	7761		1956
4096	BP	7762		1956
4097	BP	7763		1956
4098	BP	7764		1956
4099	BP/NBL	7765	27691	1956
4100	BP/NBL	7766	27692	1956
4101	BP/NBL	7767	27693	1956
4102	BP/NBL	7768	27694	1956
4103	BP/NBL	7769	27695	1956
4104	BP/NBL	7770	27696	1956
4105	BP/NBL	7771	27697	1956
4106	BP/NBL	7772	27698	1956
4107	BP/NBL	7773	27699	1956
4108	BP/NBL	7774	27700	1956
4109	BP/NBL	7775	27701	1956
4110	BP/NBL	7776	27702	1956
4111	BP/NBL	7826	27769	1958
4112	BP/NBL	7827	27770	1958
4113	BP/NBL	7828	27771	1958
4114	BP/NBL	7829	27772	1958
4115	BP/NBL	7830	27773	1958
4116	BP/NBL	7831	27774	1958
4117	BP/NBL	7832	27775	1958
4118	BP/NBL	7833	27776	1958
4119	BP/NBL	7834	27777	1958
4120	BP/NBL	7835	27778	1958
4121	BP	7836		1958
4122	BP	7837		1958
4123	BP	7838		1958
4124	BP	7839		1958
4125	BP	7840		1958
4126	BP	7841		1958
4127	BP	7842		1958
4128	BP	7843		1958
4129	BP	7844		1958
4130	BP	7845		1958
4131	BP/NBL	7846	27783	1958
4132	BP/NBL	7847	27784	1958
4133	BP/NBL	7848	27785	1958
4134	BP/NBL	7849	27786	1958
4135	BP/NBL	7850	27787	1958
4136	BP/NBL	7851	27788	1958
4137	BP/NBL	7852	27789	1958
4138	BP/NBL	7853	27790	1958
4139	BP/NBL	7854	27791	1958
4140	BP/NBL	7855	27792	1958
4141	Henschel	29600		1958
4142	Henschel	29601		1958
4143	Henschel	29602		1958
4144	Henschel	29603		1958
4145	Henschel	29604		1958
4146	Henschel	29605		1958
4147	Henschel	29606		1958
4148	Henschel	29607		1958
4149	Henschel	29608		1958
4150	Henschel	29609		1958
4151	Henschel	29610		1958
4152	Henschel	29611		1958
4153	Henschel	29612		1958
4154	Henschel	29613		1958
4155	Henschel	29614		1958
4156	Henschel	29615		1958
4157	Henschel	29616		1958
4158	Henschel	29617		1958
4159	Henschel	29618		1958
4160	Henschel	29619		1958
4161	Henschel	29620		1958
4162	Henschel	29621		1958
4163	Henschel	29622		1958
4164	Henschel	29623		1958
4165	Henschel	29624		1958
4166	Henschel	29625		1958
4167	Henschel	29626		1958
4168	Henschel	29627		1958
4169	Henschel	29628		1958
4170	Henschel	29629		1958

== Illustration ==
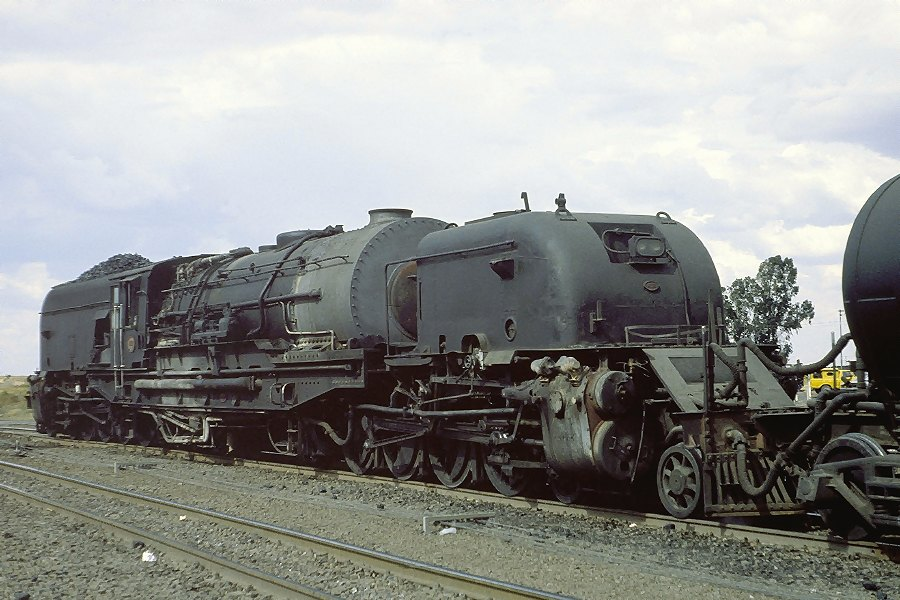
GMAM no. 4117 at Vryburg station, en route to Mafeking, 16 April 1983

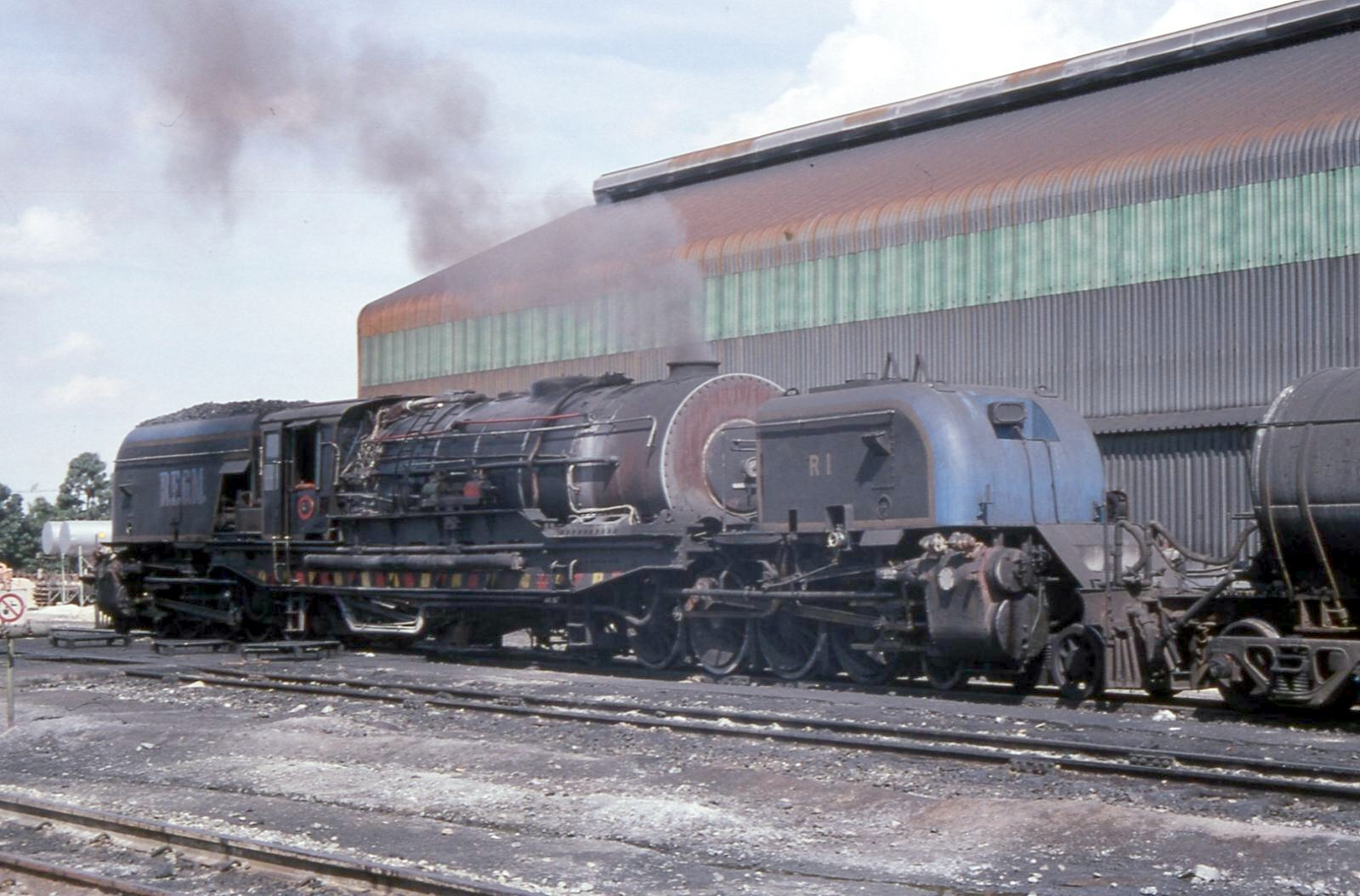
Randfontein Estates Gold Mine's no. R1, c. 1993

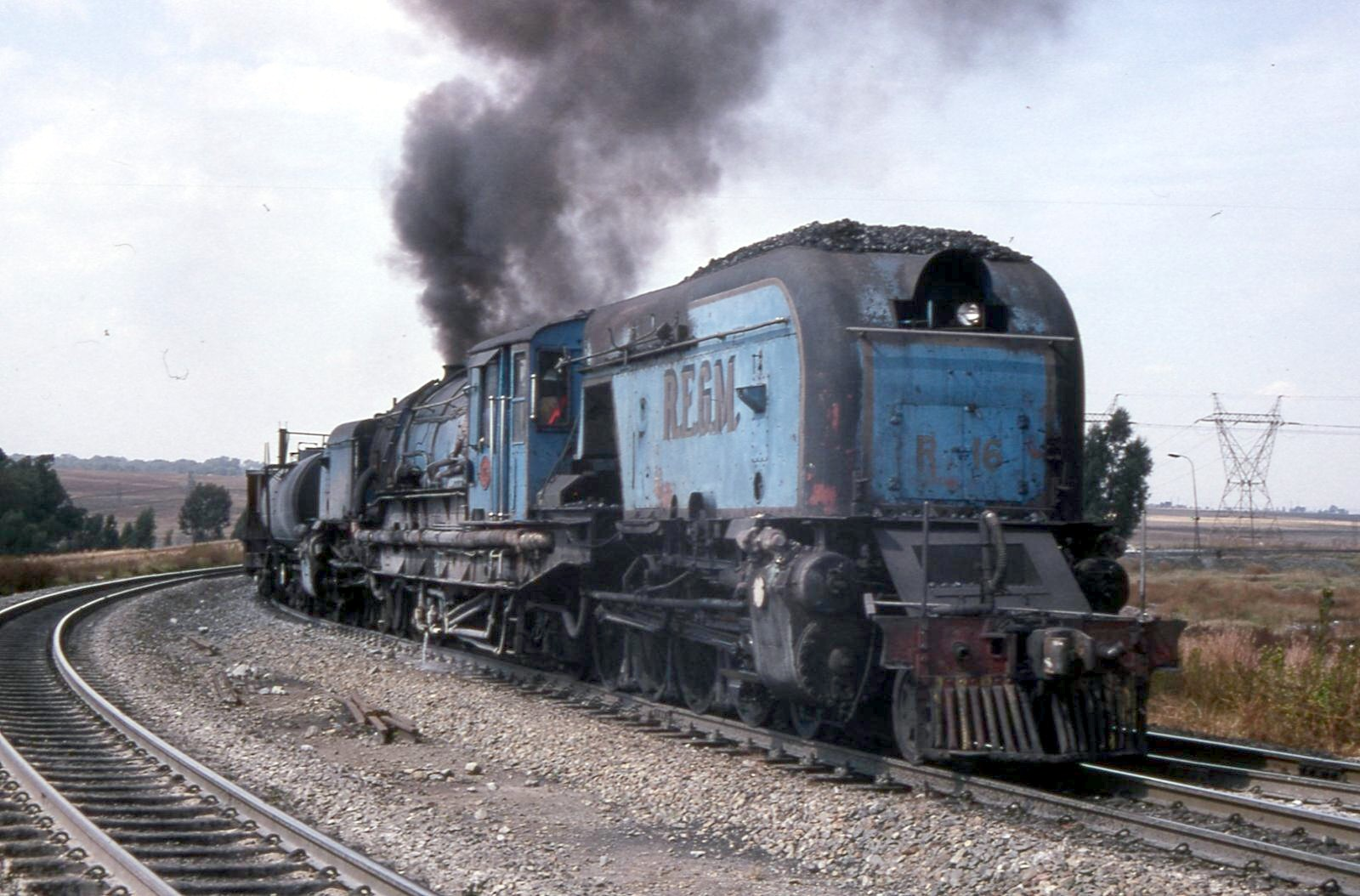
Ex SAR no. 4059, REGM no. R16 Sarah, c. 1993

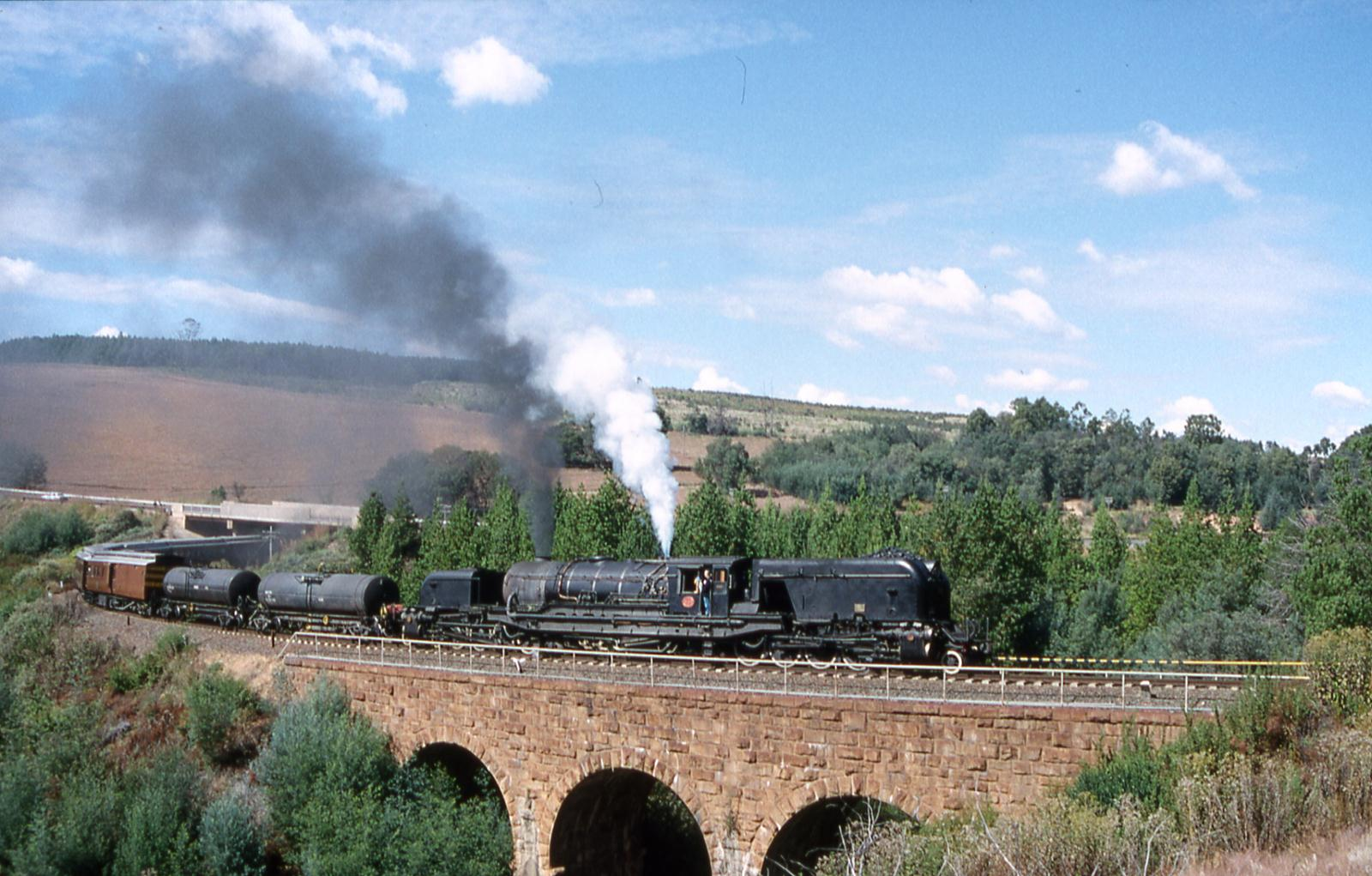
GMAM no. 4122 on a tourist special train at Santa, c. 1993

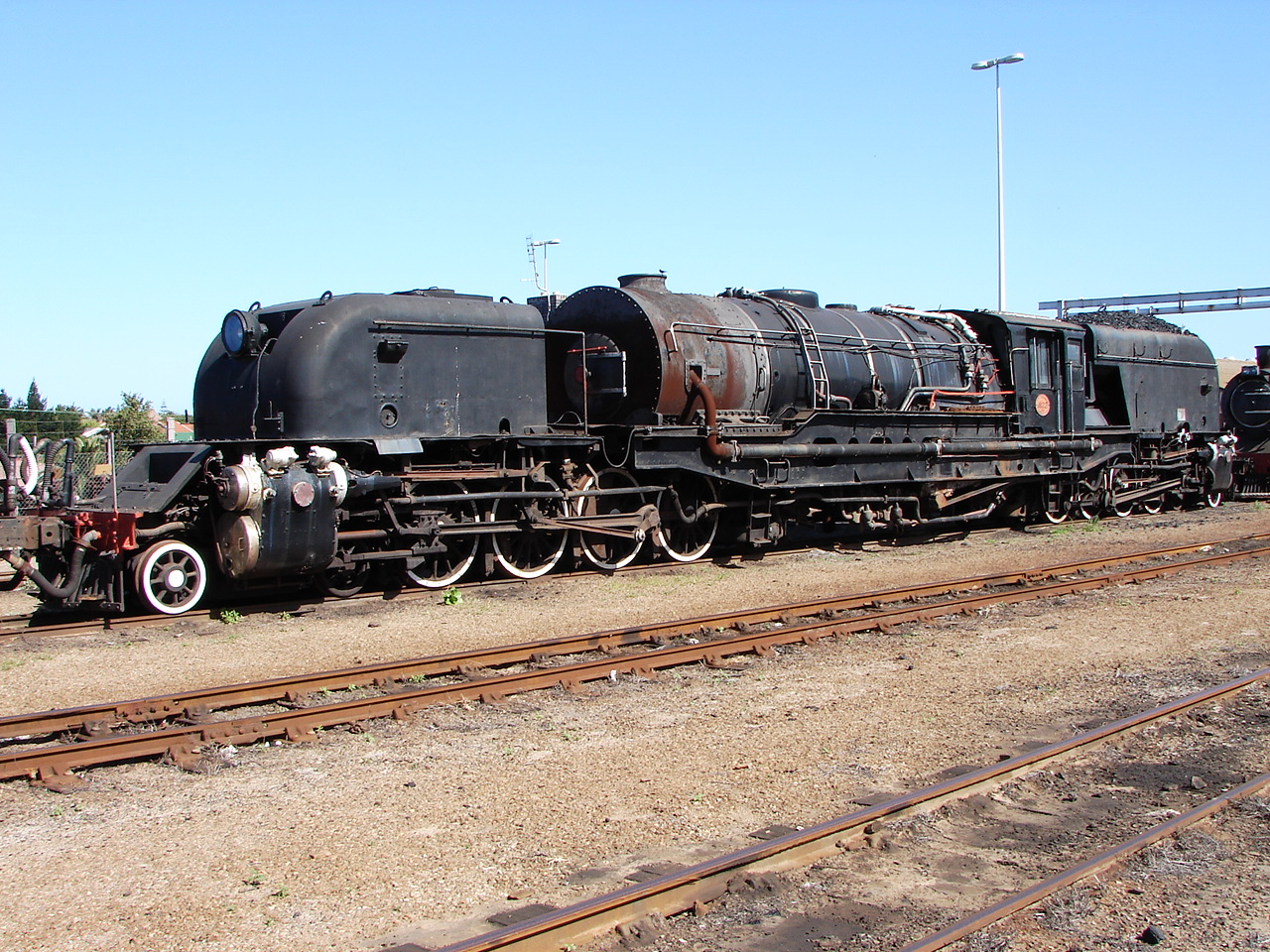
GMAM no. 4122 staged at Voorbaai awaiting restoration, 19 October 2009

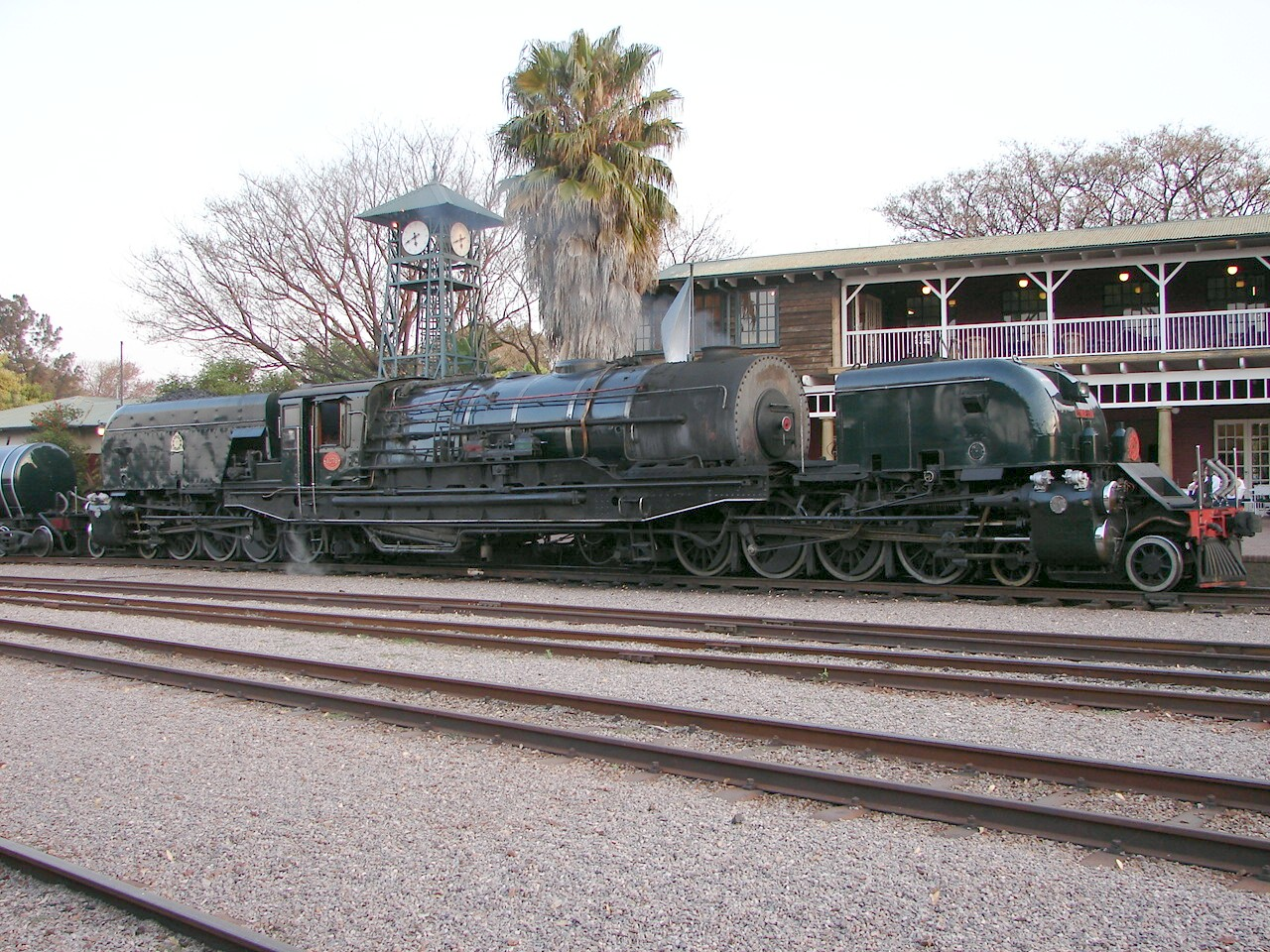
GMAM no. 4079 at Rovos Rail in Capital Park, 28 September 2006
