= South African type X-20 water tender =

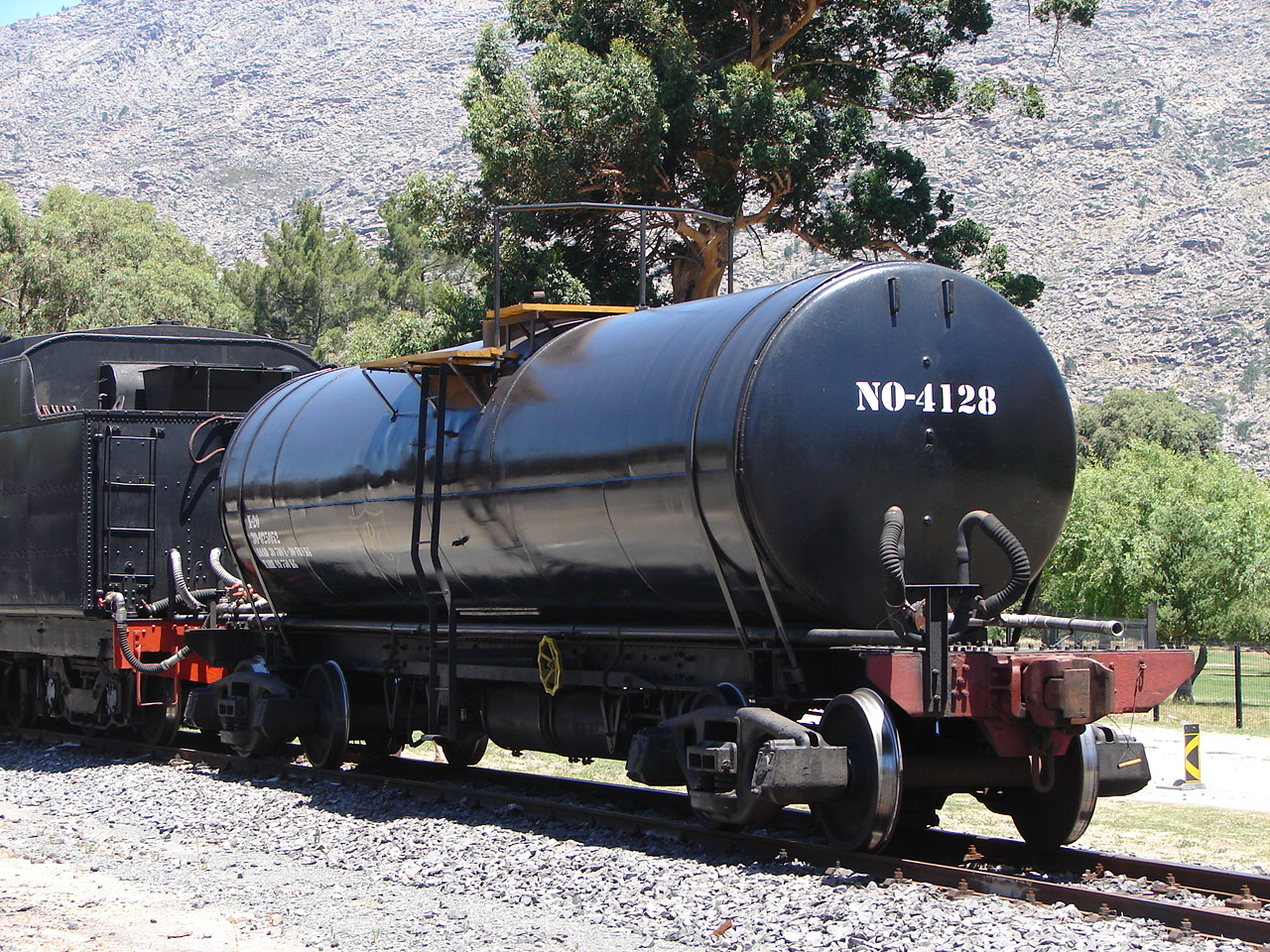
- Type X-20 water tender no. 4128, 31 December 2016
Type and origin
- Locomotive: Class GMA
- Designer: South African Railways (L.C. Grubb)
- Builder: South African Railways
- In service: 1956-1958
Specifications
- Configuration: 2-axle bogies
- Gauge: 3 ft 6 in (1,067 mm) Cape gauge
- Length: 43 ft 10 3/4 in (13,379 mm)
- Width: 8 ft 3 in (2,515 mm)
- Height: 11 ft 7 1/4 in (3,537 mm)
- Bogies: SARCAST
- Wheel dia.: 34 in (864 mm)
- Wheelbase: 35 ft 9 in (10,897 mm)
  - Bogie: 5 ft 9 in (1,753 mm)
- Axle load: 12 LT 12 cwt 1 qtr (12,810 kg)
  - Bogie: 25 LT 4 cwt 2 qtr (25,630 kg)
- Weight empty: 44,910 lb (20,370 kg)
- Weight w/o: 50 LT 9 cwt 1 qtr (51,270 kg)
- Water cap.: 6,790 imp gal (30,900 L)
- Couplers: AAR knuckle (SASKOP S)
Career
- Operators: South African Railways
- Numbers: 4076-4170 (possibly to 4175)

The South African type X-20 water tender was a Garratt steam locomotive tender.

Type X-20 water tenders first entered service in 1956, as auxiliary water tenders to the second batch of Class GMA 4-8-2+2-8-4 Double Mountain type Garratt steam locomotives which entered service on the South African Railways in that year.

== Manufacturer ==
The Type X-20 water tenders were built by the South African Railways (SAR) in its Pietermaritzburg shops between 1956 and 1958.

Altogether 95 more Class GMA Garratt articulated steam locomotives with a 4-8-2+2-8-4 Double Mountain type wheel arrangement entered service on the SAR between 1956 and 1958. Like the Classes GM and GO, the Class GMA was a tank-and-tender Garratt which ran with a semi-permanently coupled purpose-built auxiliary water tender to augment its meagre water capacity.

The Type X-20 water tender entered service as tenders to these 95 locomotives.

== Characteristics ==
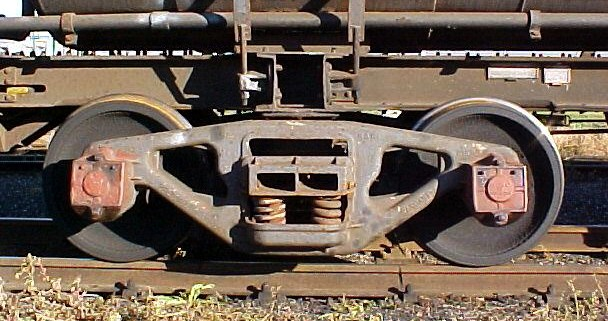
SARCAST bogie

The water tenders had a low flat-topped turret with a hinged hatch and a curved handrail across the tank barrel, similar to that of the Type MX tender. It had a water capacity of 30,900 litres (6,797 imperial gallons; 8,163 US gallons), with a tank barrel of 1,975 millimetres (6 feet 5.8 inches) diameter inside and 10,312 millimetres (33 feet 10 inches) long. It rode on SARCAST bogies (similar to North American Bettendorf trucks) with coil springs. The vehicles were 13,380 millimetres (43 feet 10.8 inches) long over the coupler faces and 12,496 millimetres (41 feet) across the buffer beams.

== Locomotives ==
Only the second and third batches of Class GMA locomotives, 95 in total and numbered in the range from 4051 to 4170, were equipped with Type X-20 water tenders upon entering service. 100 of these water tenders were built and were originally numbered for these engines in the number range as shown, while the numbers of the five extra tenders possibly followed on to no. 4175. The tenders were painted black with red buffer beams. When the SAR adopted a computerised goods wagon numbering system, the Type X-20 water tenders were allocated numbers in the range from 30 025 036 to 30 026 024 (short numbers 2503 to 2602). A known example of the renumbering is Type X-20 no. 4128, which was renumbered to 30 025 052 (short number 2505).

== Preservation ==
After the end of steam operations in the late 1980s, most of the watering facilities which once existed country-wide have either fallen into disuse or been removed. The Ceres-based Ceres Rail Company therefore often operate their preserved Classes 19B and 19D steam locomotives with preserved auxiliary water tenders to extend their water range.

== Illustration ==
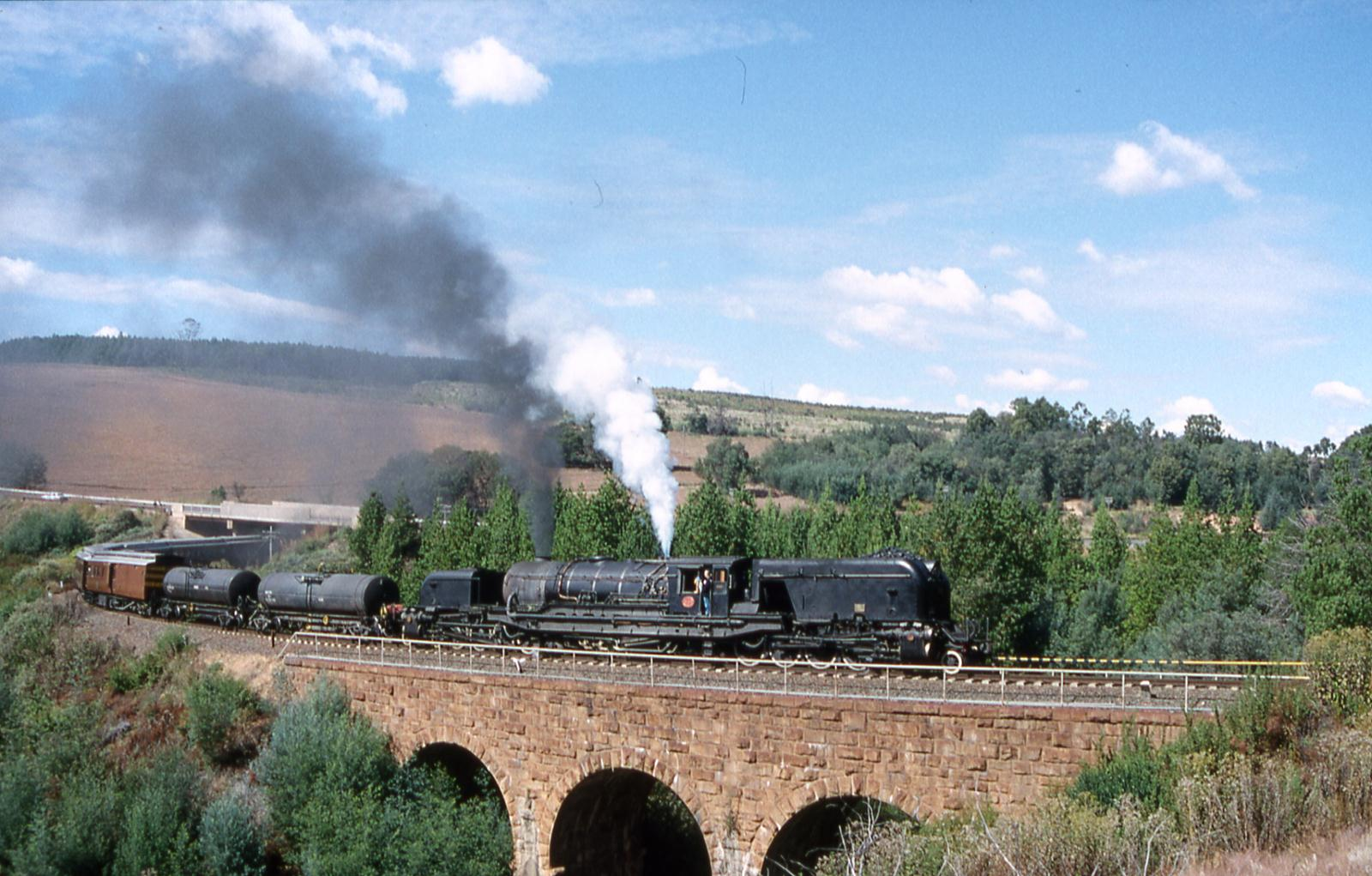
Two water tenders on Class GMAM no. 4122, c. 1993

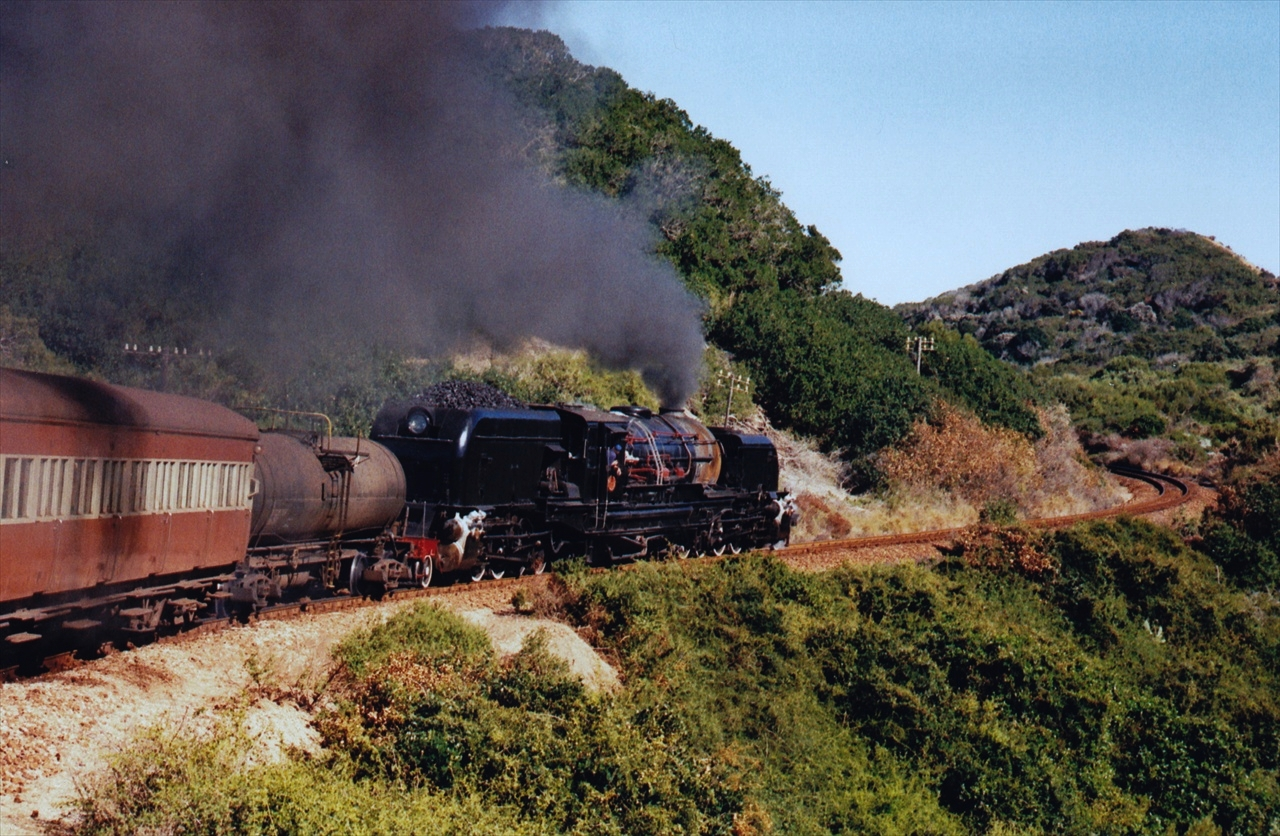
Water tender on Class GMAM no. 4122, 2005

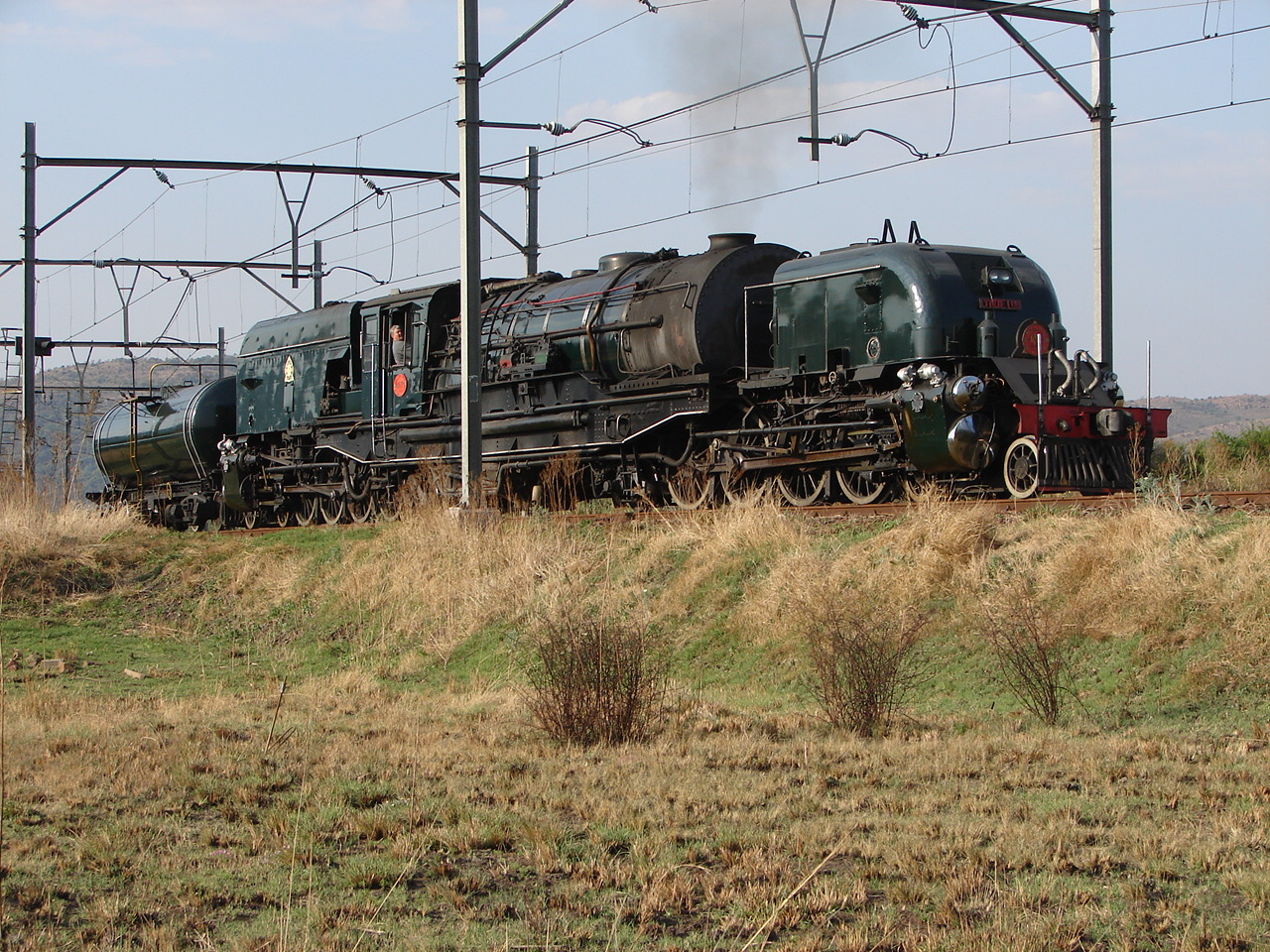
Water tender on Class GMAM no. 4079, 2006

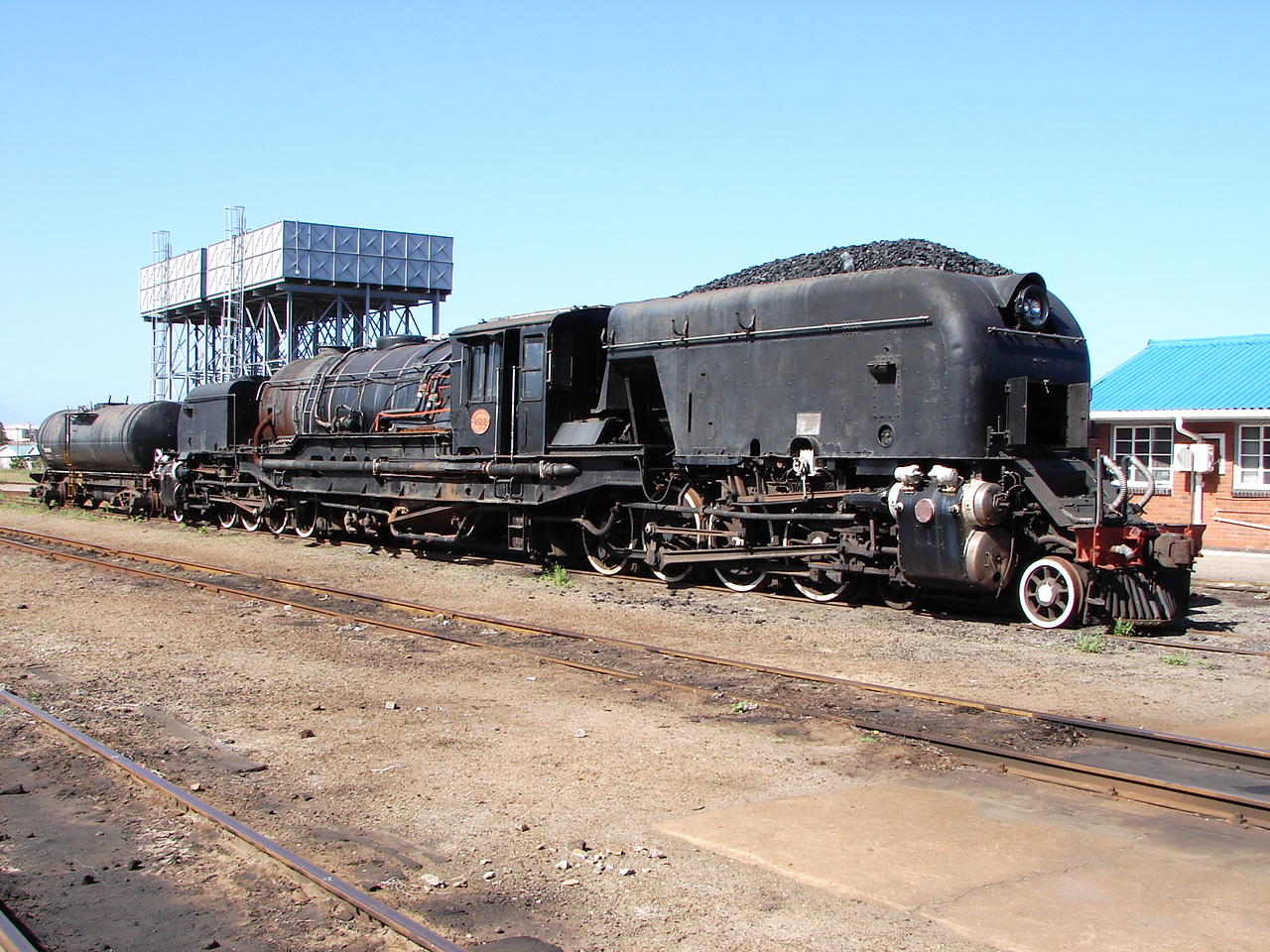
Water tender on Class GMAM no. 4122, 2009
