= South African Class 12A 4-8-2 =

1919 design of steam locomotive

South African Class 12A & 12AR 4-8-2
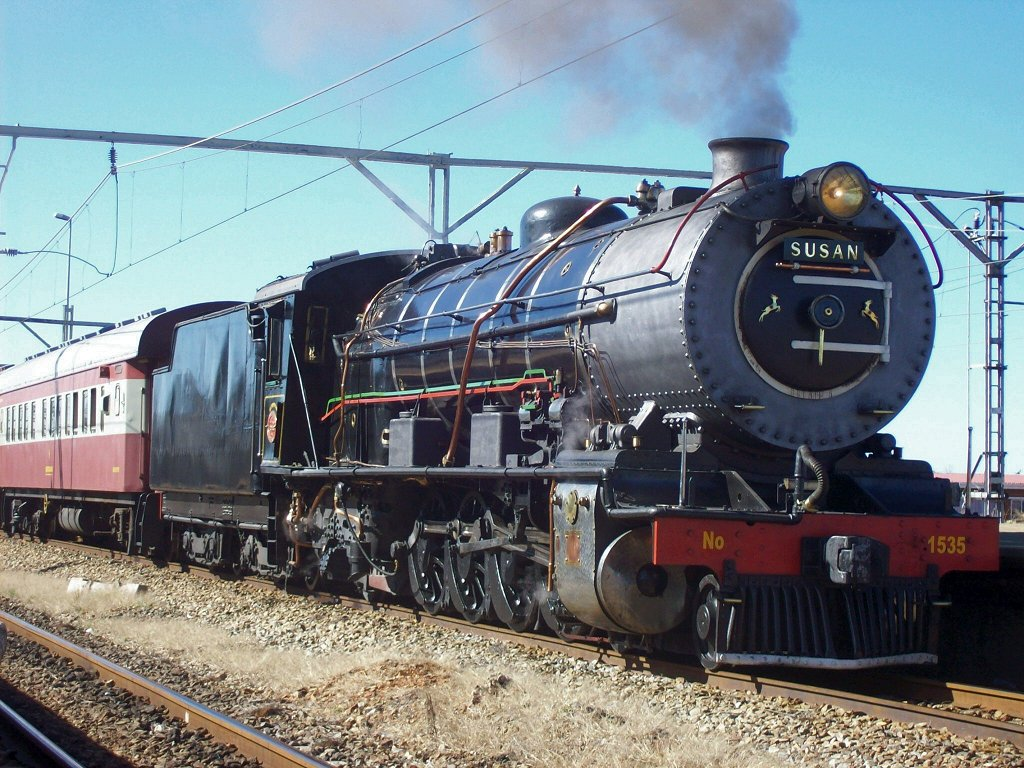
- Class 12AR no. 1535 at Maraisburg, 27 April 2009
Type and origin
- ♠ Class 12A as built with a Belpaire firebox ♥ Class 12AR rebuilt with a round-topped firebox ♣ Type MP1 tender – ♦ Type MT tender
- Power type: Steam
- Designer: South African Railways (D.A. Hendrie)
- Builder: North British Locomotive Company; Henschel and Son
- Serial number: NBL 21738-21757, 22751-22765, 23891-23903; Henschel 21046-21051, 21428-21440
- Model: Class 12A
- Build date: 1919–1929
- Total produced: 75
Specifications
- Configuration
  - Whyte: 4-8-2 (Mountain)
  - UIC: 2'D1'h2
- Driver: 2nd coupled axle
- Gauge: 3 ft 6 in (1,067 mm) Cape gauge
- Leading dia.: 28 1/2 in (724 mm)
- Coupled dia.: 51 in (1,295 mm)
- Trailing dia.: 33 in (838 mm)
- Tender wheels: 34 in (864 mm)
- Wheelbase: ♣ 58 ft 7 1/4 in (17,863 mm) ♦ 61 ft 7 3/8 in (18,780 mm)
  - Engine: 32 ft 1 in (9,779 mm)
  - Leading: 6 ft 2 in (1,880 mm)
  - Coupled: 13 ft 6 in (4,115 mm)
  - Tender: ♣ 16 ft 9 in (5,105 mm) ♦ 20 ft 5 in (6,223 mm)
  - Tender bogie: ♣ 4 ft 7 in (1,397 mm) ♦ 6 ft 2 in (1,880 mm)
- Length
  - Over couplers: ♣ 66 ft 11 5/8 in (20,412 mm) ♦ 69 ft 7 in (21,209 mm)
- Height: ♠ 12 ft 10 in (3,912 mm) ♥ 13 ft (3,962 mm)
- Frame type: Plate
- Axle load: ♠ 17 LT 6 cwt (17,580 kg) ♥ 17 LT 8 cwt (17,680 kg)
  - Leading: ♠ 17 LT 6 cwt (17,580 kg) ♥ 17 LT 14 cwt (17,980 kg)
  - 1st coupled: ♠ 17 LT 6 cwt (17,580 kg) ♥ 17 LT (17,270 kg)
  - 2nd coupled: ♠ 17 LT 5 cwt (17,530 kg) ♥ 17 LT 4 cwt (17,480 kg)
  - 3rd coupled: ♠ 17 LT 6 cwt (17,580 kg) ♥ 17 LT 8 cwt (17,680 kg)
  - 4th coupled: ♠ 17 LT 6 cwt (17,580 kg) ♥ 17 LT 7 cwt (17,630 kg)
  - Trailing: ♠♥ 12 LT 12 cwt (12,800 kg)
  - Tender bogie: Bogie 1: ♣ 27 LT 10 cwt (27,940 kg) ♦ 32 LT 18 cwt (33,430 kg); Bogie 2: ♣ 23 LT 11 cwt (23,930 kg) ♦ 33 LT 2 cwt (33,630 kg)
  - Tender axle: ♣ 13 LT 15 cwt (13,970 kg) ♦ 16 LT 11 cwt (16,820 kg)
- Adhesive weight: ♠ 69 LT 3 cwt (70,260 kg) ♥ 68 LT 19 cwt (70,060 kg)
- Loco weight: ♠ 99 LT 1 cwt (100,600 kg) ♥ 99 LT 5 cwt (100,800 kg)
- Tender weight: ♣ 51 LT 1 cwt (51,870 kg) ♦ 66 LT (67,060 kg)
- Total weight: ♠♣ 150 LT 2 cwt (152,500 kg) ♥♣ 150 LT 6 cwt (152,700 kg) ♠♦ 165 LT 1 cwt (167,700 kg) ♥♦ 165 LT 5 cwt (167,900 kg)
- Tender type: ♣ MP1 (2-axle bogies) ♦ MT (2-axle bogies); MP, MP1, MR, MS, MT, MT1, MT2, MX, MY, MY1 permitted
- Fuel type: Coal
- Fuel capacity: ♣ 10 LT (10.2 t) ♦ 12 LT (12.2 t)
- Water cap.: ♣ 4,250 imp gal (19,300 L) ♦ 6,000 imp gal (27,300 L)
- Firebox
  - Type: ♠ Belpaire – ♥ Round-top
  - Grate area: ♠ 40.5 sq ft (3.76 m^{2}) ♥ 41 sq ft (3.8 m^{2})
- Boiler
  - Pitch: ♠ 7 ft 9 in (2,362 mm) ♥ 8 ft 6 in (2,591 mm)
  - Diameter: ♠ 5 ft 10 1/2 in (1,791 mm) ♥ 6 ft (1,829 mm)
  - Tube plates: ♠ 18 ft (5,486 mm) ♥ 19 ft 4 in (5,893 mm)
  - Small tubes: ♠ 159: 2 1/4 in (57 mm) ♥ 119: 2 1/2 in (64 mm)
  - Large tubes: ♠ 24 5 1/2 in (140 mm) ♥ 30: 5 1/2 in (140 mm)
- Boiler pressure: ♠♥ 190 psi (1,310 kPa)
- Safety valve: ♠ Ramsbottom – ♥ Ross Pop
- Heating surface
  - Firebox: ♠ 209 sq ft (19.4 m^{2}) ♥ 164 sq ft (15.2 m^{2})
  - Tubes: ♠ 2,301 sq ft (213.8 m^{2}) ♥ 2,338 sq ft (217.2 m^{2})
  - Total surface: ♠ 2,510 sq ft (233 m^{2}) ♥ 2,502 sq ft (232.4 m^{2})
- Superheater
  - Heating area: ♠ 466 sq ft (43.3 m^{2}) ♥ 480 sq ft (45 m^{2})
- Cylinders: Two
- Cylinder size: 24 in (610 mm) bore 26 in (660 mm) stroke
- Valve gear: Walschaerts
- Valve type: Piston
- Couplers: Johnston link-and-pin AAR knuckle (1930s)
Performance figures
- Tractive effort: ♠♥ 41,840 lbf (186.1 kN) @ 75%
Career
- Operators: South African Railways
- Class: Class 12A & 12AR
- Number in class: SAR 67, Industrial 8
- Numbers: 1520–1550, 2103–2138
- Delivered: 1919–1929
- First run: 1919
- Withdrawn: 1980s
- The leading coupled axle had flangeless wheels

The South African Railways Class 12A 4-8-2 of 1919 was a steam locomotive.

Between 1919 and 1929, the South African Railways placed 67 Class 12A steam locomotives with a 4-8-2 Mountain type wheel arrangement in service. Between 1947 and 1953, eight were also built for industrial use.

== Manufacturers ==
The Class 12A was the final locomotive design by D.A. Hendrie, Chief Mechanical Engineer (CME) of the South African Railways (SAR) from 1910 to 1922, and one of his finest. It was an improved and larger version of his Class 12 locomotive, with larger diameter cylinders to increase tractive effort and a redesigned boiler.

Between 1919 and 1929, altogether 67 of them were built on five orders, 48 by the North British Locomotive Company (NBL) in Scotland and 19 by Henschel and Son in Kassel, Germany.

- The first twenty were built by NBL and were delivered in 1919, numbered in the range from 1520 to 1539.
- These were followed by another fifteen from NBL, which were built in late 1919 but were only delivered in 1921, numbered in the range from 2111 to 2125.
- The Henschel-built locomotives only arrived several years later. Six were delivered in 1928 and numbered in the range from 1540 to 1545.
- Another thirteen were delivered by Henschel in 1929, numbered in the ranges from 1546 to 1550 and 2103 to 2110, filling the gaps in the numbering sequence.
- The final thirteen, once again built by NBL, were also delivered in 1929 and numbered in the range from 2126 to 2138.

== Characteristics ==
At the time, these locomotives were of the maximum size permissible for the Mountain type on Cape gauge. They were designed primarily to supplement the Class 12 locomotives which were already working on the coal line between Witbank and Germiston. Since these engines had a slightly heavier axle load than the predecessor Class 12, it was foreseen that they would be able to take a slightly increased load on the Witbank-Germiston section.

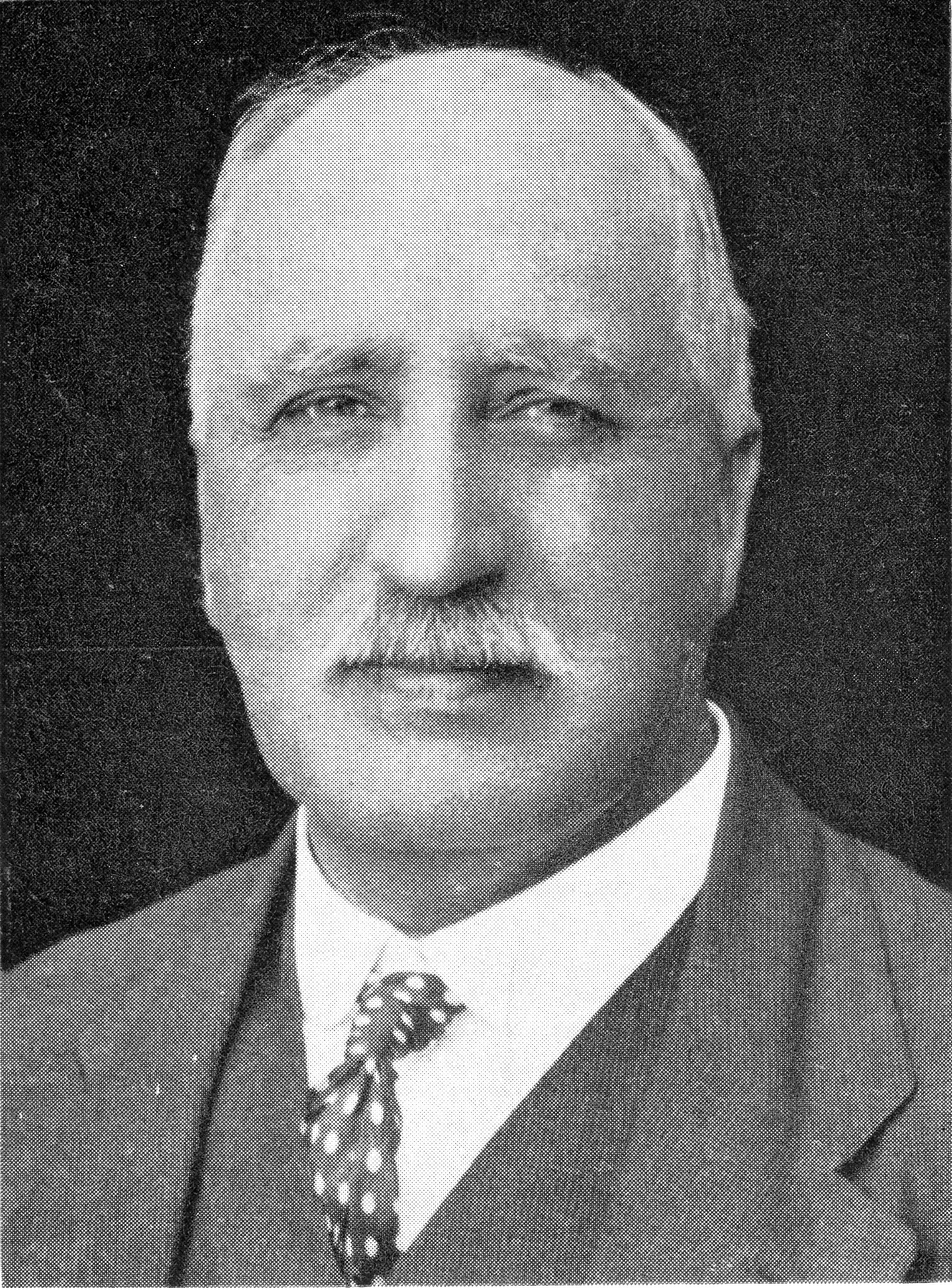
D.A. Hendrie

The locomotives were built on 1 1/2-inch thick (38-millimetre) plate frames. They were superheated and had piston valves, Walschaerts valve gear and Belpaire fireboxes which included combustion chambers. The boilers of the first two batches of 1919 and 1921 were equipped with Ramsbottom safety valves, while works pictures of the remainder show that they were equipped with Ross pop safety valves. The feedwater supply of the third and subsequent batches was by a top feed arrangement through copper pipes which were run from the running boards on each side to the top of the boiler ahead of the steam dome.

The original Class 12A superheater header was arranged with the Gresley type air valve which was introduced to prevent the risk of superheater elements being burned or damaged by overheating while engines were drifting. The valve automatically opened when the regulator was closed and allowed outside air to be drawn into the superheater elements. Even though experience showed that the heated air which then entered the steam chests and cylinders was harmful to cylinder lubrication with no apparent effect on the life of the superheater elements, it was some years before the use of these air valves was finally discontinued.

The first two batches, delivered in 1919 and 1921, were equipped with the Johnston link-and-pin couplers which had been in use since the establishment of the Cape Government Railways in 1873. By the time the third batch arrived in 1928, the SAR had begun to convert its Cape Gauge rolling stock to AAR knuckle couplers. The third to fifth batches were therefore delivered with the new coupling system.

== Tenders ==
The locomotives were delivered new with two tender types, the Types MP1 and MT. While sources are unclear about which batches of the Class 12A were delivered with which tender type, builder's works photographs show the NBL-built locomotives of 1919 and 1921 with Type MP1 tenders, and the Henschel-built and subsequent NBL-built locomotives with Type MT tenders.

=== Type MP1 tender ===
On the Type MP1 tender, the top of its coal bunker sides were distinctly separate, mounted within the top edging of the water tank. It had a fuel capacity of 10 long tons (10.2 tonnes) and a water capacity of 4,250 imperial gallons (19,300 litres), with a 13 long tons 15 hundredweight (13,970 kilograms) axle load.

Many of these tenders were subsequently rebuilt to smooth-sided Type MR tenders with a 4,600 imperial gallons (20,900 litres) water capacity and a 13 long tons 14 hundredweight (13,920 kilograms) axle load.

=== Type MT tender ===
The heavier Type MT tender had smooth sides all the way to the top of the coal bunker. It had a fuel capacity of 12 long tons (12.2 tonnes) and a water capacity of 6,000 imperial gallons (27,300 litres), with a 16 long tons 11 hundredweight (16,820 kilograms) axle load.

== Reboilering ==
During the 1930s, many serving locomotives were reboilered with a standard boiler type designed by then CME A.G. Watson as part of his standardisation policy. In the process, they were then also equipped with Watson cabs with their distinctive slanted fronts, compared to the conventional vertical fronts of the original cabs. Such Watson Standard reboilered locomotives were reclassified by adding an "R" suffix to their classification.

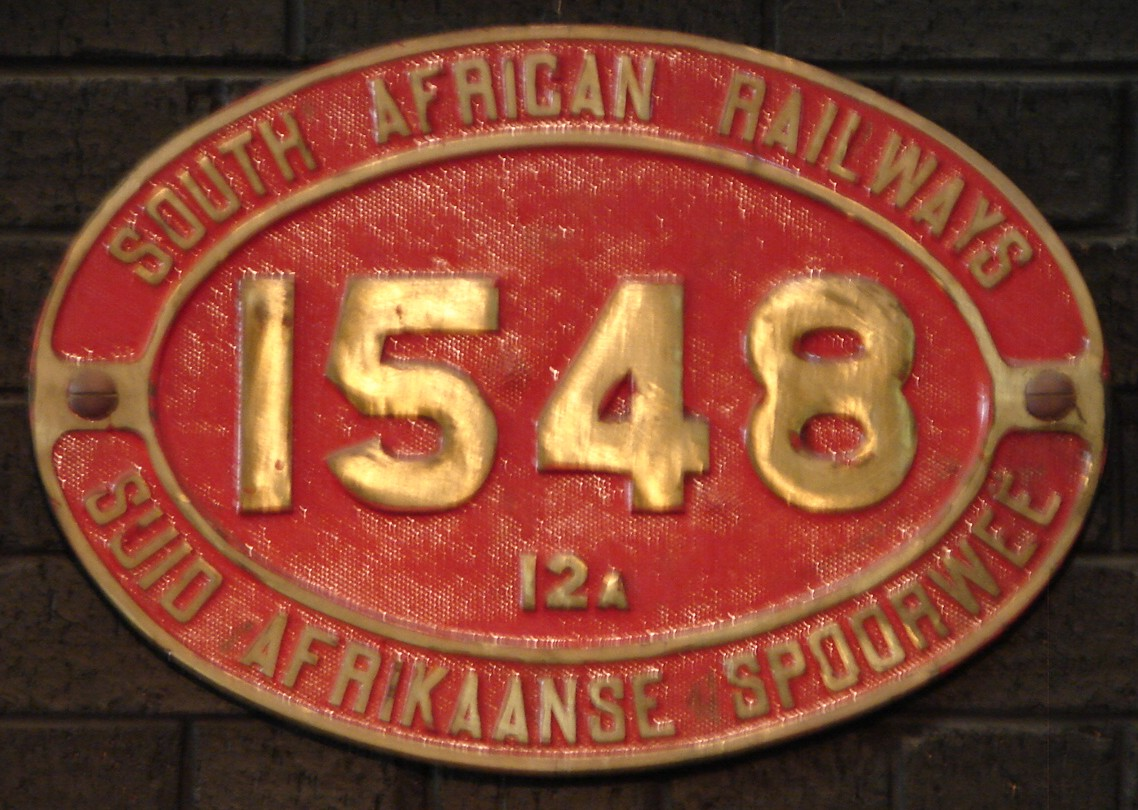

When Class 12A locomotives numbers 1540 and 2135 became the first to be reboilered in 1943, however, none of the Watson Standard boilers were deemed suitable since the Watson Standard no. 2 series were too small, while the no. 3 series were too large. A special boiler was therefore designed for them by Dr. M.M. Loubser, the CME at the time. These boilers did not conform to any of the Watson Standard boilers and were a totally new type of rather massive proportions which, on a locomotive with relatively small coupled wheels, created an impression of great power. Certain features common to the Watson Standard boilers were incorporated in the design, however, since it was deemed necessary to have the greatest possible degree of interchangeability of parts with those of the Watson Standard boilers. The boiler size was between that of the Watson Standard numbers 2 and 3 boilers.

Unlike the original Class 12A boilers, initial and in-service repair cost considerations led to the Loubser boiler being built without a combustion chamber. The round-top firebox was radially stayed and the first two rows of stays were flexible. Similar stays were fitted in the side, back and throat plates and in the breaking zones. There were eight cross stays over the top of the firebox, which was of steel.

The original Belpaire boilers were fitted with Ramsbottom safety valves while, like the Watson Standard boilers, the Loubser boiler was fitted with two 3 1/2 inches (89 millimetres) Ross pop safety valves. Feedwater was supplied by two Davies and Metcalf injectors through a top-feed arrangement. At the firebox, the boiler was carried by a vertical transverse plate at the back and at the two front corners by sliding grease-lubricated shoes which rested on gunmetal liner plates which, in turn, were fixed to specially designed steel brackets welded to the inside of the bridle casting. The boiler barrel was attached to the engine frame by four diaphragm plates, bolted to "T" sections which were riveted to the barrel.

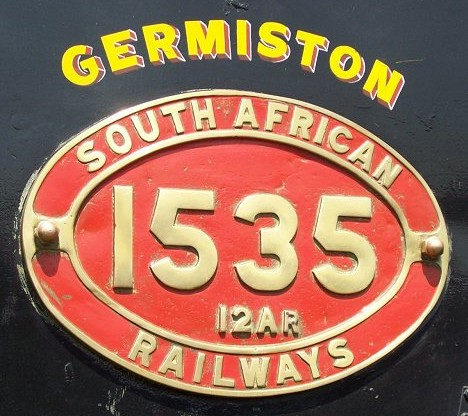

Altogether 44 Class 12A locomotives were eventually reboilered with Loubser boilers and reclassified to Class 12AR. During the reboilering, which included the installation of Watson cabs, the locomotives were also equipped with a longer smokebox which resulted in the distinctive appearance of the Class 12AR. Like the Watson Standard boilers, the Loubser boilers also had the distinctive rectangular regulator cover just to the rear of the chimney. In the case of the Classes 12A and 12AR locomotives, three even more obvious differences are the extended smokebox, the Watson cab and the absence of the Belpaire firebox hump between the cab and boiler on the reboilered locomotives.

The reboilered locomotives were considered by some enginemen to be inferior steamers compared to the as-built engines. A shortened version of Loubser's Class 12AR boiler was later used on the new Class S1 shunting locomotives.

== Service ==
=== South African Railways ===
When new, the Class 12A locomotives were placed in service hauling coal on the section from Witbank to Germiston. The unreboilered locomotives spent a large part of their working lives in Transvaal, mainly in Western Transvaal and shedded at Springs and Germiston, a few in Eastern Transvaal and shedded at Nelspruit and Waterval Boven, and one at De Aar in the Cape Province. The class also served in Natal during the late 1920s, probably after the arrival in numbers of the Class 15CA in 1929. Here they were worth two more coaches than a Class 14 on the 1921 mainline between Durban and Pietermaritzburg. A Class 12A locomotive was in charge of the last steam-hauled mainline passenger train to depart from Durban station after electric traction reached Durban from Pietermaritzburg during 1936. In 1977, all the remaining Class 12A locomotives were relocated to the Cape Northern system for shunting at De Aar and at Beaconsfield in Kimberley.

The more numerous reboilered Class 12AR locomotives worked throughout most parts of South Africa, being shedded at Kimberley, De Aar, Port Elizabeth and East London in the Cape Province, Glencoe and Newcastle in Natal, Klerksdorp in Transvaal and Kroonstad in the Orange Free State. East London and Port Elizabeth each received four, the latter being allocated engine numbers 1544, 1545, 2125 and 2129 for use on the fast Saturday morning passenger trains to Cape Town.

The Classes 12A and 12AR versions both proved to be very successful engines which performed well, with low repair costs. Modifications in design of details after entering service were negligible.

=== Industrial service ===
None of the SAR Class 12A or Class 12AR locomotives were sold into industrial service, but between 1947 and 1953 eight Class 12A locomotives, similar to the unreboilered SAR locomotives but without superheaters, were built new for industrial service by NBL.

== Works numbers ==
The builders, years built, works numbers, reboilering particulars and original tender types are listed in the table.

Class 12A 4-8-2 Builders, works numbers, class & original tender type
Builder	Year built	Works no.	SAR no.	Class	Tender type
NBL	1919	21738	1520	12AR	MP1
NBL	1919	21739	1521	12A	MP1
NBL	1919	21740	1522	12AR	MP1
NBL	1919	21741	1523	12AR	MP1
NBL	1919	21742	1524	12A	MP1
NBL	1919	21743	1525	12A	MP1
NBL	1919	21744	1526	12A	MP1
NBL	1919	21745	1527	12A	MP1
NBL	1919	21746	1528	12A	MP1
NBL	1919	21747	1529	12AR	MP1
NBL	1919	21748	1530	12AR	MP1
NBL	1919	21749	1531	12A	MP1
NBL	1919	21750	1532	12AR	MP1
NBL	1919	21751	1533	12A	MP1
NBL	1919	21752	1534	12AR	MP1
NBL	1919	21753	1535	12AR	MP1
NBL	1919	21754	1536	12AR	MP1
NBL	1919	21755	1537	12AR	MP1
NBL	1919	21756	1538	12A	MP1
NBL	1919	21757	1539	12A	MP1
Henschel	1928	21046	1540	12AR	MT
Henschel	1928	21047	1541	12AR	MT
Henschel	1928	21048	1542	12AR	MT
Henschel	1928	21049	1543	12AR	MT
Henschel	1928	21050	1544	12AR	MT
Henschel	1928	21051	1545	12AR	MT
Henschel	1929	21428	1546	12AR	MT
Henschel	1929	21429	1547	12A	MT
Henschel	1929	21430	1548	12A	MT
Henschel	1929	21431	1549	12AR	MT
Henschel	1929	21432	1550	12AR	MT
Henschel	1929	21433	2103	12AR	MT
Henschel	1929	21434	2104	12AR	MT
Henschel	1929	21435	2105	12AR	MT
Henschel	1929	21436	2106	12A	MT
Henschel	1929	21437	2107	12A	MT
Henschel	1929	21438	2108	12AR	MT
Henschel	1929	21439	2109	12AR	MT
Henschel	1929	21440	2110	12AR	MT
NBL	1921	22751	2111	12A	MP1
NBL	1921	22752	2112	12AR	MP1
NBL	1921	22753	2113	12AR	MP1
NBL	1921	22754	2114	12A	MP1
NBL	1921	22755	2115	12AR	MP1
NBL	1921	22756	2116	12AR	MP1
NBL	1921	22757	2117	12A	MP1
NBL	1921	22758	2118	12AR	MP1
NBL	1921	22759	2119	12AR	MP1
NBL	1921	22760	2120	12AR	MP1
NBL	1921	22761	2121	12AR	MP1
NBL	1921	22762	2122	12AR	MP1
NBL	1921	22763	2123	12A	MP1
NBL	1921	22764	2124	12AR	MP1
NBL	1921	22765	2125	12AR	MP1
NBL	1929	23891	2126	12A	MT
NBL	1929	23892	2127	12AR	MT
NBL	1929	23893	2128	12AR	MT
NBL	1929	23894	2129	12AR	MT
NBL	1929	23895	2130	12A	MT
NBL	1929	23896	2131	12AR	MT
NBL	1929	23897	2132	12AR	MT
NBL	1929	23898	2133	12A	MT
NBL	1929	23899	2134	12A	MT
NBL	1929	23900	2135	12AR	MT
NBL	1929	23901	2136	12AR	MT
NBL	1929	23902	2137	12AR	MT
NBL	1929	23903	2138	12A	MT

== Preservation ==
Class	Number	Works nmr	THF / Private	Leaselend / Owner	Current Location	Outside South Africa	?
12R	1865	BP 5994	Private		Kimberley Locomotive Depot		
12R	1947	BALDWIN 52754	THF	Reefsteamers	Germiston Locomotive Depot		
12R	1505	NBL 20176	THF	Umgeni Steam Railway	Kloofstation (Inchaga)		
12A	2111	NBL 22751	THF		Bloemfontein Locomotive Depot		
12AR	1535	NBL 21753	THF	Reefsteamers	Germiston Locomotive Depot		

== Illustration ==
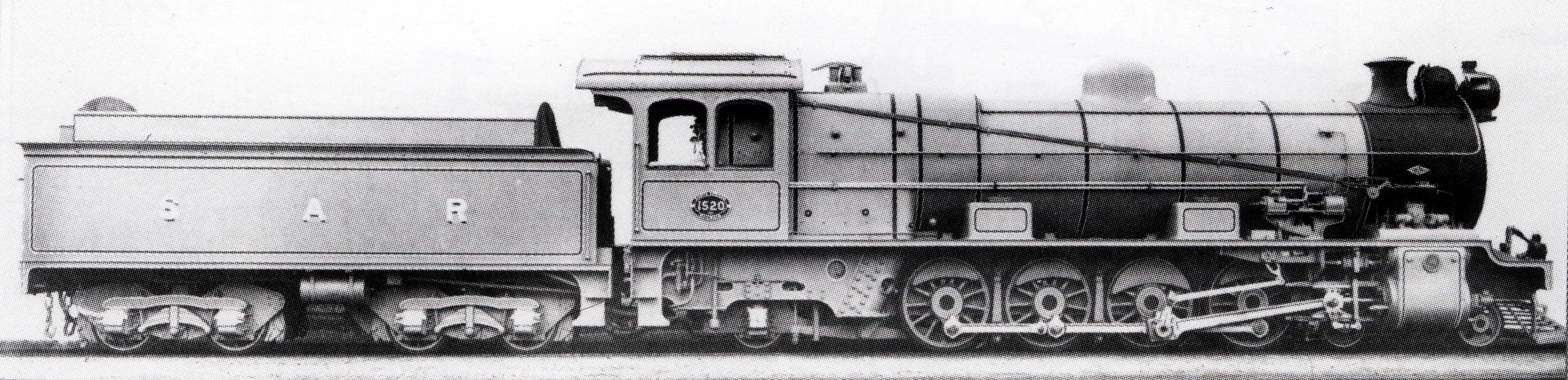
NBL builder's picture of no. 1520, 1st batch, with Type MP1 tender, c. 1919. Note the absence of a top-feed feedwater supply.

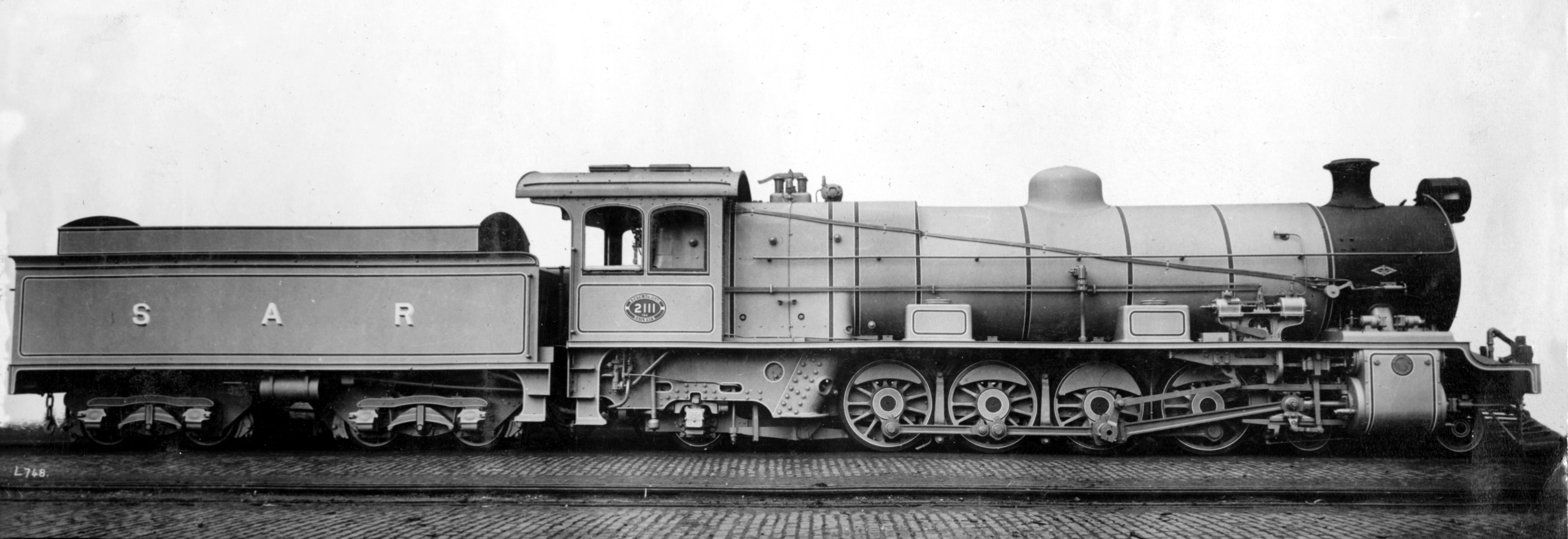
No. 2111, 2nd batch, with Ramsbottom safety valves and Type MP1 tender, c. 1921

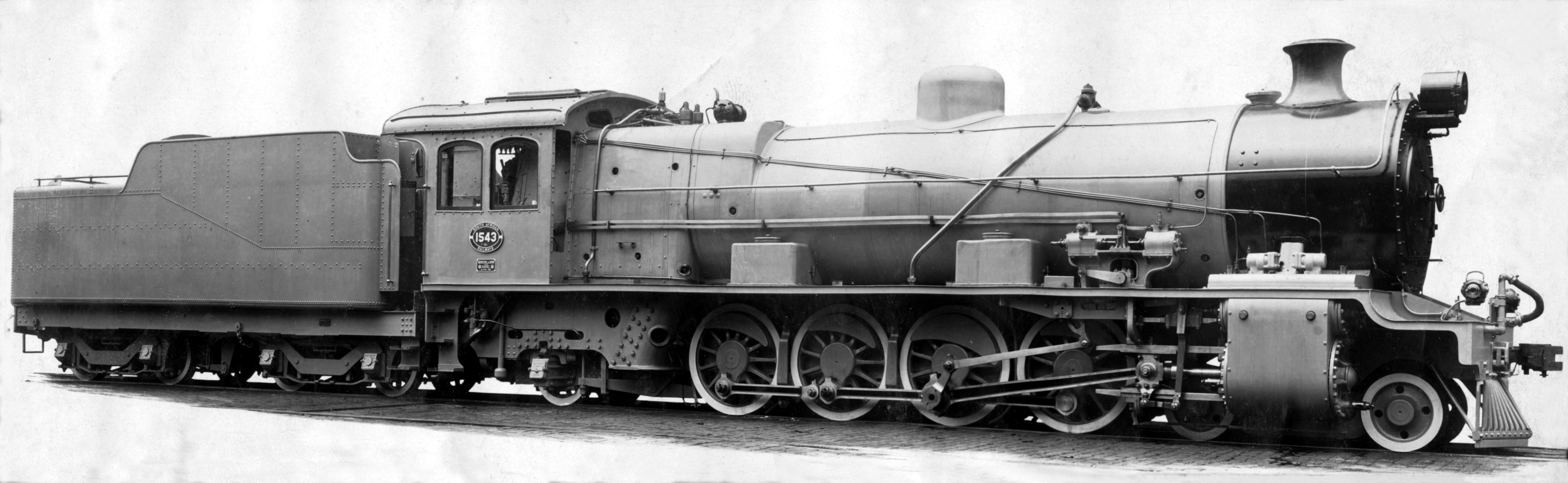
Henschel builder's picture of no. 1543, 3rd batch, with pop valves, top-feed feedwater supply and Type MT tender, c. 1928

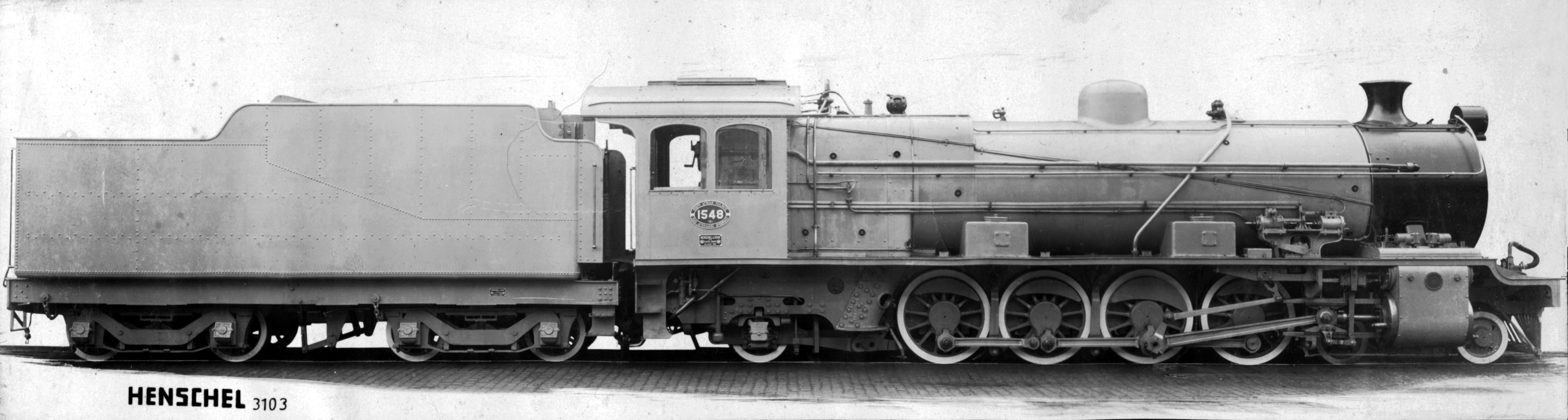
Henschel builder's picture of no. 1548, 4th batch, with pop valves and Type MT tender, c. 1929

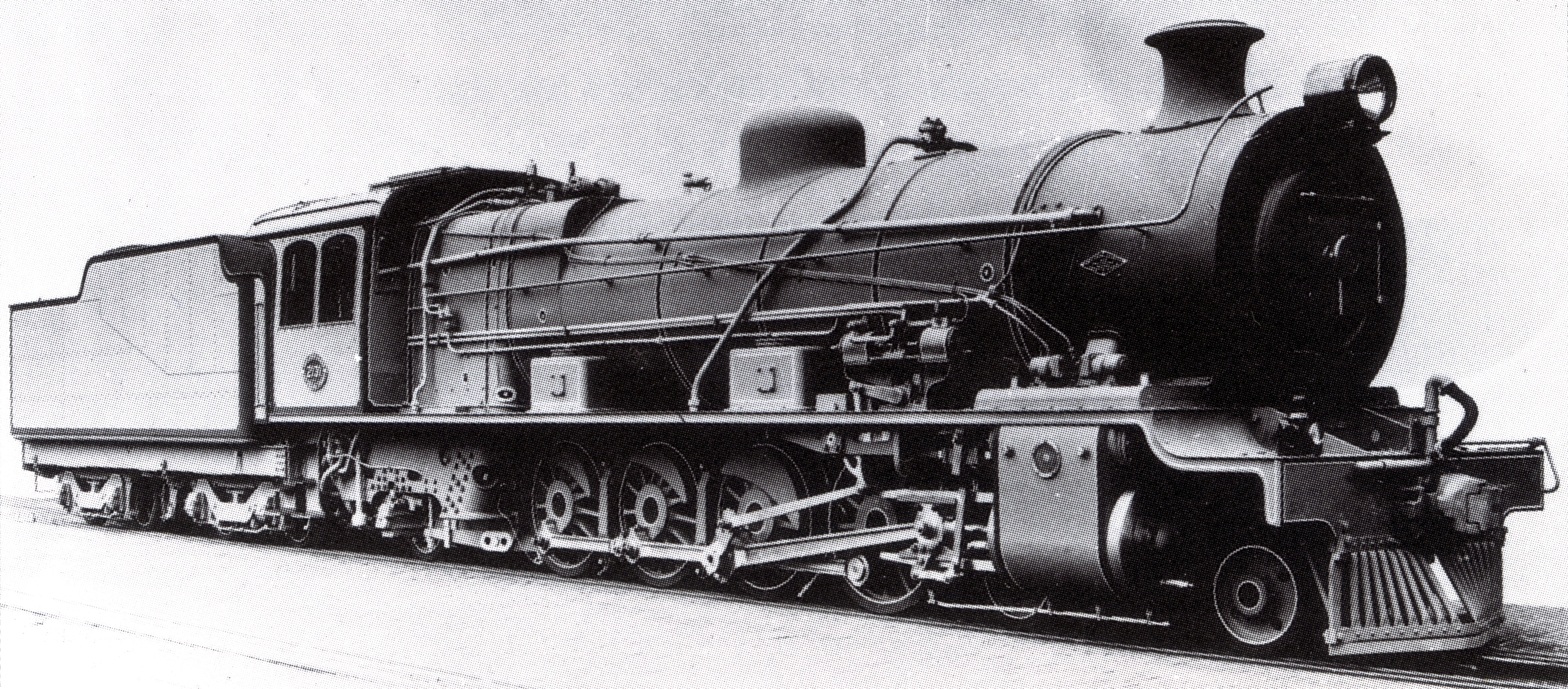
NBL builder's picture of no. 2131, 5th batch, with pop valves and Type MT tender, c. 1929

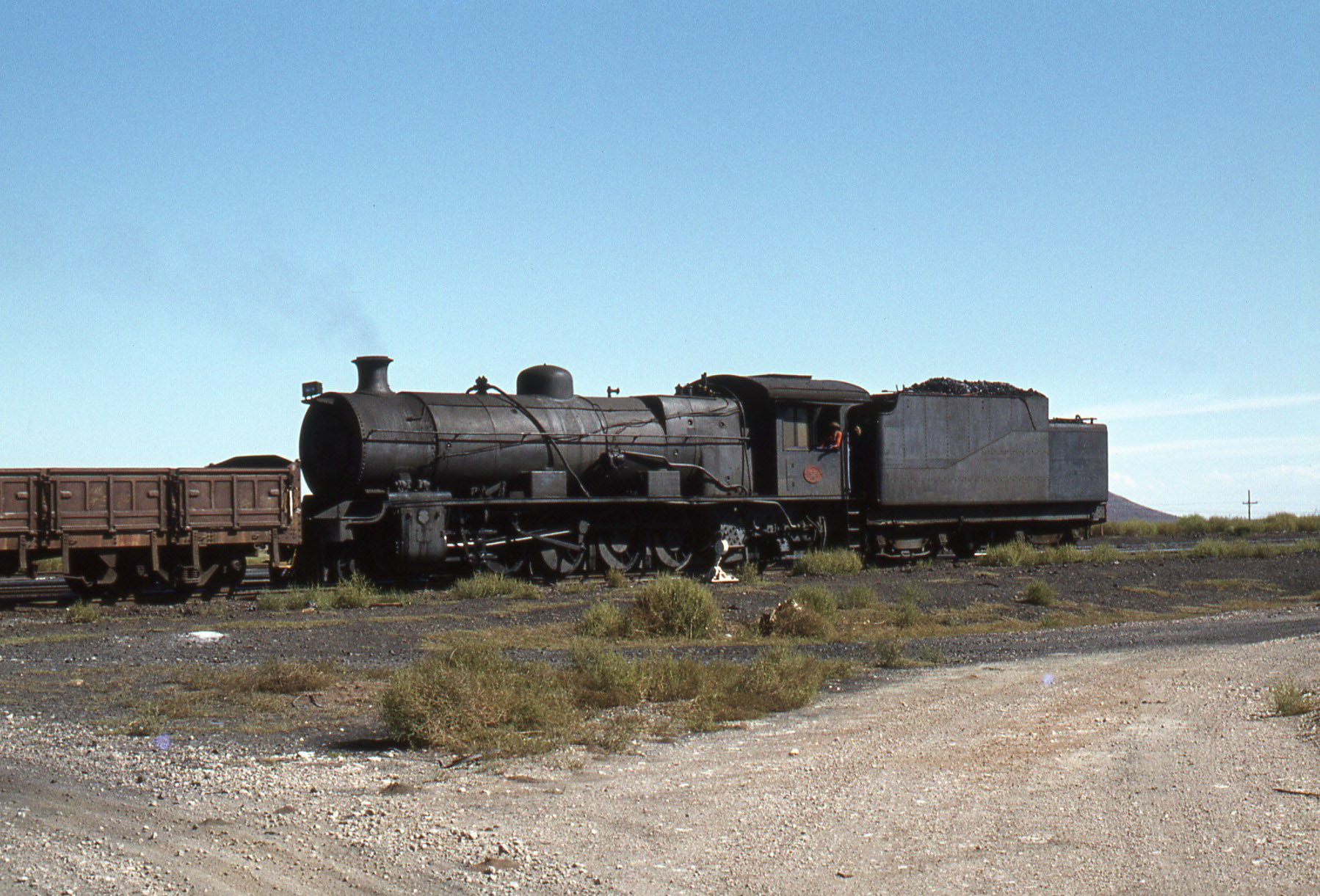
NBL-built 12A no. 1526 at De Aar, with Type MR tender, 6 April 1979

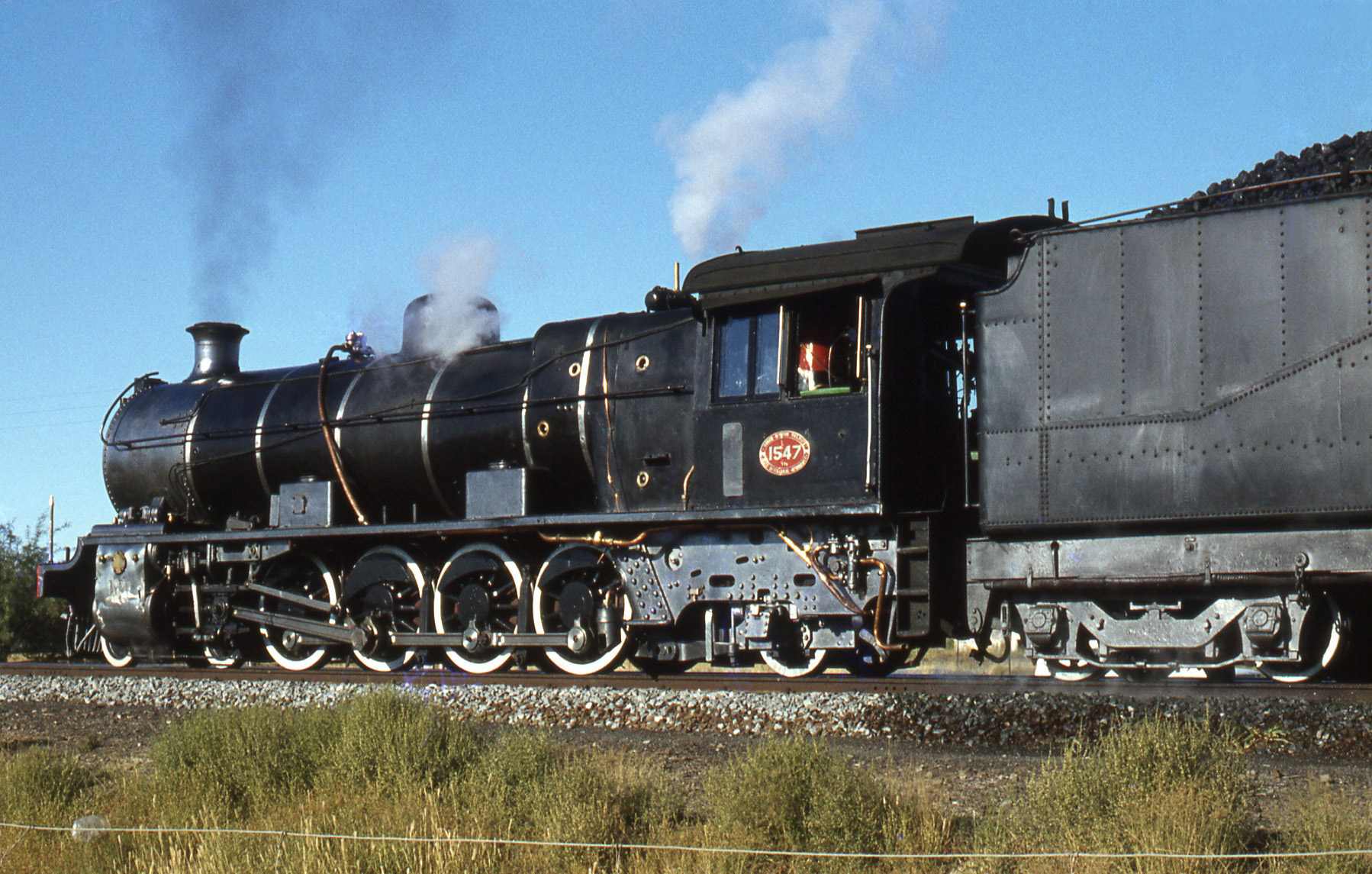
Henschel-built 12A no. 1547 at Visrivier, 14 April 1979

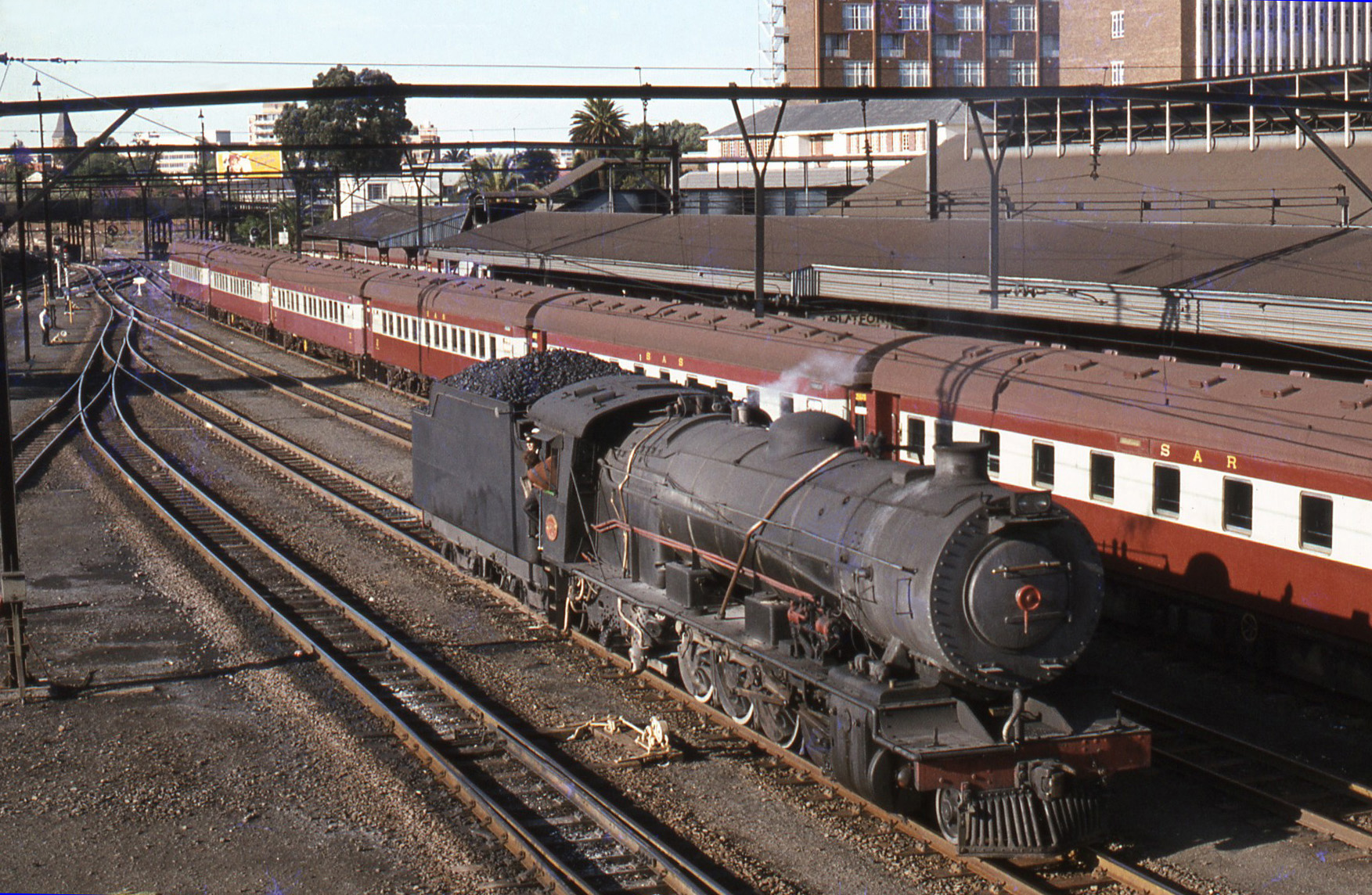
Henschel-built 12AR no. 1542 at Kimberley, 27 March 1983
