= South African Class 12R 4-8-2 =

South African Class 12R 4-8-2 may refer to one of the following steam locomotive classes that were reclassified to Class 12R after being reboilered with Watson Standard no. 2 boilers:

- South African Class 12 4-8-2
- South African Class 12B 4-8-2

== Gallery ==
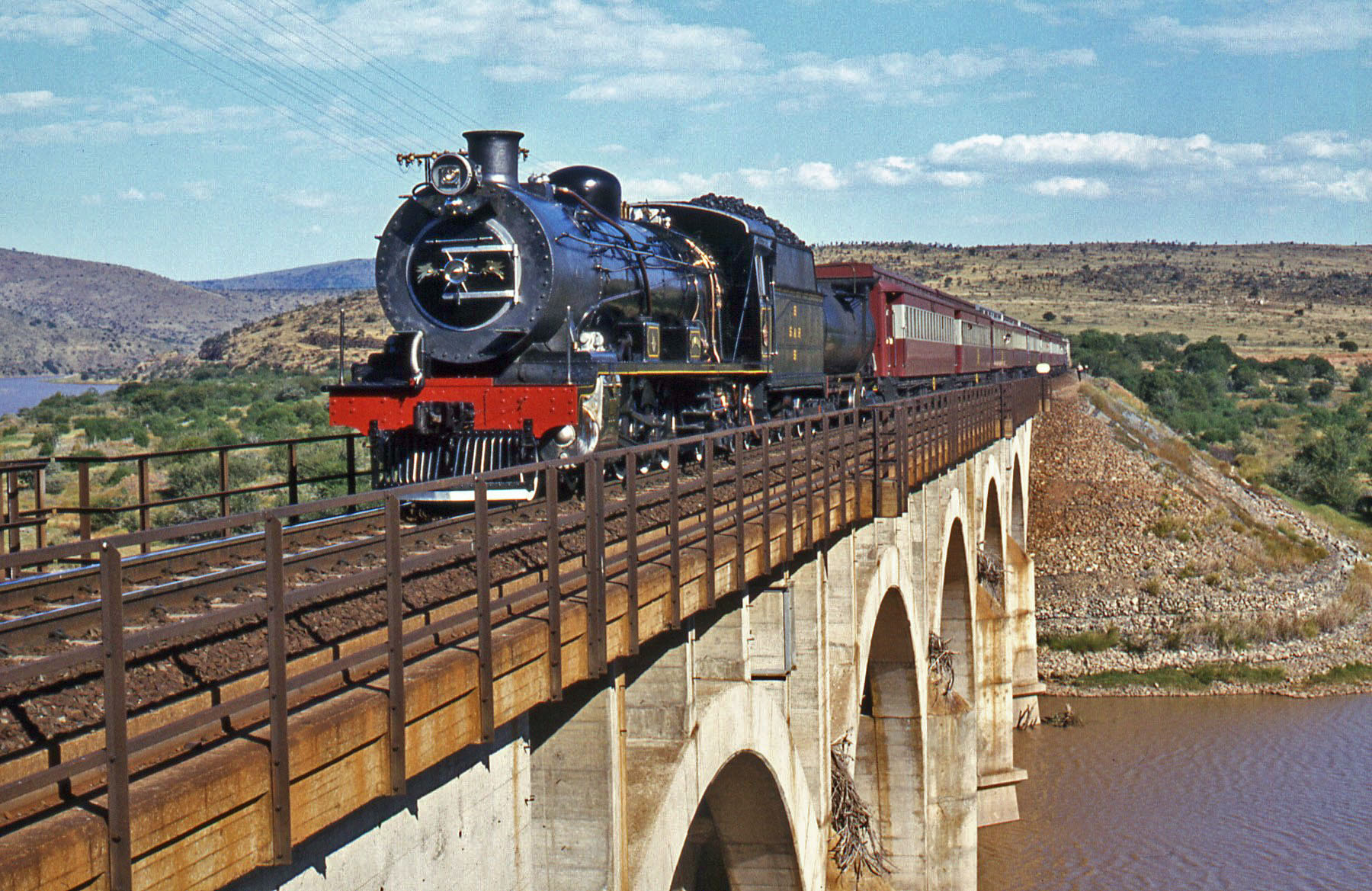
No. 1505 crossing the Great Fish River near Nelland, between Cradock and Cookhouse, 22 April 1981.

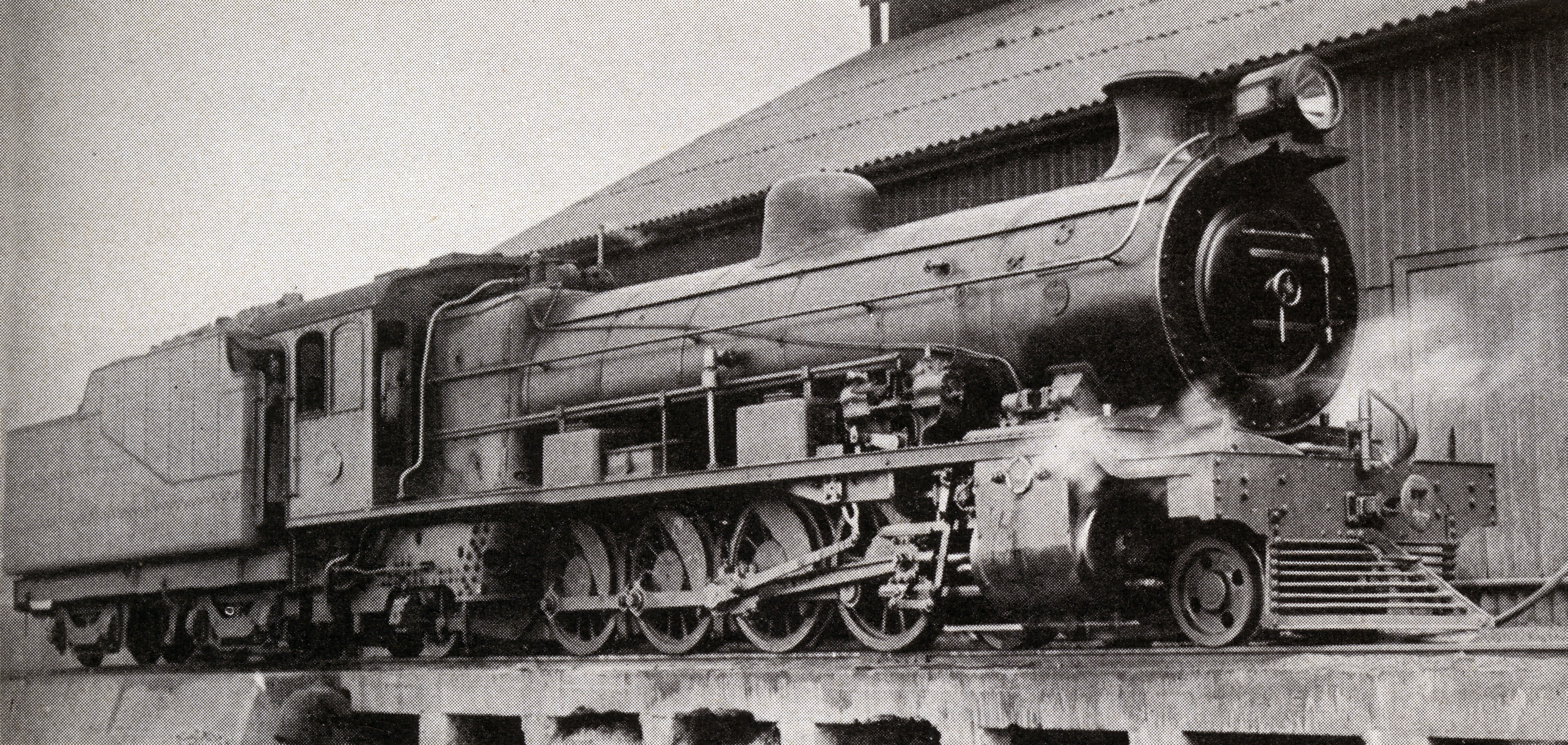
Class 12R no. 1931 at Port Elizabeth sheds, with Belpaire firebox, c. 1930.
