= South African type MR tender =

Steam locomotive tender in South Africa

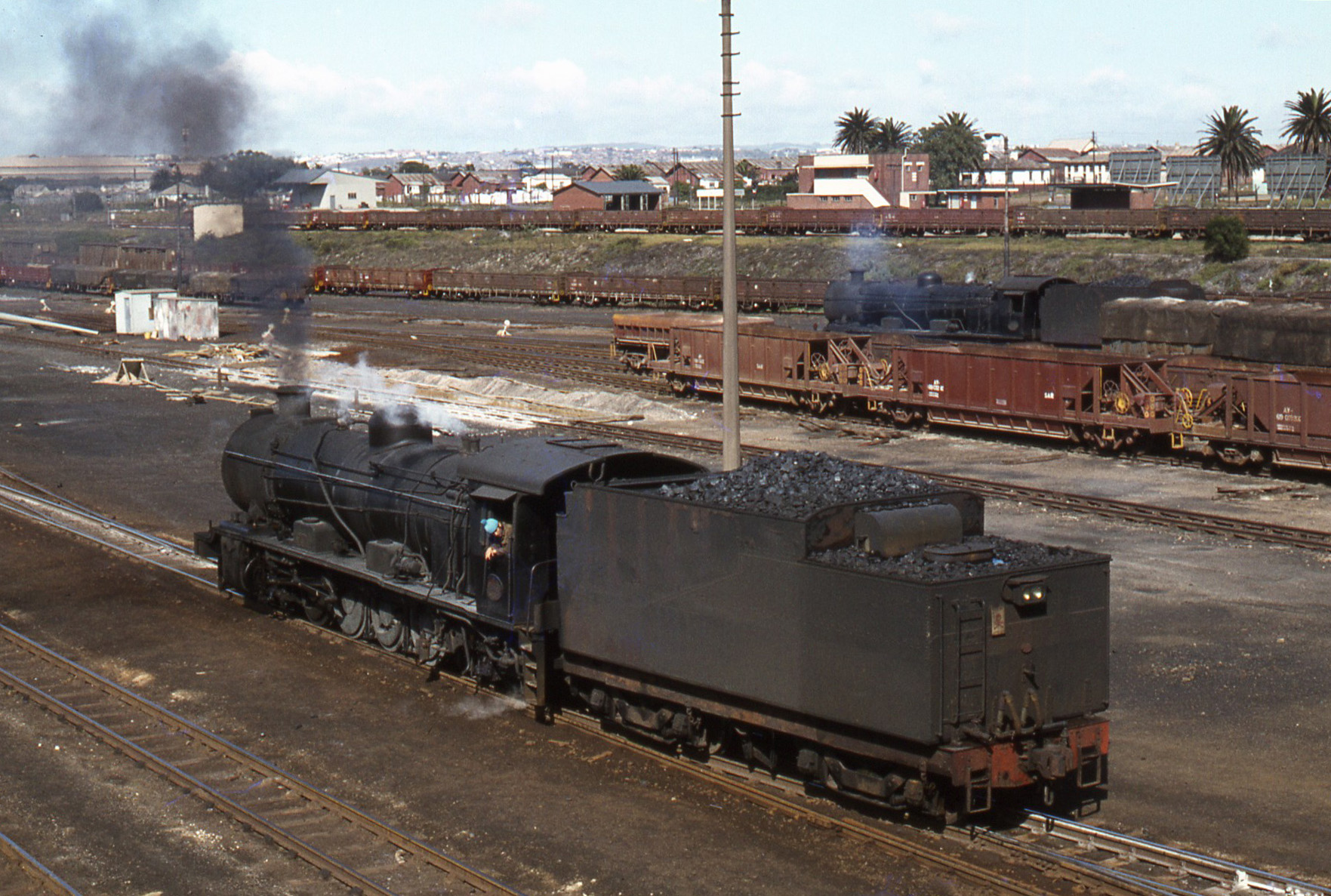
- Type MR on SAR Class 12R, 1979
Type and origin
- Locomotive: Class 12, Class 12A, Class 12B, Class 14A, Class 14B, Class 15, Class 15A, Class 16, Class 16A, Class 16B, Class 16C
- Designer: South African Railways
- Builder: South African Railways
- In service: c. 1930
- Rebuilt from: Type MP1
Specifications
- Configuration: 2-axle bogies
- Gauge: 3 ft 6 in (1,067 mm) Cape gauge
- Length: 25 ft 10 3/8 in (7,884 mm) no. 1494-1519, 1746-1760; 25 ft 10 3/4 in (7,893 mm) all others
- Wheel dia.: 34 in (864 mm)
- Wheelbase: 16 ft 9 in (5,105 mm)
  - Bogie: 4 ft 7 in (1,397 mm)
- Axle load: 13 LT 14 cwt (13,920 kg)
  - Front bogie: 24 LT 19 cwt (25,350 kg)
  - Rear bogie: 27 LT 8 cwt (27,840 kg)
- Weight empty: 48,864 lb (22,164 kg)
- Weight w/o: 52 LT 7 cwt (53,190 kg)
- Fuel type: Coal
- Fuel cap.: 10 LT (10.2 t)
- Water cap.: 4,600 imp gal (20,900 L)
- Stoking: Manual
- Couplers: Drawbar & AAR knuckle
Career
- Operators: South African Railways
- Numbers: SAR 790-841, 851-852, 1494-1550, 1561-1595, 1746-1760, 1781-1828, 1839-1878, 1901-1921, 1931-1970, 2011-2025, 2080-2100, 2103-2138

The South African type MR tender was a steam locomotive tender.

Type MR tenders were rebuilt from Type MP1 tenders, which had entered service between 1912 and 1920. The rebuilding resulted in a tender with a larger water tank, but the same coal capacity.

== Origin ==
The Type MP1 tender first entered service in 1912, as tenders to the Class 12 4-8-2 Mountain type steam locomotives which were acquired by the South African Railways (SAR) in that year. They were built by North British Locomotive Company and Beyer, Peacock & Company.

More Type MP1 tenders, from which the Type MR would later be rebuilt, entered service from 1913 to 1920 as tenders to the Classes 12A, 12B, 14A, 14B, 15, 15A, 16, 16A, 16B and 16C. These locomotives and tenders were built by Baldwin Locomotive Works, Beyer, Peacock & Company, Henschel & Son, JA Maffei and North British Locomotive Company.

Other locomotives which were delivered new with Type MP1 tenders were the Classes 14, MC1, MH and MJ.

== Rebuilding ==
During the 1930s, several of the Type MP1 tenders were rebuilt by the SAR by mounting a completely new upper structure with a larger water tank on the existing underframe. The modification was done to drawings approved by Chief Mechanical Engineer (CME) A.G. Watson in 1929 in respect of Type MP1 tenders of the Classes 12, 12A, 12B, 14, 14A, 14B, 15, 15A, 16, 16A, 16B and 16C. These rebuilt tenders had a more modern appearance, with flush sides all the way to the top of the self-trimming coal bunker.

The program to rebuild several older tender types with new upper structures was begun by Col F.R. Collins DSO, who approved several of the detailed drawings for the work during his term in office as CME of the SAR from 1922 to 1929.

== Characteristics ==
The rebuilt Type MR tender had the same 10 long tons (10.2 tonnes) coal capacity as the Type MP1, but its water capacity had been increased from 4,250 to 4,600 imperial gallons (19,300 to 20,900 litres). It had a maximum axle load of 13 long tons 14 hundredweight (13,920 kilograms).

== Classification letters ==
Since many tender types are interchangeable between different locomotive classes and types, a tender classification system was adopted by the SAR. The first letter of the tender type indicates the classes of engines to which it could be coupled. The "M_" tenders could be used with the locomotive classes as shown, although engine drawbars and intermediate emergency chains had to be replaced or adjusted to suit the target locomotive in some cases.

- Class 12, Class 12A and Class 12B.
- Class 14, Class 14A and Class 14B.
- Class 15 and Class 15A.
- Class 16, Class 16A, Class 16B and Class 16C.
- Class 19, Class 19A, Class 19B, Class 19C and Class 19D.
- Class 20.
- Class 24.
- Class MC1, Class MH and Class MJ.
- Class S2.

The second letter indicates the tender's water capacity. The "_R" tenders had a capacity of 4,600 imperial gallons (20,900 litres; 5,520 US gallons).

== Illustration ==
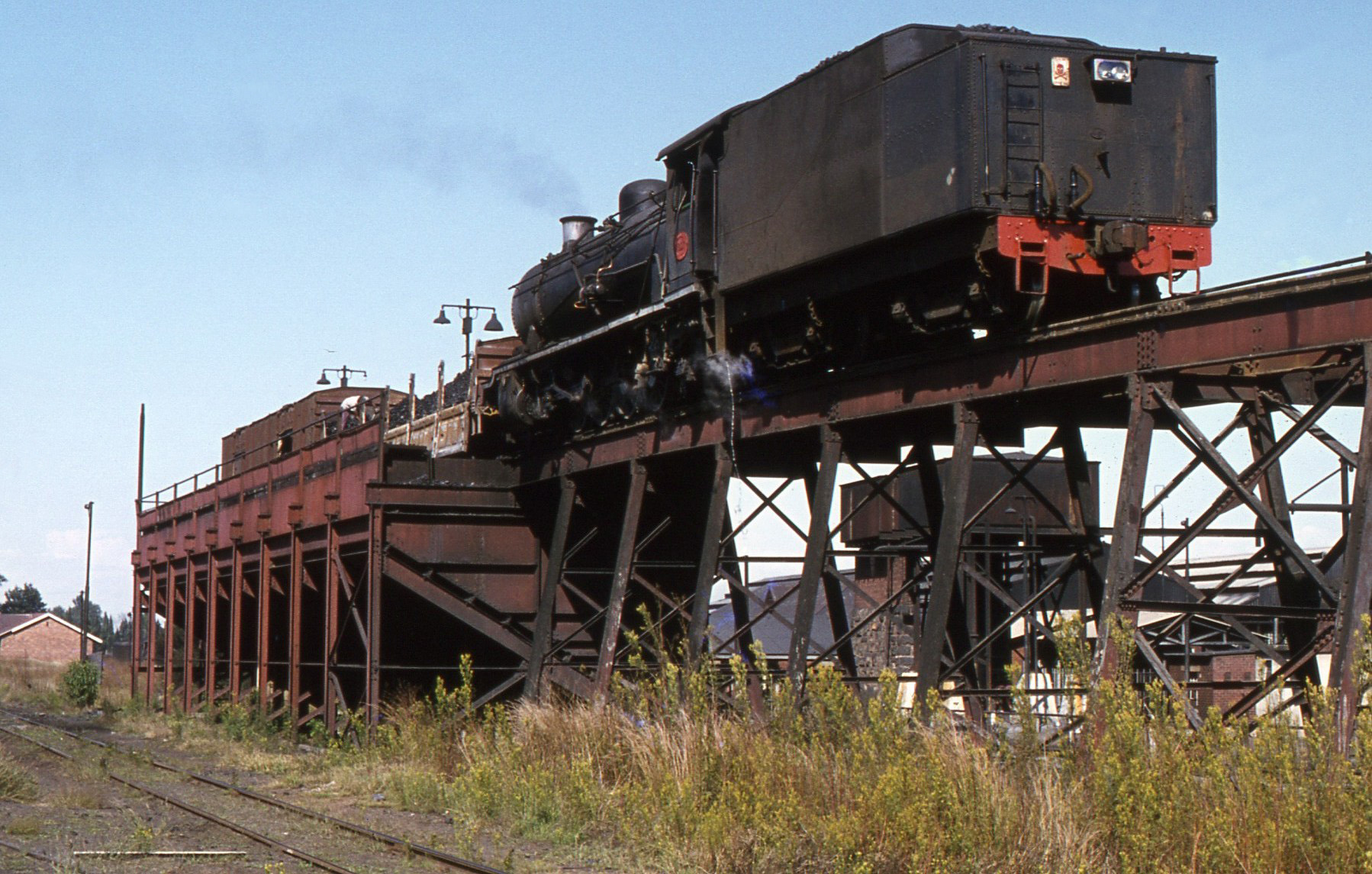
Type MR on SAR Class 14R, 1978
