= South African Class 14 4-8-2 =

1913 design of steam locomotive

South African Class 14 & 14R 4-8-2
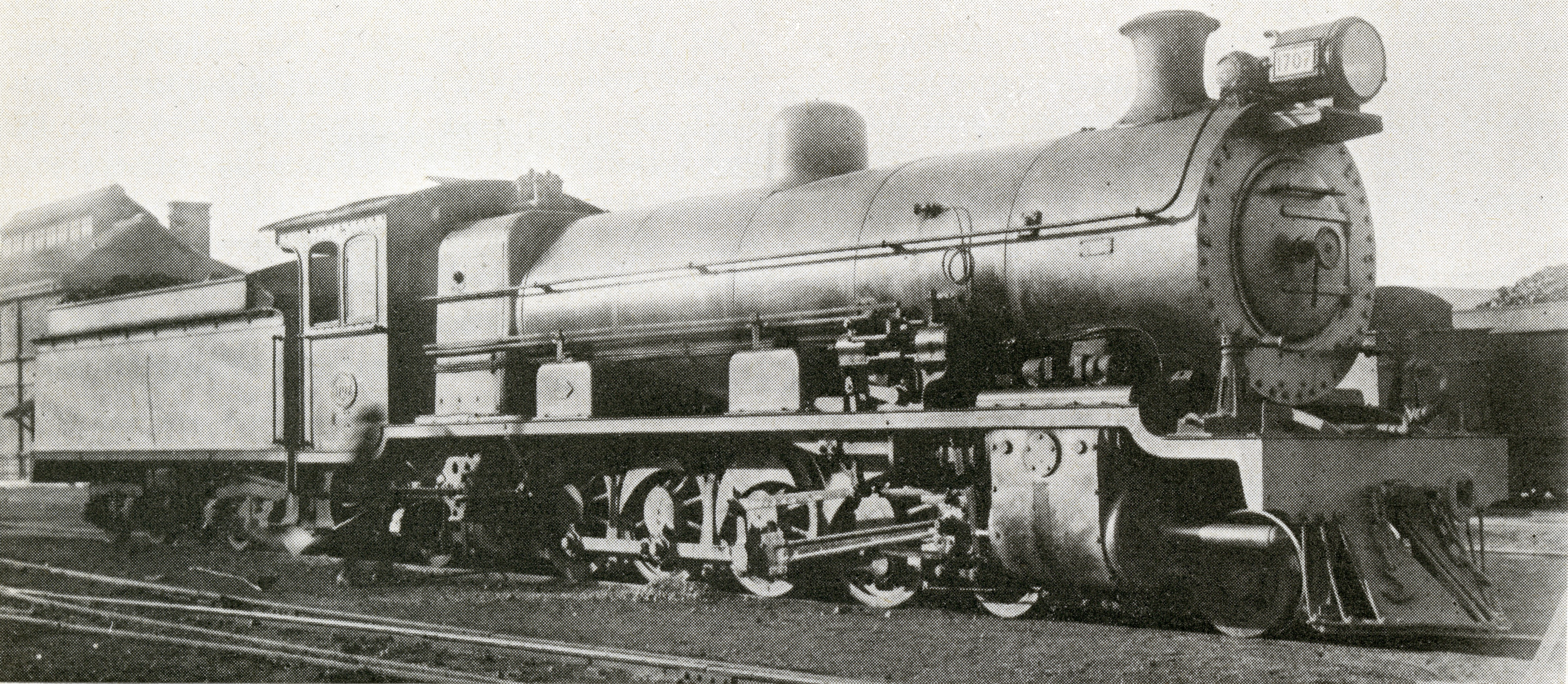
- No. 1707, as built, at Greyville Sheds, c. 1930
Type and origin
- ♠ Class 14 as built with a Belpaire firebox ♥ Class 14R rebuilt with a Watson Standard boiler ♣ Steel firebox - ♦ Copper firebox
- Power type: Steam
- Designer: South African Railways (D.A. Hendrie)
- Builder: Robert Stephenson and Company
- Serial number: 3543–3562, 3605–3614, 3630–3644
- Model: Class 14
- Build date: 1913–1915
- Total produced: 45
Specifications
- Configuration
  - Whyte: 4-8-2 (Mountain)
  - UIC: 2'D1'h2
- Driver: 2nd coupled axle
- Gauge: 3 ft 6 in (1,067 mm) Cape gauge
- Leading dia.: 28 1/2 in (724 mm)
- Coupled dia.: 48 in (1,219 mm)
- Trailing dia.: 33 in (838 mm)
- Tender wheels: 34 in (864 mm)
- Minimum curve: 300 ft (91 m)
- Wheelbase: 56 ft 11 3/8 in (17,358 mm)
  - Engine: 30 ft 7 in (9,322 mm)
  - Leading: 6 ft 2 in (1,880 mm)
  - Coupled: 12 ft 9 in (3,886 mm)
  - Tender: 16 ft 9 in (5,105 mm)
  - Tender bogie: 4 ft 7 in (1,397 mm)
- Length
  - Over couplers: 65 ft 3 1/2 in (19,901 mm)
- Height: ♠ 12 ft 7 1/2 in (3,848 mm) ♥ 12 ft 11 3/4 in (3,956 mm)
- Axle load: ♠ 16 LT 3 cwt (16,410 kg) ♥ 16 LT 10 cwt (16,760 kg)
  - Leading: ♠ 15 LT 14 cwt (15,950 kg) ♥ 15 LT 6 cwt (15,550 kg)
  - 1st coupled: ♠ 16 LT 1 cwt (16,310 kg) ♥ 15 LT 17 cwt (16,100 kg)
  - 2nd coupled: ♠ 16 LT 3 cwt (16,410 kg) ♥ 16 LT 10 cwt (16,760 kg)
  - 3rd coupled: ♠ 16 LT 3 cwt (16,410 kg) ♥ 15 LT 15 cwt (16,000 kg)
  - 4th coupled: ♠ 16 LT 1 cwt (16,310 kg) ♥ 15 LT 11 cwt (15,800 kg)
  - Trailing: ♠ 10 LT 14 cwt (10,870 kg) ♥ 11 LT 10 cwt (11,680 kg)
  - Tender bogie: Bogie 1: 27 LT 10 cwt (27,940 kg); Bogie 2: 23 LT 11 cwt (23,930 kg)
  - Tender axle: 13 LT 15 cwt (13,970 kg)
- Adhesive weight: ♠ 64 LT 8 cwt (65,430 kg) ♥ 63 LT 13 cwt (64,670 kg)
- Loco weight: ♠ 90 LT 16 cwt (92,260 kg) ♥ 90 LT 4 cwt (91,650 kg)
- Tender weight: 51 LT 1 cwt (51,870 kg)
- Total weight: ♠ 141 LT 17 cwt (144,100 kg) ♥ 141 LT 5 cwt (143,500 kg)
- Tender type: MP1 (2-axle bogies); MP, MP1, MR, MS, MT, MT1, MT2, MX, MY, MY1 permitted
- Fuel type: Coal
- Fuel capacity: 10 LT (10.2 t)
- Water cap.: 4,250 imp gal (19,300 L)
- Generator: Pyle National turbo
- Firebox
  - Type: ♠ Belpaire - ♥ Round-top
  - Grate area: ♠♥ 37 sq ft (3.4 m^{2})
- Boiler
  - Model: Watson Standard no. 2
  - Pitch: ♠ 7 ft 7 in (2,311 mm) ♥ 8 ft 1/2 in (2,451 mm)
  - Diameter: ♠♥ 5 ft 7 1/2 in (1,714 mm)
  - Tube plates: ♠ 19 ft (5,791 mm) ♥♣ 19 ft 4 in (5,893 mm) ♥♦ 19 ft 3 5/8 in (5,883 mm)
  - Small tubes: ♠ 139: 2 1/4 in (57 mm) ♥ 87: 2 1/2 in (64 mm)
  - Large tubes: ♠ 24: 5 1/2 in (140 mm) ♥ 30: 5 1/2 in (140 mm)
- Boiler pressure: ♠♥ 190 psi (1,310 kPa)
- Safety valve: ♠ Ramsbottom - ♥ Pop
- Heating surface
  - Firebox: ♠ 150 sq ft (14 m^{2}) ♥ 142 sq ft (13.2 m^{2})
  - Tubes: ♠ 2,212 sq ft (205.5 m^{2}) ♥ 1,933 sq ft (179.6 m^{2})
  - Total surface: ♠ 2,362 sq ft (219.4 m^{2}) ♥ 2,075 sq ft (192.8 m^{2})
- Superheater
  - Heating area: ♠ 540 sq ft (50 m^{2}) ♥ 492 sq ft (45.7 m^{2})
- Cylinders: Two
- Cylinder size: 22 in (559 mm) bore 26 in (660 mm) stroke
- Valve gear: Walschaerts
- Valve type: Piston
- Couplers: Johnston link-and-pin AAR knuckle (1930s)
Performance figures
- Tractive effort: ♠♥ 37,360 lbf (166.2 kN) @ 75%
Career
- Operators: South African Railways
- Class: Classes 14 & 14R
- Number in class: 45
- Numbers: 1701-1745
- Delivered: 1913-1915
- First run: 1913
- Withdrawn: 1982
- The leading coupled axle had flangeless wheels

The South African Railways Class 14 4-8-2 of 1913 was a steam locomotive.

Between 1913 and 1915, the South African Railways placed 45 Class 14 steam locomotives with a 4-8-2 Mountain type wheel arrangement in service in Natal.

== Manufacturer ==
The Class 14 locomotive was a development of the Class 12 and was similar enough to it that many components were interchangeable. It was ordered from Robert Stephenson and Company in 1913 and was delivered in three batches between 1913 and 1915, numbered in the range from 1701 to 1745.

== Characteristics ==
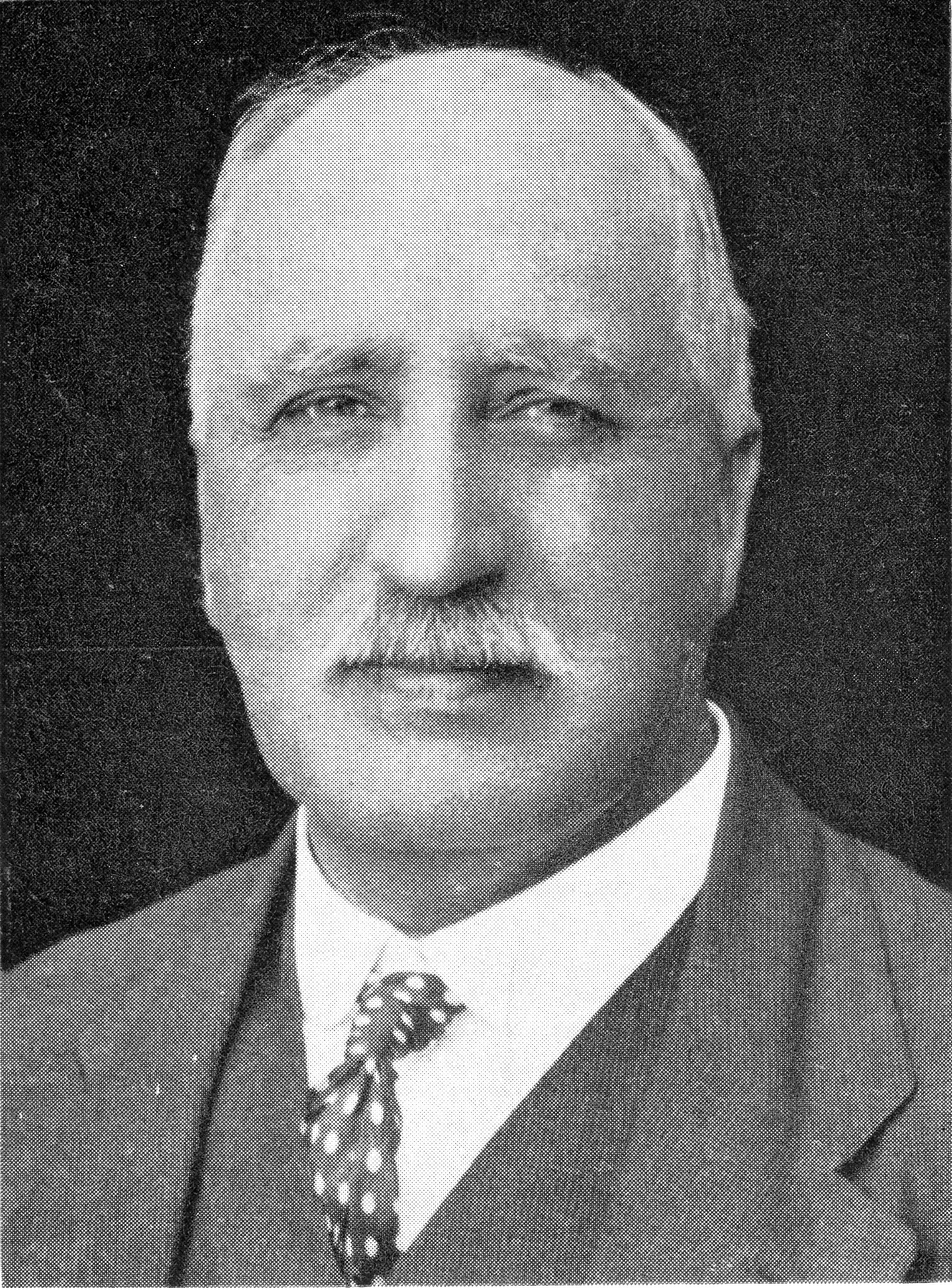
D.A. Hendrie

At the time the Class 14 was designed by D.A. Hendrie, Chief Mechanical Engineer (CME) of the South African Railways (SAR), it was believed that small differences in wheel diameter had disproportionate effects on performance. The SAR already had the Class 3B Mountain type with 45 inches (1,143 millimetres) diameter coupled wheels and the Class 12 Mountain type with 51 inches (1,295 millimetres) diameter coupled wheels, but for the 300 feet (91 metres) radius curves and 1 in 30 (3⅓%) compensated gradients of the Natal mainline, the Class 14 with 48 inches (1,219 millimetres) diameter coupled wheels was designed as an intermediate-sized locomotive.

Steam locomotives were shipped in a dismantled state and erected at one of the SAR Shops. They were then steam-tested and painted before being released into traffic. Upon delivery, the Class 14 locomotives could not be erected departmentally owing to the congestion of work in the Durban workshops. The assembly work was therefore contracted to Messrs. James Brown and Company of Congella.

The Class 14 had Walschaerts valve gear and a Belpaire firebox and was superheated. It was delivered with Type MP1 tenders, which had a coal capacity of 10 long tons (10.2 tonnes) and a water capacity of 4,250 imperial gallons (19,300 litres). Apart from the differences in their coupled wheel diameters, the Class 14 was a better locomotive with a more modern cylinder design, having straighter ports and a larger steam chest volume than the other two classes.

A feature in the design of the leading bogie was that the bogie frame was a single steel casting to which the cast steel horns were bolted to take the axle boxes. An innovation was the arrangement of the laminated side control springs in combination with two point swing links, which would be part of all Hendrie's subsequent designs. To prevent trouble which had been experienced earlier owing to the fracture of the smokebox saddle and frame stretcher castings which contained steam chest passages, and also leakage at exhaust joints, the blast pipe breeches were made separate castings and not integral with the centre stretcher casting.

The engines were fitted with Pyle National turbo-generators and headlamps, with the generator attached to the top of the smokebox, ahead of the chimney. It had the Hasler speed indicator, sight feed lubricators, Hendrie's steam reversing gear, steam operation for rocking the firegrate, Gresham and Craven injectors, steam brakes and combination vacuum ejectors.

== Watson Standard boilers ==
During the 1930s, many serving locomotives were reboilered with a standard boiler type designed by then CME A.G. Watson as part of his standardisation policy. Such Watson Standard reboilered locomotives were reclassified by adding an "R" suffix to their classification.

From 1935, all the Class 14 locomotives were reboilered with Watson Standard no. 2 boilers and reclassified to Class 14R. In the process, the engines were also equipped with Watson cabs with their distinctive slanted fronts, compared to the conventional vertical fronts of the original cabs. Only slight modifications were found necessary to take the new boilers, such as a cast packer under the smokebox saddle and a widening of the running board below the cab. The flangeless leading coupled wheels were flanged and Type MR tenders were attached to the reboilered engines.

Their original Belpaire boilers were fitted with Ramsbottom safety valves, while the Watson Standard boiler was fitted with Pop safety valves. An obvious difference between an original and a Watson Standard reboilered locomotive is usually a rectangular regulator cover, just to the rear of the chimney on the reboilered locomotive. In the case of the Class 14 locomotives, two even more obvious differences are the Watson cab and the absence of the Belpaire firebox hump between the cab and boiler on the reboilered locomotives.

== Service ==
=== South African Railways ===
The locomotives were placed in service on the mainline between Durban and Ladysmith in Natal. With the gradual further electrification of the Natal mainline in the later 1920s, they were eventually left to operate on the old mainline route via Botha's Hill until that line was also electrified. Most of them were then allocated to Empangeni in the north and Port Shepstone in the south.

These were the most numerous, useful and ubiquitous class of steam locomotive to see service in Natal. They all gave more than 60 years of service, of which more than half was on the Natal mainline, originally as Class 14 on the mainline and later as Class 14R on all sorts of mixed traffic work on secondary lines. In 1976, many were transferred to the Witwatersrand for shunting service. By 1983, they were all withdrawn from service.

=== International ===
As a result of the collapse of railways during the civil war in Mozambique in the late 1970s, Class 14R locomotives became the mainstay of locomotive power in Swaziland until they were eventually replaced there by Class 15AR locomotives.

Similarly, while Zimbabwe was rebuilding its Garratt fleet, Class 14R locomotives were hired for shunting service to release Garratt locomotives for mainline work.

+ 1703 Hired to Rhodesia/Zimbabwe 04/1981 to 03/1982

+ 1706 Hired to Rhodesia/Zimbabwe 04/1981 to 03/1982

+ 1707 Hired to Rhodesia/Zimbabwe 06/1981 to 10/1982

+ 1709 Hired to Rhodesia/Zimbabwe 07/1981 to 10/1982

+ 1712 Hired to Rhodesia/Zimbabwe 04/1981 to 11/1982

+ 1715 Hired to Rhodesia/Zimbabwe 10/1981 to 08/1982

+ 1725 Hired to Rhodesia/Zimbabwe 09/1981 to 08/1982

+ 1728 Hired to Rhodesia/Zimbabwe 10/1981 to 11/1982

+ 1731 Hired to Rhodesia/Zimbabwe 02/1981 to 10/1982

+ 1733 Hired to Rhodesia/Zimbabwe 07/1981 to 04/1982

+ 1745 Hired to Rhodesia/Zimbabwe 09/1981 to 10/1982

=== Industry ===
Thirteen Class 14R locomotives were eventually sold into industrial service:

- No. 1701 became Apex Colliery no. 5 at Greenside.
- Numbers 1705 and 1737 respectively became Grootvlei Proprietary Mines no. 5 Joyce and no. 4. No. 4 was later renumbered to no. 6 Graham.
- Numbers 1711, 1714, 1719, 1732 and 1735 went to Rustenburg Platinum Mines, retaining their SAR numbers.
- Numbers 1723 and 1745 went to Natal Cambrian Colliery at Ballangeiech as no. 1 and 2 respectively.
- No. 1729 went to the Vaal Reefs Gold Mine.
- No. 1730 became Randfontein Estates Gold Mine no. 5.
- No. 1740 went to Newcastle Platberg Colliery and later to Ballangeiech Colliery.

== Preservation ==
| Number | Works nmr | THF / Private | Leaselend / Owner | Current Location | Outside South Africa | ? |
|---|---|---|---|---|---|---|
| 1576 | | Private | Umgeni Steam Railway | Kloofstation (Inchanga) | | |
| 1701 | | Private | Greenside Colliery | Greenside Colliery | | |
| 1718 | | THF | | Bloemfontein Locomotive Depot | | |
| 1733 | | THF | | Krugersdorp Locomotive Depot | | |
| 1759 | | THF | | Bloemfontein Locomotive Depot | | |
| 1908 | | Private | Greenside Colliery | Greenside Colliery | | |

== Illustration ==
The main picture and the builder's picture show the Class 14 with its original Belpaire firebox, while the remainder are all of locomotives with Watson Standard boilers and round-topped fireboxes.

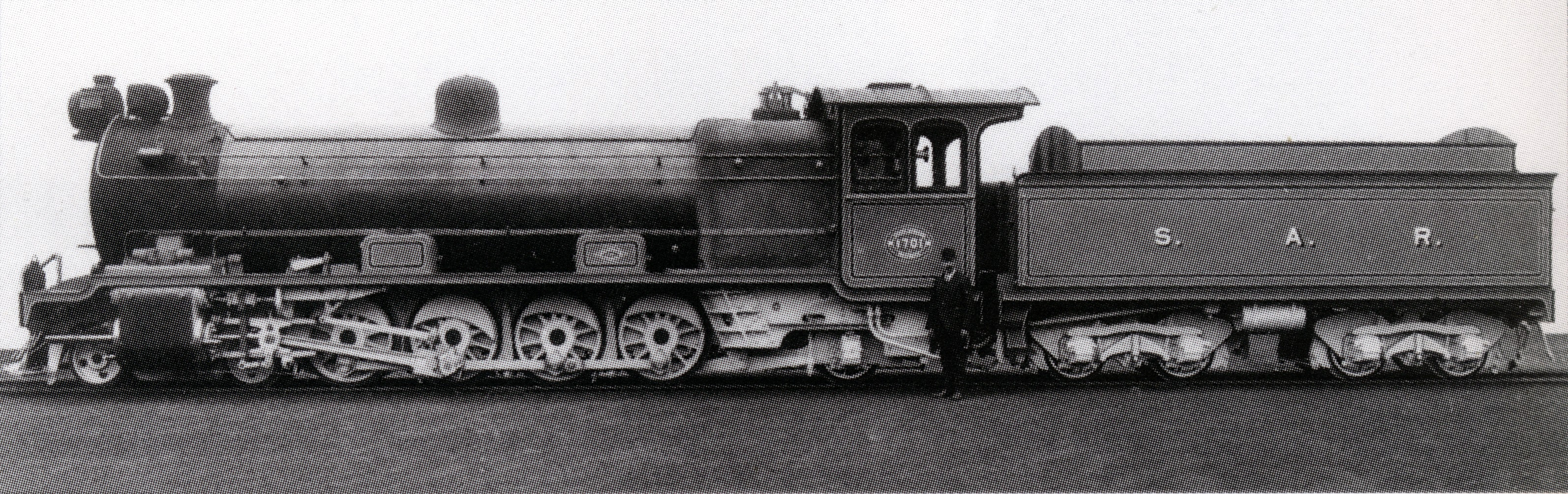
Builder's picture of no. 1701, c. 1913

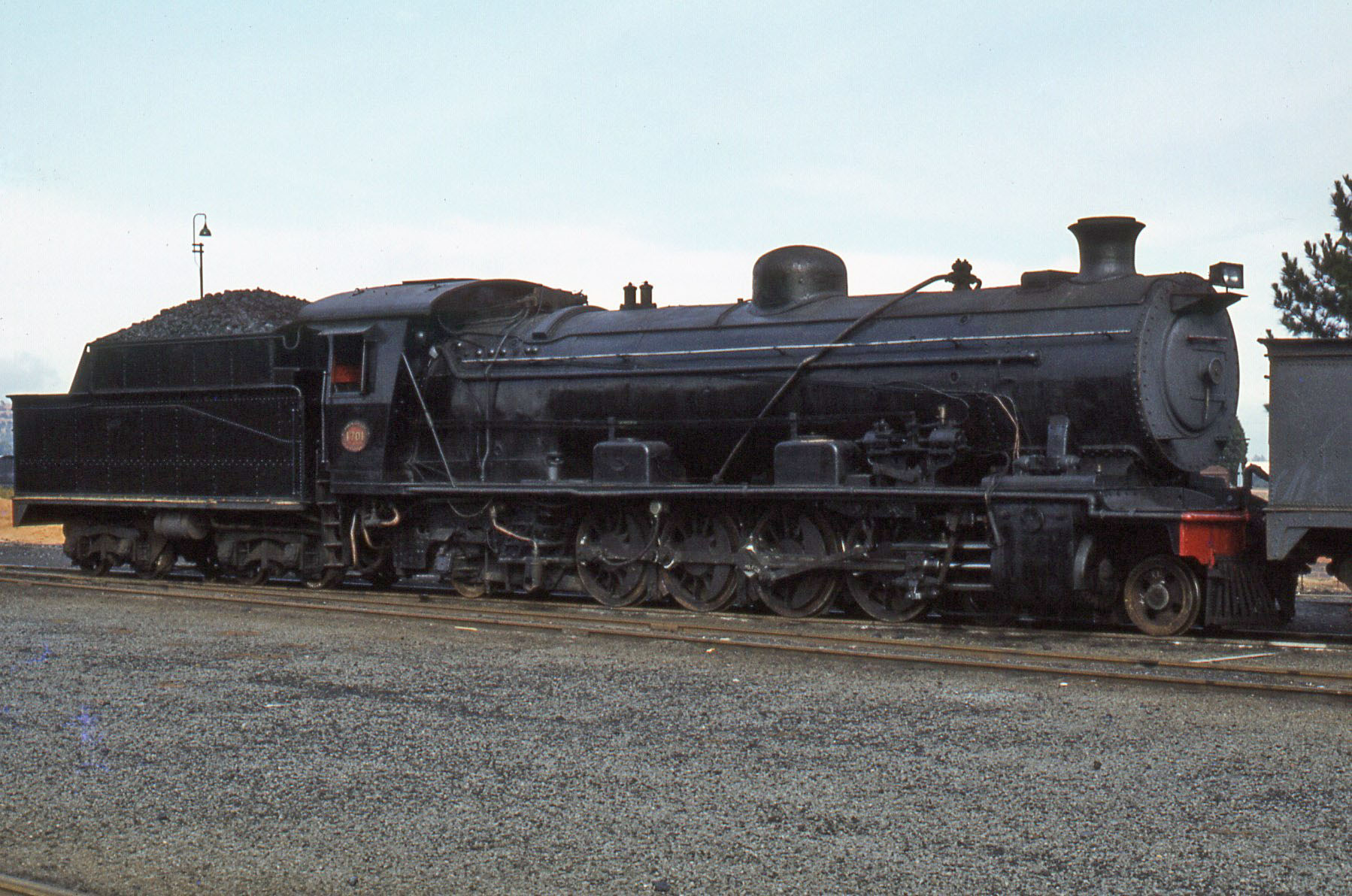
No. 1701 with a modified Type MP1 tender at Millsite, 1979

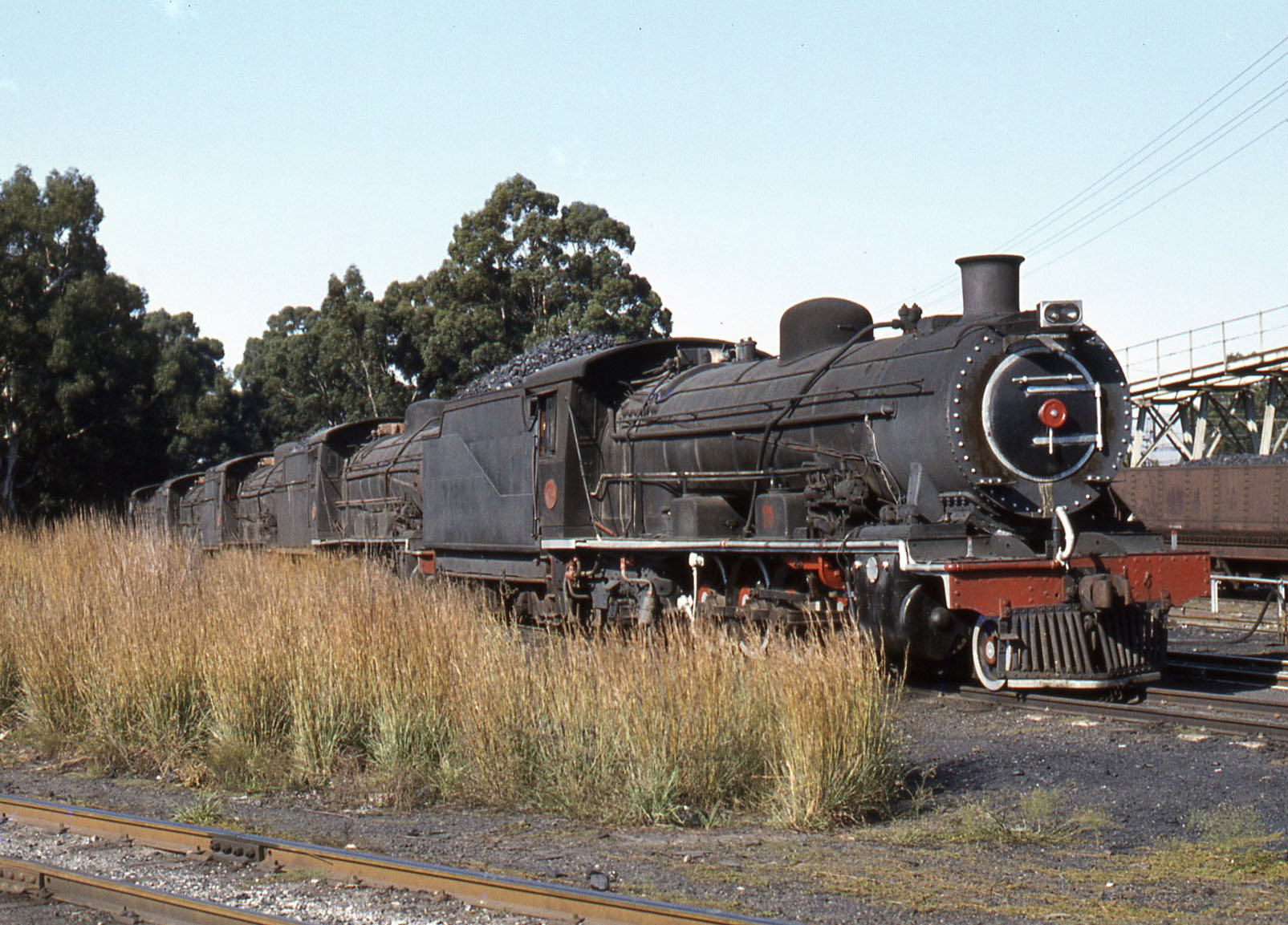
Second batch no. 1730 at Volksrust, 1979

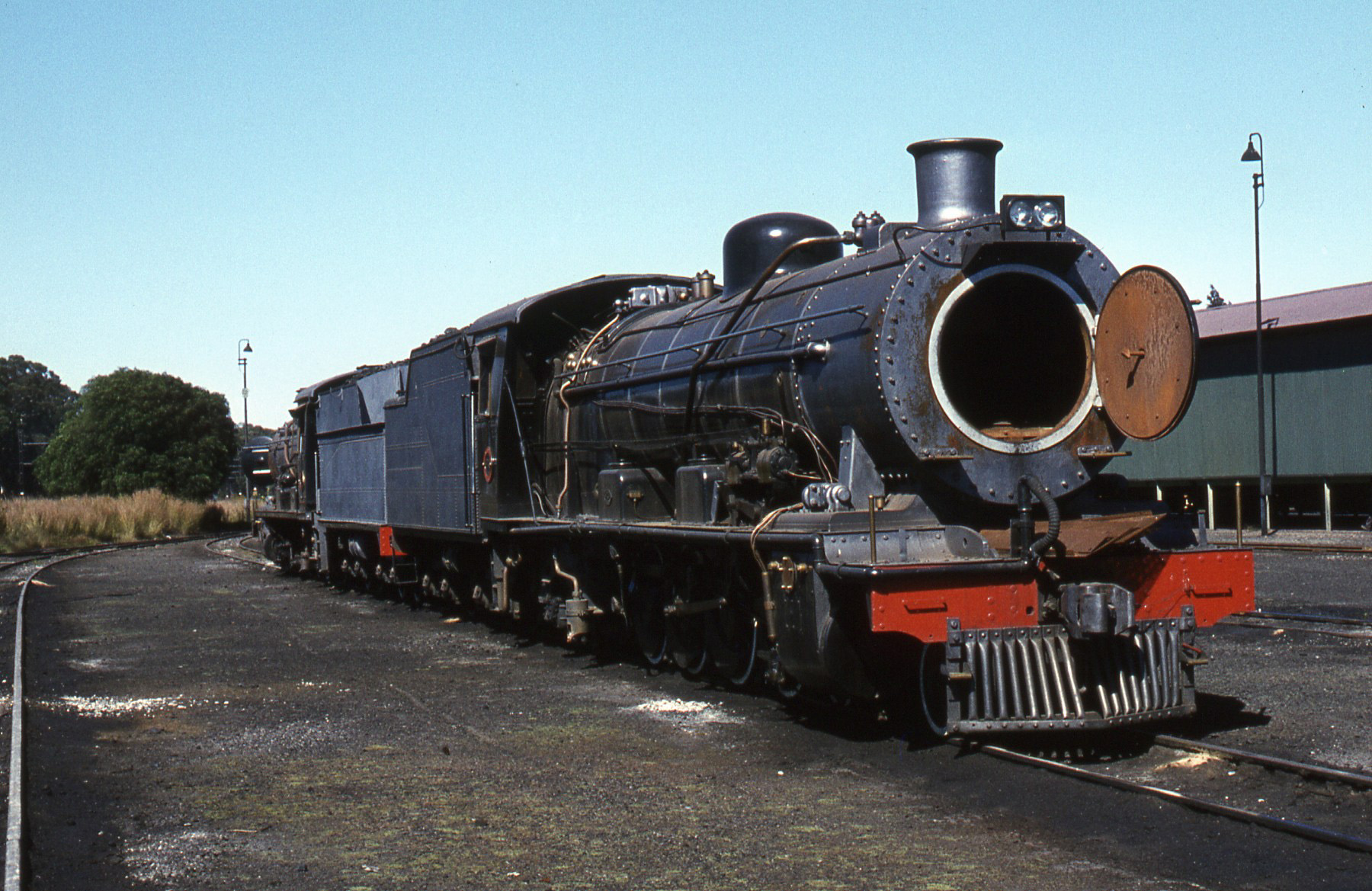
Last built no. 1745 at Millsite, Krugersdorp, 1981

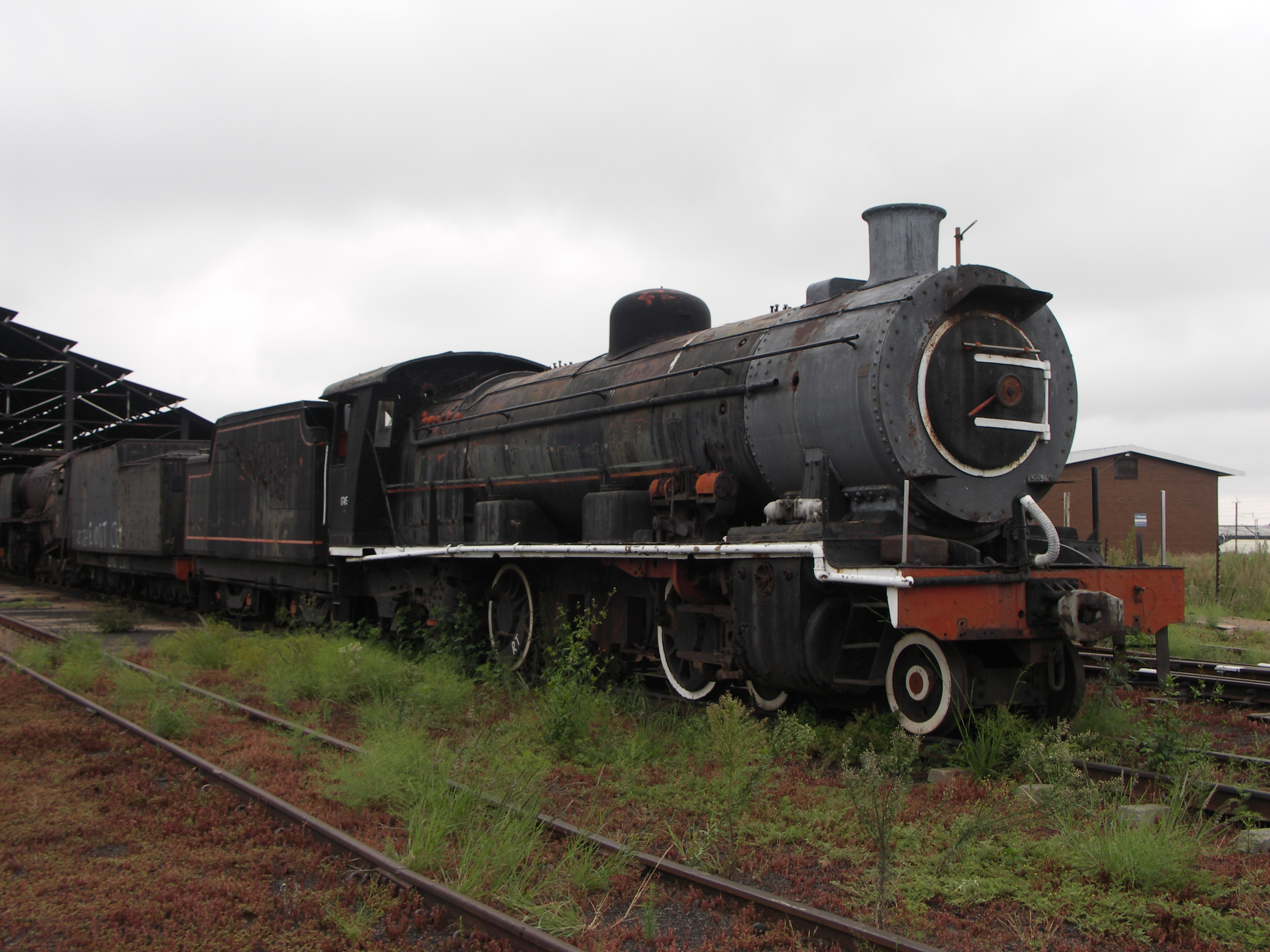
No. 1745, still staged at Millsite, 33 years later in 2014
