= South African Class 12 4-8-2 =

1912 design of steam locomotive

South African Class 12 & 12R 4-8-2
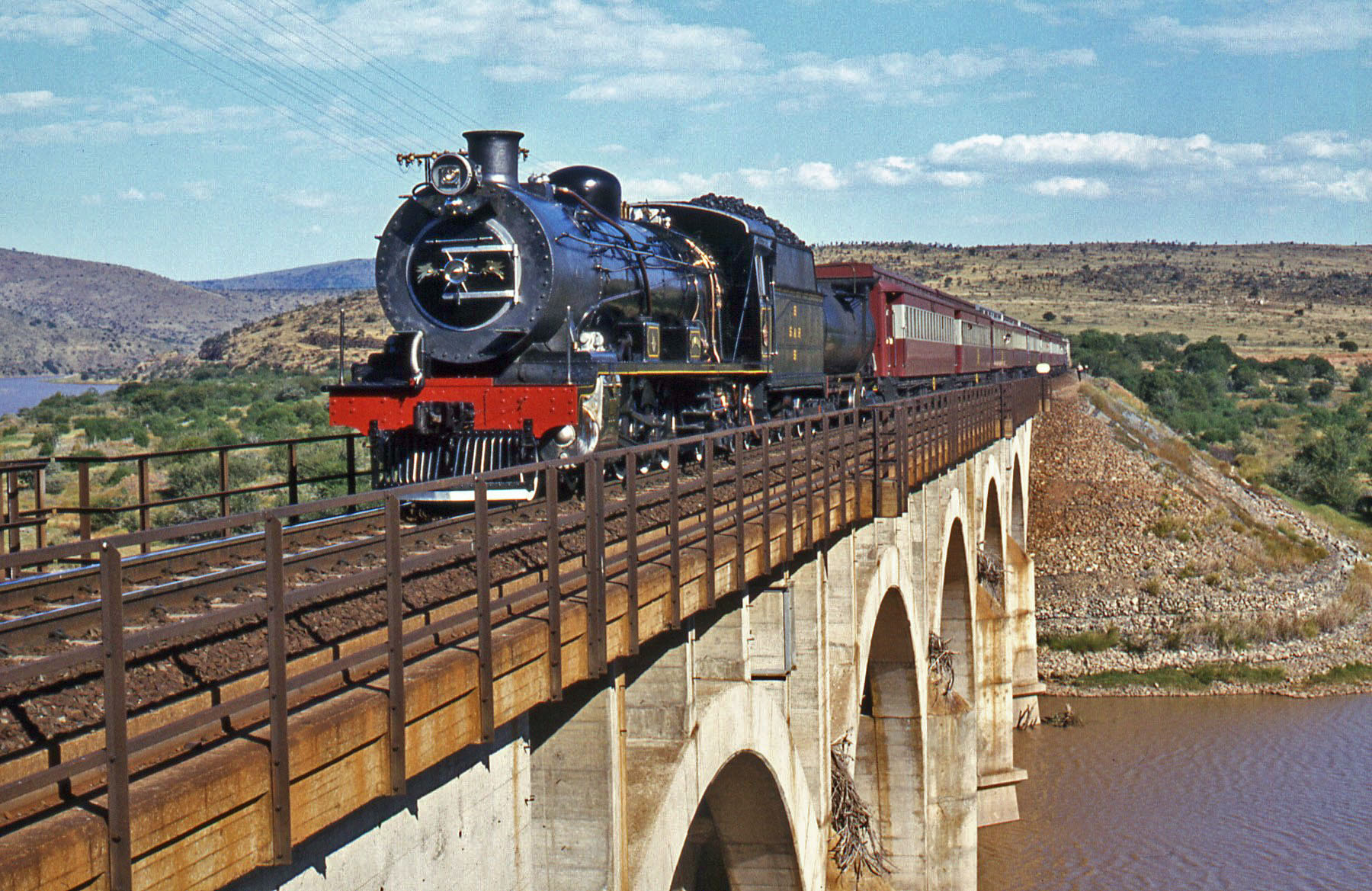
- 1505 crossing the Great Fish River near Nelland, between Cradock and Cookhouse, 22 April 1981
Type and origin
- ♠ Class 12 as built with a Belpaire firebox ♥ Class 12R rebuilt with a Watson Standard boiler ♣ Steel firebox – ♦ Copper firebox ʘ No. 1494-1501 – ʘ All others
- Power type: Steam
- Designer: South African Railways
- Builder: North British Locomotive Company; Beyer, Peacock & Company
- Order number: BP 01830
- Serial number: NBL 19593-19596, 19684-19687, 20173-20180, 20812-20821; BP 5988-5997, 6003-6012
- Model: Class 12
- Build date: 1912–1921
- Total produced: 46
Specifications
- Configuration
  - Whyte: 4-8-2
- Driver: 2nd coupled axle
- Gauge: 3 ft 6 in (1,067 mm) Cape gauge
- Leading dia.: 28 1/2 in (724 mm)
- Coupled dia.: 51 in (1,295 mm)
- Trailing dia.: 33 in (838 mm)
- Tender wheels: 34 in (864 mm)
- Wheelbase: ʘ 58 ft 1 1/2 in (17,716 mm) ʘ 58 ft 3 3/8 in (17,764 mm)
  - Engine: ʘ 31 ft 7 1/2 in (9,639 mm) ʘ 31 ft 9 1/2 in (9,690 mm)
  - Leading: ʘ 6 ft (1,829 mm) ʘ 6 ft 2 in (1,880 mm)
  - Coupled: 13 ft 6 in (4,115 mm)
  - Tender: 16 ft 9 in (5,105 mm)
  - Tender bogie: 4 ft 7 in (1,397 mm)
- Length
  - Over couplers: ʘ 66 ft 5 3/4 in (20,263 mm) ʘ 66 ft 7 3/4 in (20,314 mm)
- Height: ♠ 12 ft 10 in (3,912 mm) ♥ 12 ft 7 1/2 in (3,848 mm)
- Frame type: Plate
- Axle load: ♠ 16 LT 19 cwt (17,220 kg) ♥♣ 17 LT 5 cwt (17,530 kg) ♥♦ 16 LT 14 cwt (16,970 kg)
  - Leading: ♠ 15 LT 18 cwt (16,160 kg) ♥♣ 16 LT 2 cwt (16,360 kg) ♥♦ 15 LT 8 cwt (15,650 kg)
  - 1st coupled: ♠ 16 LT 11 cwt (16,820 kg) ♥♣ 16 LT 15 cwt (17,020 kg) ♥♦ 16 LT 1 cwt (16,310 kg)
  - 2nd coupled: ♠ 16 LT 13 cwt (16,920 kg) ♥♣ 17 LT 5 cwt (17,530 kg) ♥♦ 16 LT 14 cwt (16,970 kg)
  - 3rd coupled: ♠ 16 LT 11 cwt (16,820 kg) ♥♣ 16 LT 17 cwt (17,120 kg) ♥♦ 16 LT 2 cwt (16,360 kg)
  - 4th coupled: ♠ 16 LT 19 cwt (17,220 kg) ♥♣ 16 LT 15 cwt (17,020 kg) ♥♦ 16 LT 1 cwt (16,310 kg)
  - Trailing: ♠ 12 LT 5 cwt (12,450 kg) ♥♣ 11 LT 16 cwt (11,990 kg) ♥♦ 11 LT 6 cwt (11,480 kg)
  - Tender bogie: Bogie 1: 27 LT 10 cwt (27,940 kg); Bogie 2: 23 LT 11 cwt (23,930 kg)
  - Tender axle: 13 LT 15 cwt (13,970 kg)
- Adhesive weight: ♠ 66 LT 14 cwt (67,770 kg) ♥♣ 67 LT 12 cwt (68,680 kg) ♥♦ 64 LT 18 cwt (65,940 kg)
- Loco weight: ♠ 94 LT 17 cwt (96,370 kg) ♥♣ 95 LT 14 cwt (97,240 kg) ♥♦ 91 LT 12 cwt (93,070 kg)
- Tender weight: 51 LT 1 cwt (51,870 kg)
- Total weight: ♠ 145 LT 18 cwt (148,200 kg) ♥♣ 146 LT 15 cwt (149,100 kg) ♥♦ 142 LT 13 cwt (144,900 kg)
- Tender type: MP1 (2-axle bogies); MP, MP1, MR, MS, MT, MT1, MT2, MX, MY, MY1
- Fuel type: Coal
- Fuel capacity: 10 LT (10.2 t)
- Water cap.: 4,250 imp gal (19,300 L)
- Firebox
  - Type: ♠ Belpaire – ♥ Round-top
  - Grate area: ♠ 40 sq ft (3.7 m^{2}) ♥ 37 sq ft (3.4 m^{2})
- Boiler
  - Model: ♥ Watson Standard no. 2
  - Pitch: ♠ 7 ft 7 in (2,311 mm) ♥ 7 ft 8 1/4 in (2,343 mm)
  - Diameter: ♠♥ 5 ft 7 1/2 in (1,714 mm)
  - Tube plates: ♠ 20 ft (6,096 mm) ♥♣ 19 ft 4 in (5,893 mm) ♥♦ 19 ft 3 5/8 in (5,883 mm)
  - Small tubes: ♠ 139: 2 1/4 in (57 mm) ♥ 87: 2 1/2 in (64 mm)
  - Large tubes: ♠ 24: 5 1/2 in (140 mm) ♥ 30: 5 1/2 in (140 mm)
- Boiler pressure: 190 psi (1,310 kPa)
- Safety valve: ♠ Ramsbottom ♥ Pop
- Heating surface
  - Firebox: ♠ 160 sq ft (15 m^{2}) ♥ 142 sq ft (13.2 m^{2})
  - Tubes: ♠ 2,328 sq ft (216.3 m^{2}) ♥ 1,933 sq ft (179.6 m^{2})
  - Total surface: ♠ 2,488 sq ft (231.1 m^{2}) ♥ 2,075 sq ft (192.8 m^{2})
- Superheater
  - Heating area: ♠ 574 sq ft (53.3 m^{2}) ♥ 492 sq ft (45.7 m^{2})
- Cylinders: Two
- Cylinder size: 22 1/2 in (572 mm) bore 26 in (660 mm) stroke
- Valve gear: Walschaerts
- Valve type: Piston
- Couplers: Johnston link-and-pin AAR knuckle (1930s)
Performance figures
- Tractive effort: ♠♥ 36,780 lbf (163.6 kN) @ 75%
Career
- Operators: South African Railways
- Class: Class 12 & 12R
- Number in class: 46
- Numbers: 1494–1519, 1859–1878
- Delivered: 1912–1921
- First run: 1912
- Disposition: 42 scrapped, 4 preserved

The South African Railways Class 12 4-8-2 of 1912 was a steam locomotive.

Between April 1912 and 1922, the South African Railways placed all together 46 Class 12 steam locomotives with a 4-8-2 type wheel arrangement in goods train service.

== Manufacturers ==
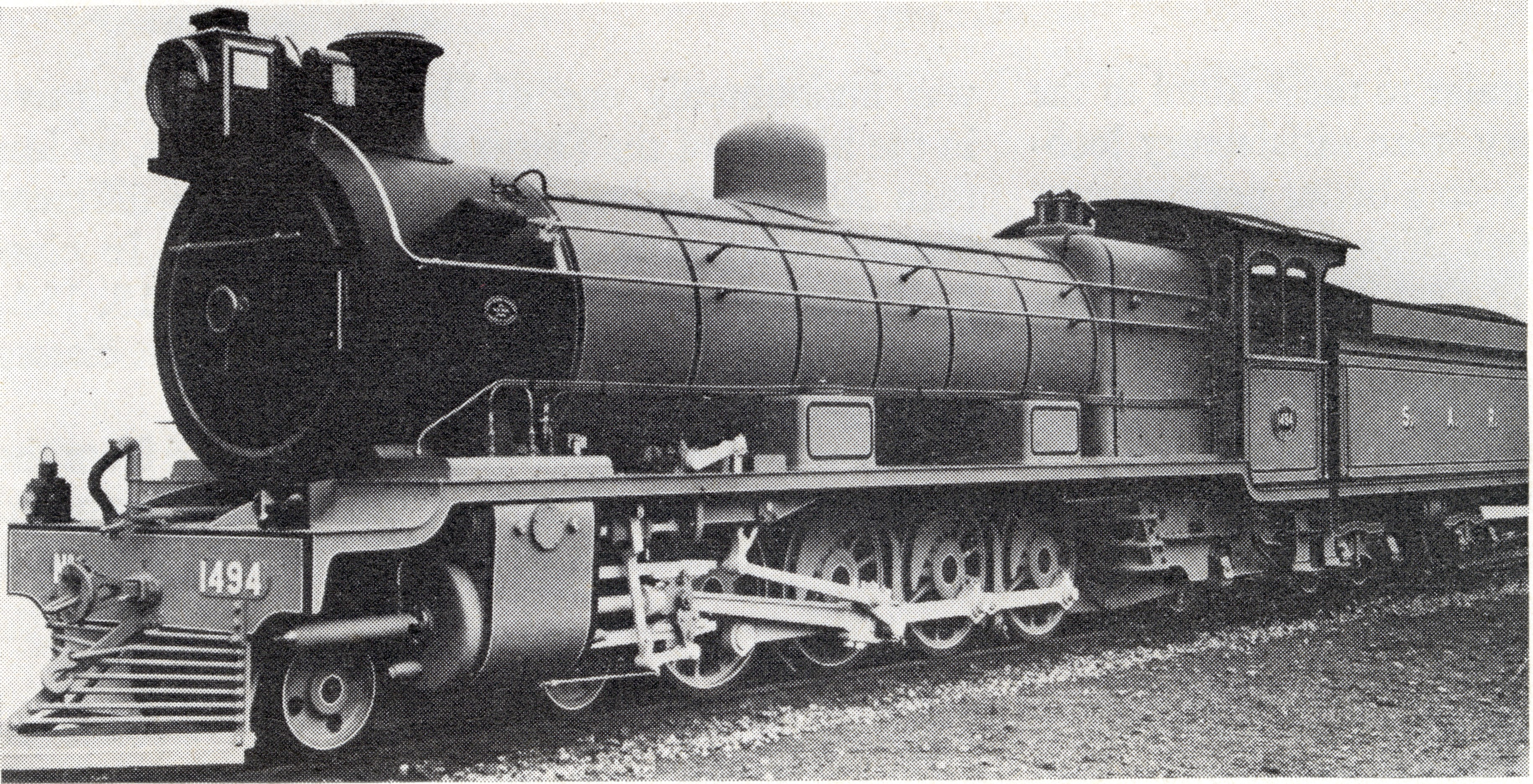
1494, as built, with a Type MP1 tender and running boards dipping down below the cab

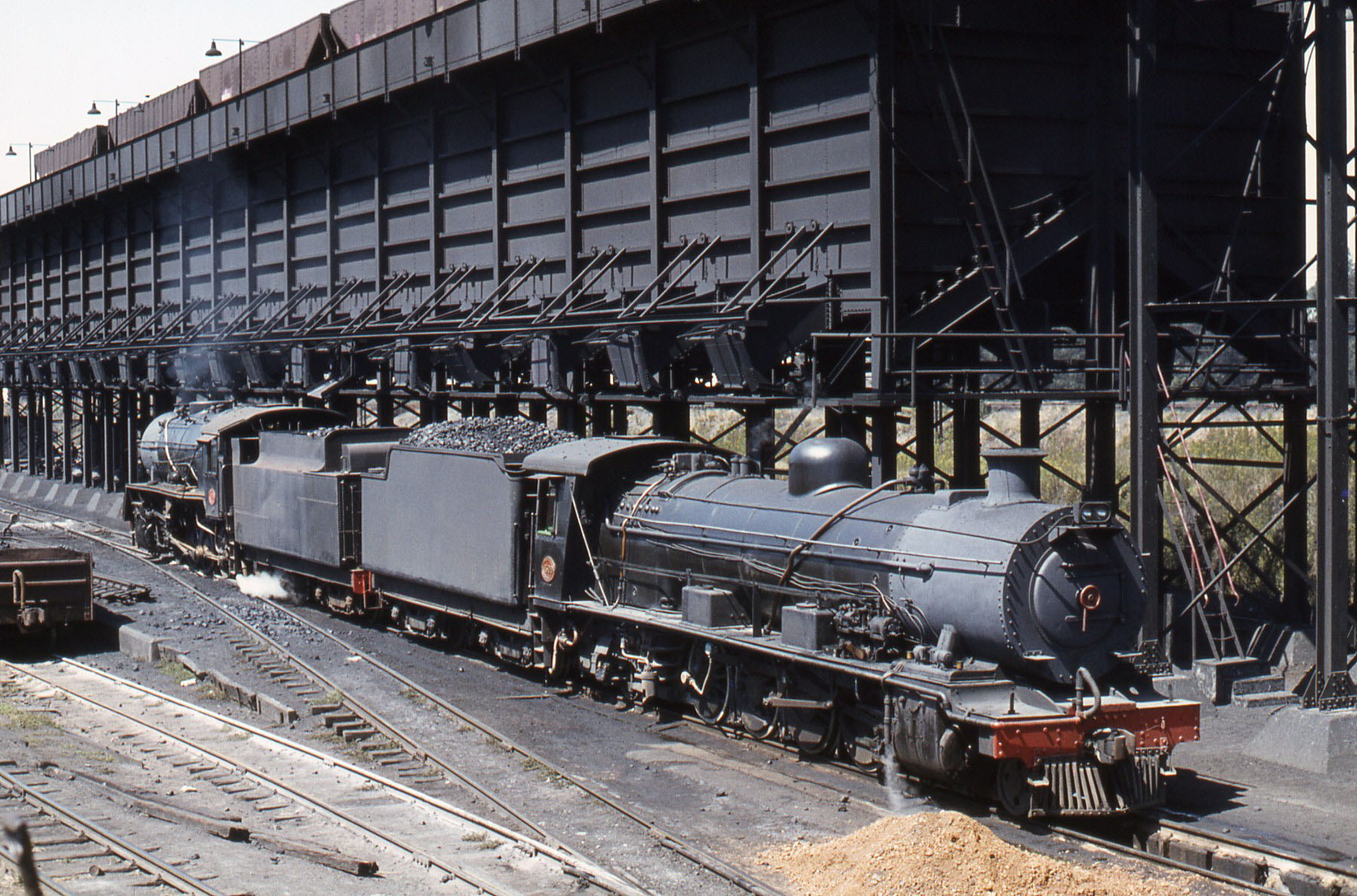
1509 with a Type MT tender, Germiston, 7 April 1979

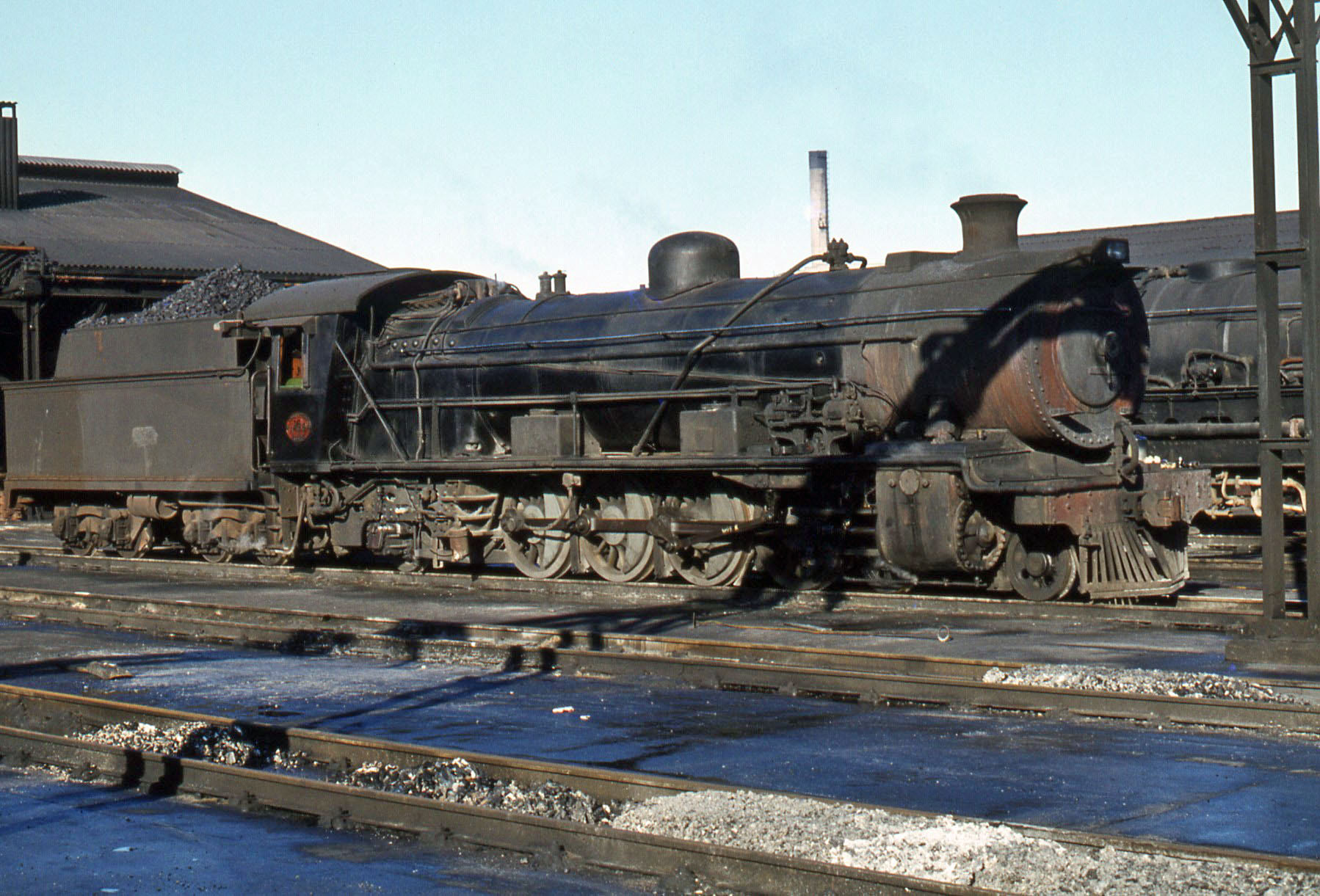
1499 with a modified Type MP1 tender, Sydenham, 16 April 1979

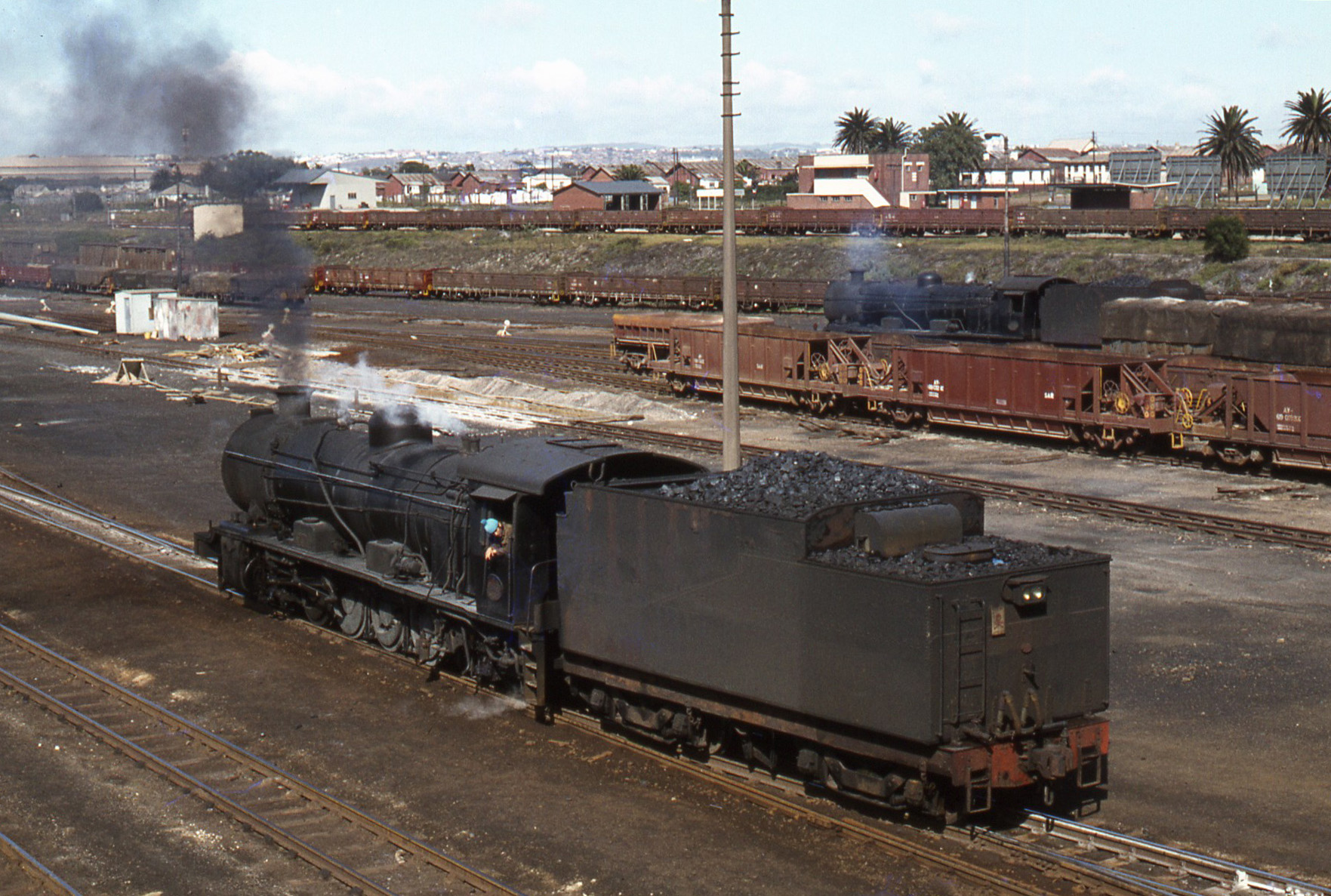
1862 with a Type MR tender, New Brighton, 31 March 1979

Design work commenced in 1910 for a new heavy goods engine for use on the heavy coal service between Witbank and Germiston. The resulting Class 12 was the first locomotive design to originate from the newly established South African Railways (SAR) in 1912. It was, in effect, an enlarged version of the already successful Class 3B which had also been designed by SAR Chief Mechanical Engineer (CME) D.A. Hendrie during his years on the Natal Government Railways.

Orders for the first eight locomotives in the Class were placed on 22 March 1911. They were built in two batches of four, the first of which was delivered from North British Locomotive Company (NBL) in April 1912, numbered in the range from 1494 to 1497. The second batch, numbered in the range from 1498 to 1501, followed shortly thereafter. These first eight locomotives had bogies with a 6 feet (1,829 millimetres) wheelbase.

These engines were followed by another eight in August 1913, numbered in the range from 1502 to 1509, and ten more in January 1915, numbered in the range from 1510 to 1519, all built by NBL. These and all subsequent Class 12 locomotives had leading bogies with a 6 feet 2 inches (1,880 millimetres) wheelbase. These locomotives were also 2 inches (51 millimetres) longer between couplers than the first eight.

In June 1921, Beyer, Peacock & Company (BP) delivered the final twenty Class 12 locomotives, built in two batches of ten and numbered in the range from 1859 to 1878.

== Characteristics ==
When the Class 12 was introduced, it was the largest non-articulated engine in South Africa and possibly in the world on railways of less than 4 feet 8 1/2 inches (1,435 millimetres) gauge. The first eight locomotives had cast steel frames for the leading bogies with three-point suspension links, similar to those of the Class 3B. On subsequent engines, this arrangement was modified to the two-point swing-link type controlled by laminated side springs, a design Hendrie adhered to in all his later engines.

The locomotives were built with plate frames, Walschaerts valve gear, superheaters and Belpaire fireboxes. It was designed to have as short a fixed wheelbase as possible and the close spacing of the coupled wheels necessitated specially designed brake hangers outside the wheels. As built, the leading coupled axle had flangeless wheels, but it was subsequently retyred with flanges.

The NBL-built locomotives were very similar in appearance to the Class 3B, with running boards which curved down below the cab at the rear and down to meet the buffer beam at the front. The only major design alteration between the NBL and BP locomotive orders was to the cab. With the earlier cabs, many drivers wore leather guards on their left legs to protect them from the heat when the fire door was open. The BP-built locomotives had larger and more spacious cabs to provide increased comfort for the enginemen, and running boards which ran straight through to the rear buffer beams.

== Tender ==
The Class 12 locomotives introduced a new Type MP1 tender with a coal capacity of 10 long tons (10.2 tonnes) and a water capacity of 4,250 imperial gallons (19,300 litres). This marked the introduction of a standard tender type which, with few modifications, was eventually to be used on all the Hendrie-designed locomotives. The tender bogies were interchangeable with other tender types operating in the Transvaal and Orange Free State at the time, while its centre longitudinal frame members were carried through unbroken from buffer to buffer. The arrangement of the buffing gear between engine and tender was the result of a long series of experiments, made with the view to avoid excessive fore and aft action between engine and tender while running at high speed.

== Watson standard boilers ==
During the 1930s, many serving locomotives were reboilered with a standard boiler type designed by then CME A.G. Watson as part of his standardisation policy. Such Watson Standard reboilered locomotives were reclassified by adding an "R" suffix to their classification.

From 1935, all 46 Class 12 locomotives were eventually reboilered with Watson Standard no. 2 boilers and reclassified to Class 12R. In the process, they were also equipped with Watson cabs with their distinctive slanted fronts to facilitate access to the firebox side stays, compared to the vertical fronts of the original cabs. In the case of the NBL-built locomotives, the reboilered engines were also fitted with running boards which continued straight through underneath their cabs. The new boilers raised the engine's boiler pitch by 1 1/4 inches (32 millimetres).

At the same time, the footplate was extended at the back end, in the form of a platform overhanging the tender, which dispensed with the usual fall plate between engine and tender. A handrail was provided, passing round the back of the footplate without impeding the stoker's access to the coal bunker, an arrangement which was subsequently adopted as standard practice. It gave the stoker a much more stable foothold and reduced the risk to the crew in the event of a broken intermediate drawbar. Many of the reboilered locomotives also received new Type MT tenders with a coal capacity of 12 long tons (12.2 tonnes) and a water capacity of 6,000 imperial gallons (27,300 litres).

Their original boilers were fitted with Ramsbottom safety valves, while the Watson Standard boilers were fitted with Pop safety valves. An obvious difference between an original and a Watson Standard reboilered locomotive is usually a rectangular regulator cover, just to the rear of the chimney on the reboilered locomotive. In the case of the Class 12 engines, two even more obvious differences are the Watson cab and the absence of the Belpaire firebox hump between the cab and boiler on the reboilered locomotives.

== Service ==
=== South African Railways ===
The locomotives gave outstanding performance with low maintenance costs. They proved to be most successful in the service they had been designed for, handling loads of 1,400 tons and doing the return trip between Witbank and Germiston in one day. This compared favourably with the 2-6-6-0 and 2-6-6-2 Mallet locomotives which, while able to handle 1,600 tons, could not make a round trip in one day.

They were also used around Ladysmith in Natal. In the 1940s, the Natal locomotives were relocated to the Orange Free State, where some were shedded at Bloemfontein and at Bethlehem, all in shunting service. The Transvaal had a large contingent stationed at Springs, Germiston and Krugersdorp, also mainly used for shunting.

By the 1950s, some were allocated to the Cape Midland system, stationed at Sydenham in Port Elizabeth. Until the Midland received Class 15F locomotives in 1957, they worked the mainline section to Cradock. Even though they were subsequently allocated to dock shunting and yard work in the New Brighton marshalling yards, they still assisted with mainline work when required and, in spite of their small 51 inches (1,295 millimetres) diameter coupled wheels, were comfortable at 60 miles per hour (97 kilometres per hour) when employed in tandem with the larger Class 15F.

Towards the end of the 1950s, the traditional Class 6 and occasionally Class 3R carriage-yard pilots at Bloemfontein made way for the much sturdier Class 12R which were displaced by Class 15Fs on the Cape Midland mainline. Although they had been drafted in for these old-age duties, the phenomenal growth in traffic during the 1960s had the result that the Class 12R were also frequently used for road jobs on the Kroonstad as well as the Bethlehem-Harrismith mainlines.

=== Zambian Railways ===
Ten Class 12R locomotives were briefly hired to the Zambian Railways during a peak in that country's perpetual diesel motive power crisis in 1980, but were soon returned since the Zambian knowledge base on steam maintenance had virtually disappeared by then.

=== Industrial ===
For some reason, few Class 12 locomotives ended up in industrial service despite their evident suitability for such work. Only five were sold into private service.

- NBL-built no. 1510 went to Umgala Colliery at Utrecht as no. 7.
- NBL-built no. 1511 went to Middelplaas Manganese as no. SL001.
- NBL-built no. 1515 went first to Tweefontein Colliery and later to Witbank Consolidated Coal Mine.
- BP-built no. 1863 and 1864 went to Middelplaas Manganese as numbers SL002 and SL003 respectively.

== Works numbers ==
The Class 12 builders, years built and works numbers are listed in the table.

Class 12 & 12R 4-8-2 Builders, years built, works numbers and bogie wheelbase
Builder	Year built	Works No.	Bogie wheelbase	SAR No.
NBL	1912	19593	6 ft (1,829 mm)	1494
NBL	1912	19594	6 ft (1,829 mm)	1495
NBL	1912	19595	6 ft (1,829 mm)	1496
NBL	1912	19596	6 ft (1,829 mm)	1497
NBL	1912	19684	6 ft (1,829 mm)	1498
NBL	1912	19685	6 ft (1,829 mm)	1499
NBL	1912	19686	6 ft (1,829 mm)	1500
NBL	1912	19687	6 ft (1,829 mm)	1501
NBL	1913	20173	6 ft 2 in (1,880 mm)	1502
NBL	1913	20174	6 ft 2 in (1,880 mm)	1503
NBL	1913	20175	6 ft 2 in (1,880 mm)	1504
NBL	1913	20176	6 ft 2 in (1,880 mm)	1505
NBL	1913	20177	6 ft 2 in (1,880 mm)	1506
NBL	1913	20178	6 ft 2 in (1,880 mm)	1507
NBL	1913	20179	6 ft 2 in (1,880 mm)	1508
NBL	1913	20180	6 ft 2 in (1,880 mm)	1509
NBL	1914	20812	6 ft 2 in (1,880 mm)	1510
NBL	1914	20813	6 ft 2 in (1,880 mm)	1511
NBL	1914	20814	6 ft 2 in (1,880 mm)	1512
NBL	1914	20815	6 ft 2 in (1,880 mm)	1513
NBL	1914	20816	6 ft 2 in (1,880 mm)	1514
NBL	1914	20817	6 ft 2 in (1,880 mm)	1515
NBL	1914	20818	6 ft 2 in (1,880 mm)	1516
NBL	1914	20819	6 ft 2 in (1,880 mm)	1517
NBL	1914	20820	6 ft 2 in (1,880 mm)	1518
NBL	1914	20821	6 ft 2 in (1,880 mm)	1519
BP	1921	5988	6 ft 2 in (1,880 mm)	1859
BP	1921	5989	6 ft 2 in (1,880 mm)	1860
BP	1921	5990	6 ft 2 in (1,880 mm)	1861
BP	1921	5991	6 ft 2 in (1,880 mm)	1862
BP	1921	5992	6 ft 2 in (1,880 mm)	1863
BP	1921	5993	6 ft 2 in (1,880 mm)	1864
BP	1921	5994	6 ft 2 in (1,880 mm)	1865
BP	1921	5995	6 ft 2 in (1,880 mm)	1866
BP	1921	5996	6 ft 2 in (1,880 mm)	1867
BP	1921	5997	6 ft 2 in (1,880 mm)	1868
BP	1921	6003	6 ft 2 in (1,880 mm)	1869
BP	1921	6004	6 ft 2 in (1,880 mm)	1870
BP	1921	6005	6 ft 2 in (1,880 mm)	1871
BP	1921	6006	6 ft 2 in (1,880 mm)	1872
BP	1921	6007	6 ft 2 in (1,880 mm)	1873
BP	1921	6008	6 ft 2 in (1,880 mm)	1874
BP	1921	6009	6 ft 2 in (1,880 mm)	1875
BP	1921	6010	6 ft 2 in (1,880 mm)	1876
BP	1921	6011	6 ft 2 in (1,880 mm)	1877
BP	1921	6012	6 ft 2 in (1,880 mm)	1878

== Preservation ==
Class	Number	Works nmr	THF / Private	Leaselend / Owner	Current Location	Outside South Africa	?
12R	1865	BP 5994	Private		Kimberley Locomotive Depot		
12R	1947	BALDWIN 52754	THF	Reefsteamers	Germiston Locomotive Depot		
12R	1505	NBL 20176	THF	Umgeni Steam Railway	Kloofstation (Inchaga)		
12A	2111	NBL 22751	THF		Bloemfontein Locomotive Depot		
12AR	1535	NBL 21753	THF	Reefsteamers	Germiston Locomotive Depot		
