= South African type MT2 tender =

Steam locomotive tender

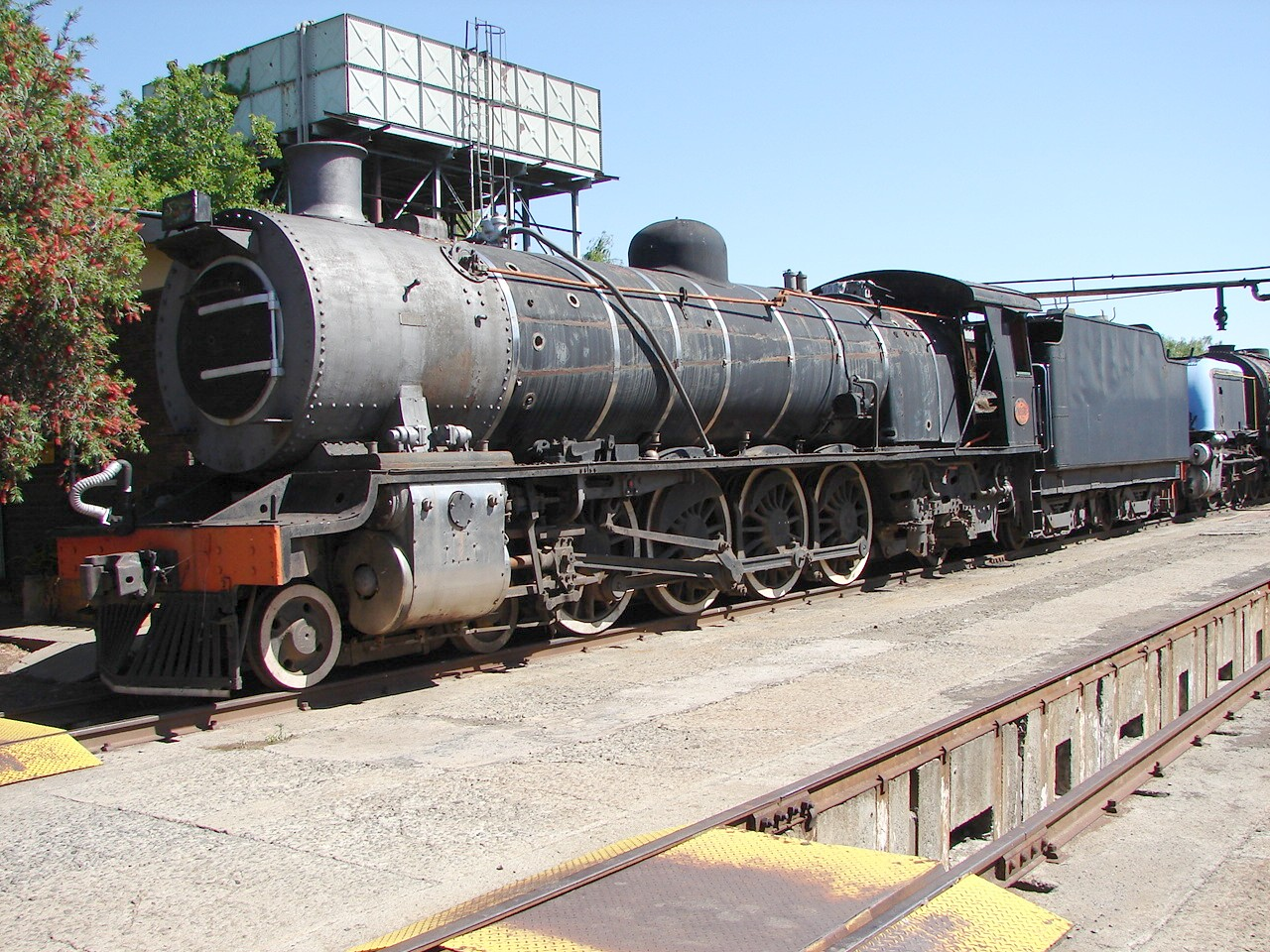
- Type MT2 tender on Class 15AR, 2009
Type and origin
- Locomotive: Class 12A, Class 19B, Class 19C, Class 19D
- Designer: South African Railways
- Builder: South African Railways
- In service: 1945-1948
- Rebuilt from: Type MT
Specifications
- Configuration: 2-axle bogies
- Gauge: 3 ft 6 in (1,067 mm) Cape gauge
- Length: 27 ft 5 3/8 in (8,366 mm)
- Wheel dia.: 34 in (864 mm)
- Wheelbase: 20 ft 5 in (6,223 mm)
  - Bogie: 6 ft 2 in (1,880 mm)
- Axle load: 17 LT 15 cwt (18,030 kg)
  - Front bogie: 33 LT 18 cwt (34,440 kg)
  - Rear bogie: 35 LT 10 cwt (36,070 kg)
- Weight empty: 61,520 lb (27,910 kg)
- Weight w/o: 69 LT 8 cwt (70,510 kg)
- Fuel type: Coal
- Fuel cap.: 14 LT (14.2 t)
- Water cap.: 6,000 imp gal (27,300 L)
- Stoking: Manual
- Couplers: Drawbar & AAR knuckle
Career
- Operators: South African Railways

The South African type MT2 tender was a steam locomotive tender.

Type MT2 tenders were modified Type MT tenders with enlarged coal bunkers. The original Type MT tenders entered service on the South African Railways between 1928 and 1945.

== Origin ==
Type MT tenders were built between 1928 and 1945 by Berliner Maschinenbau, Borsig Lokomotiv Werke, Henschel and Son, Friedrich Krupp AG, North British Locomotive Company, Robert Stephenson and Hawthorns, and Škoda Works as tenders to the Classes 12A, 19B, 19C and 19D 4-8-2 Mountain type steam locomotives which were placed in service by the South African Railways during that period.

== Rebuilding ==
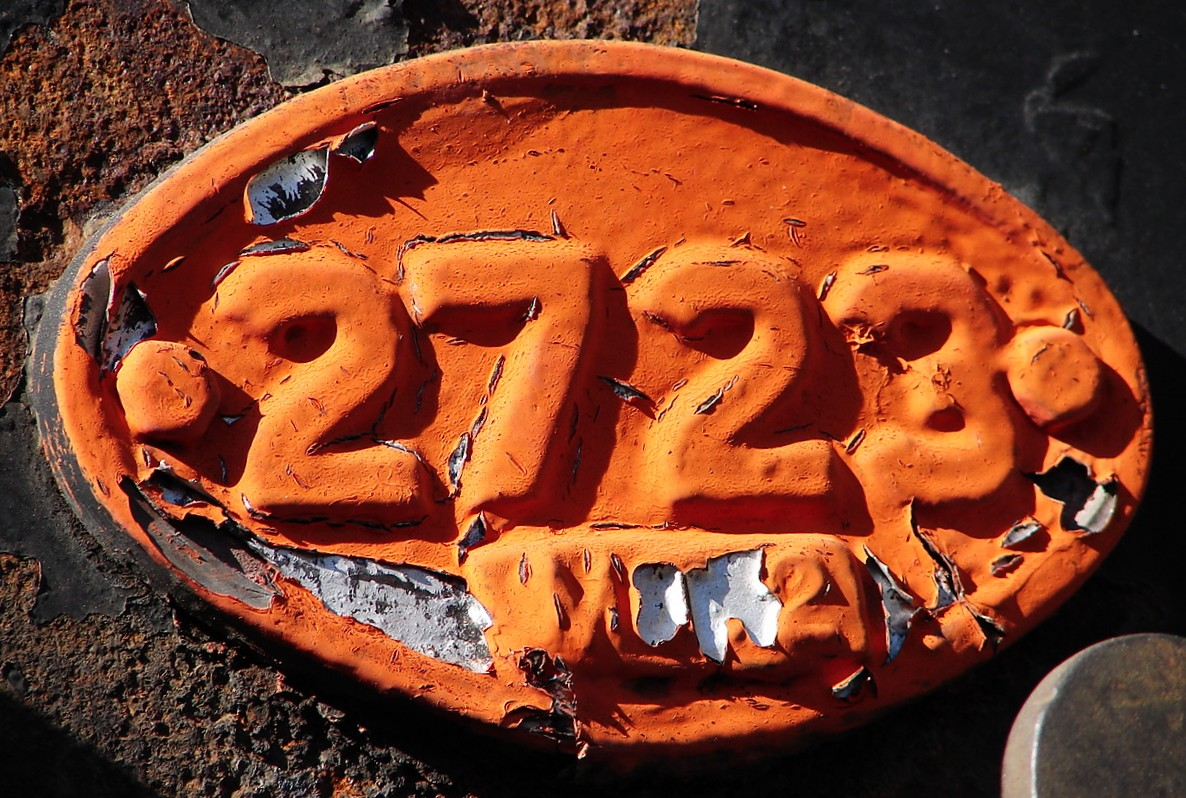
Plate on no. 2723

Between 1945 and 1948, several of these tenders were reclassified to Type MT2 after being modified to increase their coal capacity by extending the top of the coal bunker rearwards.

== Characteristics ==
The rebuilt tender had a coal capacity which had been increased from 12 long tons (12.2 tonnes) to 14 long tons (14.2 tonnes). Its water capacity remained the same.

== Classification letters ==
Since many tender types are interchangeable between different locomotive classes and types, a tender classification system was adopted by the SAR. The first letter of the tender type indicates the classes of engines to which it could be coupled. The "M_" tenders could be used with the locomotive classes as shown, although engine drawbars and intermediate emergency chains had to be replaced or adjusted to suit the target locomotive in some cases.

- Class 12, Class 12A and Class 12B.
- Class 14, Class 14A and Class 14B.
- Class 15 and Class 15A.
- Class 16, Class 16A, Class 16B and Class 16C.
- Class 19, Class 19A, Class 19B, Class 19C and Class 19D.
- Class 20.
- Class 24.
- Class MC1, Class MH and Class MJ.
- Class S2.

The second letter indicates the tender's water capacity. The "_T" tenders had a capacity of between 5,587 and 6,000 imperial gallons (25,400 and 27,300 litres; 6,710 and 7,210 US gallons).

A number, when added after the letter code, indicates differences between similar tender types, such as function, wheelbase or coal bunker capacity.
