= South African type MS tender =

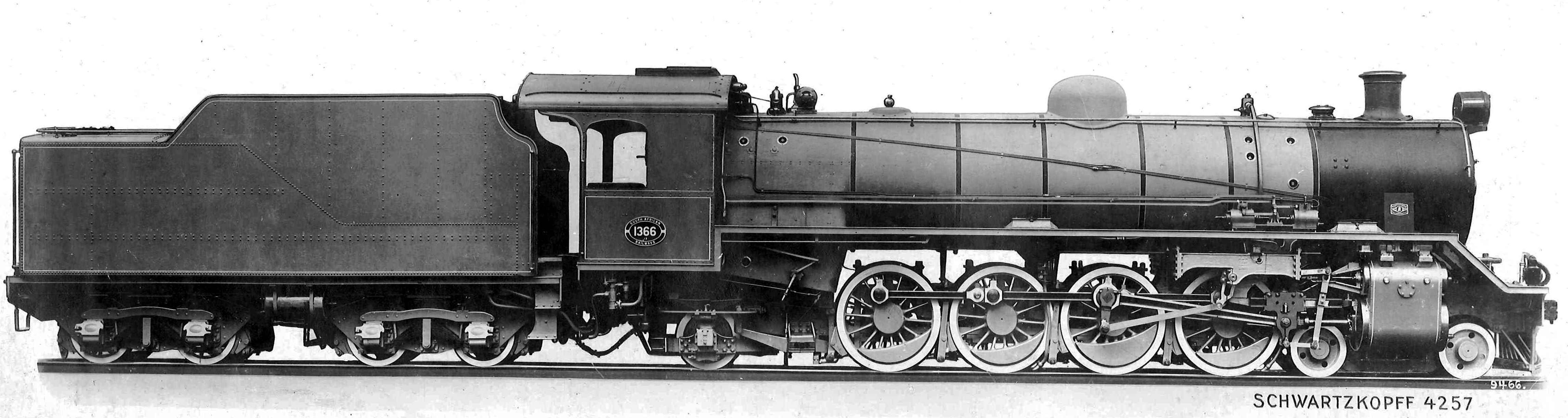
- Type MS tender on SAR Class 19, c. 1928
Type and origin
- Locomotive: Class 19
- Designer: South African Railways (Col F.R. Collins DSO)
- Builder: Berliner Maschinenbau
- In service: 1928
Specifications
- Configuration: 2-axle bogies
- Gauge: 3 ft 6 in (1,067 mm) Cape gauge
- Length: 25 ft 11 3/8 in (7,909 mm)
- Wheel dia.: 34 in (864 mm)
- Wheelbase: 16 ft 9 in (5,105 mm)
  - Bogie: 4 ft 7 in (1,397 mm)
- Axle load: 14 LT 14 cwt (14,940 kg)
  - Front bogie: 28 LT 16 cwt (29,260 kg)
  - Rear bogie: 29 LT 8 cwt (29,870 kg)
- Weight empty: 55,504 lb (25,176 kg)
- Weight w/o: 58 LT 4 cwt (59,130 kg)
- Fuel type: Coal
- Fuel cap.: 11 LT (11.2 t)
- Water cap.: 5,000 imp gal (22,700 L)
- Stoking: Manual
- Couplers: Drawbar & AAR knuckle
Career
- Operators: South African Railways
- Numbers: SAR 1366–1369

The South African type MS tender was a steam locomotive tender.

Type MS tenders entered service in 1928, as tenders to the Class 19 4-8-2 Mountain type branchline steam locomotives which were placed in service by the South African Railways in that year.

== Manufacturer ==
Type MS tenders were built in 1928 by Berliner Maschinenbau in Germany.

The South African Railways (SAR) placed four Class 19 4-8-2 Mountain type branchline locomotives in service in 1928. The engines and tenders were designed under the direction of Col F.R. Collins DSO, Chief Mechanical Engineer of the SAR, by Research and Test Engineer M.M. Loubser, himself later to be appointed as CME. The locomotives were placed in service on the line between Kimberley and Vryburg, but they eventually spent their later working years at Empangeni and on the Bergville branch in Natal. The Type MS entered service as tenders to these locomotives.

== Characteristics ==
The tender had a coal capacity of 11 long tons (11.2 tonnes), a water capacity of 5,000 imperial gallons (22,700 litres) and a maximum axle load of 14 long tons 14 hundredweight (14,940 kilograms).

== Locomotive ==
Only the four Class 19 locomotives were delivered new with Type MS tenders, which were numbered for their engines in the range from 1366 to 1369. An oval number plate, bearing the engine number and often also the tender type, was attached to the rear end of the tender.

== Classification letters ==
Since many tender types are interchangeable between different locomotive classes and types, a tender classification system was adopted by the SAR. The first letter of the tender type indicates the classes of engines to which it could be coupled. The "M_" tenders could be used with the locomotive classes as shown, although in some cases, engine drawbars and intermediate emergency chains had to be replaced or adjusted to suit the target locomotive.

- Class 12, Class 12A and Class 12B.
- Class 14, Class 14A and Class 14B.
- Class 15 and Class 15A.
- Class 16, Class 16A, Class 16B and Class 16C.
- Class 19, Class 19A, Class 19B, Class 19C and Class 19D.
- Class 20.
- Class 24.
- Class MC1, Class MH and Class MJ.
- Class S2.

The second letter indicates the tender's water capacity. The "_S" tenders had a capacity of 5,000 imperial gallons (22,700 litres; 6,000 US gallons).
