= South African type MP tender =

Steam locomotive introduced in 1929

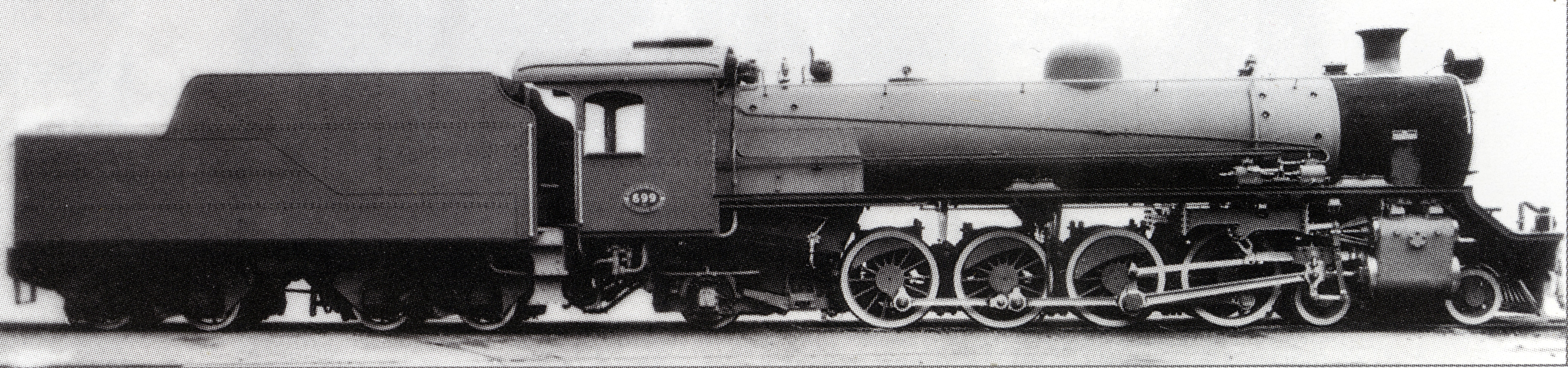
- Type MP tender on SAR Class 19A, c. 1929
Type and origin
- Locomotive: Class 19A
- Designer: South African Railways (Col F.R. Collins DSO)
- Builder: Swiss Locomotive and Machine
- In service: 1929
Specifications
- Configuration: 2-axle bogies
- Gauge: 3 ft 6 in (1,067 mm) Cape gauge
- Length: 25 ft 11 3/8 in (7,909 mm)
- Wheel dia.: 34 in (864 mm)
- Wheelbase: 16 ft 9 in (5,105 mm)
  - Bogie: 4 ft 7 in (1,397 mm)
- Axle load: 12 LT 17 cwt 2 qtr (13,080 kg)
  - Front bogie: 25 LT 15 cwt (26,160 kg)
  - Rear bogie: 25 LT 4 cwt (25,600 kg)
- Weight empty: 51,020 lb (23,140 kg)
- Weight w/o: 50 LT 19 cwt (51,770 kg)
- Fuel type: Coal
- Fuel cap.: 9 LT 4 cwt (9.3 t)
- Water cap.: 4,250 imp gal (19,300 L)
- Stoking: Manual
- Couplers: Drawbar & AAR knuckle
Career
- Operators: South African Railways
- Numbers: SAR 675-710

The South African type MP tender was a steam locomotive tender.

Type MP tenders entered service in 1929, as tenders to the Class 19A 4-8-2 Mountain type branch line steam locomotives which were placed in service by the South African Railways in that year.

== Manufacturer ==
Type MP tenders were built in 1929 by Swiss Locomotive and Machine Works in Winterthur.

The South African Railways (SAR) placed 36 Class 19A 4-8-2 Mountain type branch line locomotives in service in 1929. The engines and tenders were designed by Col F.R. Collins DSO as a lighter version of the Class 19 locomotive which had entered service in 1928. The locomotives were placed in service on all systems of the SAR, but were later based mainly at Mason's Mill, Estcourt and Glencoe in Natal, at East London, Queenstown and Burgersdorp in the Eastern Cape, at Cape Town in the Western Cape and a few in the Western Transvaal.

== Characteristics ==
The tender had a coal capacity of 9 long tons 4 hundredweight (9.3 tonnes), a water capacity of 4,250 imperial gallons (19,300 litres) and a maximum axle load of 12 long tons 17 hundredweight 2 quarters (13,080 kilograms).

== Locomotive ==
Only the 36 Class 19A locomotives were delivered new with Type MP tenders, which were numbered for their engines in the range from 675 to 710. An oval number plate, bearing the engine number and often also the tender type, was attached to the rear end of the tender.

== Classification letters ==
Since many tender types are interchangeable between different locomotive classes and types, a tender classification system was adopted by the SAR. The first letter of the tender type indicates the classes of engines to which it could be coupled. The "M_" tenders could be used with the locomotive classes as shown below, although in some cases engine drawbars and intermediate emergency chains had to be replaced or adjusted to suit the target locomotive.

- Class 12, Class 12A and Class 12B.
- Class 14, Class 14A and Class 14B.
- Class 15 and Class 15A.
- Class 16, Class 16A, Class 16B and Class 16C.
- Class 19, Class 19A, Class 19B, Class 19C and Class 19D.
- Class 20.
- Class 24.
- Class MC1, Class MH and Class MJ.
- Class S2.

The second letter indicates the tender's water capacity. The "_P" tenders had a capacity of 4,250 imperial gallons (19,300 litres; 5,100 US gallons).

A number, when added after the letter code, indicates differences between similar tender types, such as function, wheelbase or coal bunker capacity.
