= South African Class 14A 4-8-2 =

1914 design of steam locomotive

South African Class 14A & 14R 4-8-2
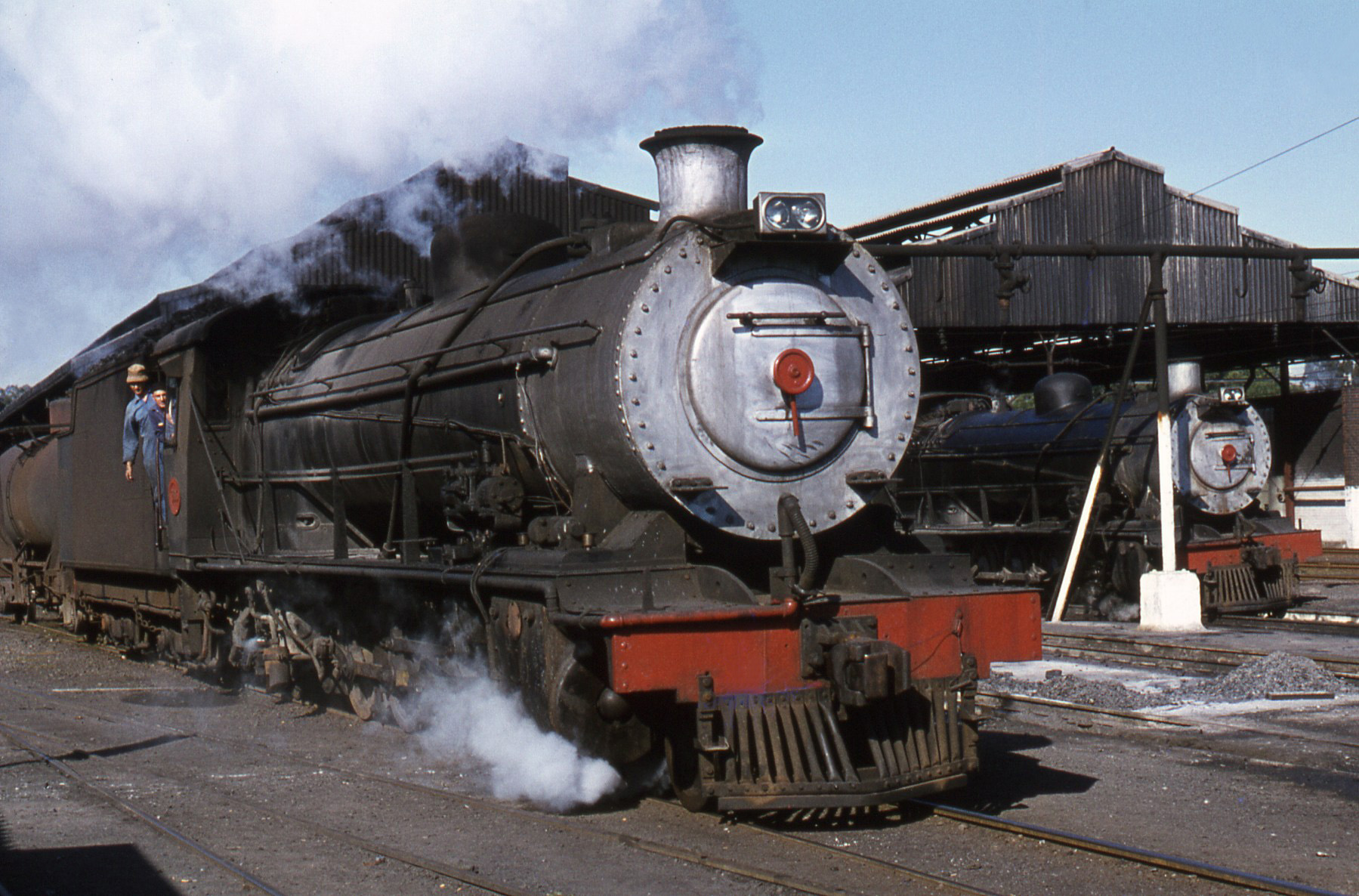
- Class 14R no. 1905 at Klerksdorp, 17 April 1978
Type and origin
- ♠ Class 14A as built with a Belpaire firebox ♥ Class 14R rebuilt with a Watson Standard boiler ♣ Steel firebox - ♦ Copper firebox
- Power type: Steam
- Designer: South African Railways (D.A. Hendrie)
- Builder: North British Locomotive Company
- Serial number: 20568-20587, 20822-20842
- Model: Class 14A
- Build date: 1914
- Total produced: 41
Specifications
- Configuration
  - Whyte: 4-8-2 (Mountain)
  - UIC: 2'D1'h2
- Driver: 2nd coupled axle
- Gauge: 3 ft 6 in (1,067 mm) Cape gauge
- Leading dia.: 28 1/2 in (724 mm)
- Coupled dia.: 48 in (1,219 mm)
- Trailing dia.: 33 in (838 mm)
- Tender wheels: 34 in (864 mm)
- Wheelbase: 56 ft 11 3/4 in (17,367 mm)
  - Engine: 30 ft 7 in (9,322 mm)
  - Leading: 6 ft 2 in (1,880 mm)
  - Coupled: 12 ft 9 in (3,886 mm)
  - Tender: 16 ft 9 in (5,105 mm)
  - Tender bogie: 4 ft 7 in (1,397 mm)
- Length: 65 ft 4 5/8 in (19,929 mm)
- Height: ♠ 12 ft 10 in (3,912 mm) ♥ 12 ft 11 3/4 in (3,956 mm)
- Axle load: ♠ 15 LT (15,240 kg) ♥♣ 15 LT 16 cwt (16,050 kg)
  - Leading: ♠ 14 LT 6 cwt (14,530 kg) ♥♣ 15 LT 12 cwt (15,850 kg)
  - 1st coupled: ♠ 14 LT 19 cwt (15,190 kg) ♥♣ 14 LT 14 cwt (14,940 kg)
  - 2nd coupled: ♠ 15 LT (15,240 kg) ♥♣ 15 LT 16 cwt (16,050 kg)
  - 3rd coupled: ♠ 14 LT 19 cwt (15,190 kg) ♥♣ 15 LT 2 cwt (15,340 kg)
  - 4th coupled: ♠ 14 LT 19 cwt (15,190 kg) ♥ ♣ 14 LT 18 cwt (15,140 kg)
  - Trailing: ♠ 11 LT 7 cwt (11,530 kg) ♥♣ 10 LT 19 cwt (11,130 kg)
  - Tender bogie: Bogie 1: 27 LT 10 cwt (27,940 kg); Bogie 2: 23 LT 11 cwt (23,930 kg)
  - Tender axle: 13 LT 15 cwt (13,970 kg)
- Adhesive weight: ♠ 59 LT 17 cwt (60,810 kg) ♥♣ 60 LT 10 cwt (61,470 kg)
- Loco weight: ♠ 85 LT 10 cwt (86,870 kg) ♥♣ 87 LT 6 cwt (88,700 kg)
- Tender weight: 51 LT 1 cwt (51,870 kg)
- Total weight: ♠ 136 LT 11 cwt (138,700 kg) ♥♣ 138 LT 7 cwt (140,600 kg)
- Tender type: MP1 (2-axle bogies); MP, MP1, MR, MS, MT, MT1, MT2, MX, MY, MY1 permitted
- Fuel type: Coal
- Fuel capacity: 10 LT (10.2 t)
- Water cap.: 4,250 imp gal (19,300 L)
- Generator: Pyle National turbo
- Firebox
  - Type: ♠ Belpaire - ♥ Round-top
  - Grate area: 37 sq ft (3.4 m^{2})
- Boiler
  - Model: Watson Standard no. 2
  - Pitch: ♠ 7 ft 7 in (2,311 mm) ♥ 8 ft 1/2 in (2,451 mm)
  - Diameter: ♠ 5 ft 1 5/8 in (1,565 mm) ♥ 5 ft 7 1/2 in (1,714 mm)
  - Tube plates: ♠ 19 ft (5,791 mm) ♥♣ 19 ft 4 in (5,893 mm) ♥♦ 19 ft 3 5/8 in (5,883 mm)
  - Small tubes: ♠ 119: 2 1/4 in (57 mm) ♥ 87: 2 1/2 in (64 mm)
  - Large tubes: ♠ 21: 5 1/2 in (140 mm) ♥ 30: 5 1/2 in (140 mm)
- Boiler pressure: ♠ 180 psi (1,241 kPa) ♥ 190 psi (1,310 kPa)
- Safety valve: ♠ Ramsbottom - ♥ Pop
- Heating surface
  - Firebox: ♠ 150 sq ft (14 m^{2}) ♥ 142 sq ft (13.2 m^{2})
  - Tubes: ♠ 1,909 sq ft (177.4 m^{2}) ♥ 1,933 sq ft (179.6 m^{2})
  - Total surface: ♠ 2,059 sq ft (191.3 m^{2}) ♥ 2,075 sq ft (192.8 m^{2})
- Superheater
  - Heating area: ♠ 483 sq ft (44.9 m^{2}) ♥ 492 sq ft (45.7 m^{2})
- Cylinders: Two
- Cylinder size: 21 in (533 mm) bore 26 in (660 mm) stroke
- Valve gear: Walschaerts
- Valve type: Piston
- Couplers: Johnston link-and-pin AAR knuckle (1930s)
Performance figures
- Tractive effort: ♠ 32,250 lbf (143.5 kN) @ 75% ♥ 37,360 lbf (166.2 kN) @ 75%
Career
- Operators: South African Railways
- Class: Class 14A & 14R
- Number in class: 41
- Numbers: 1576-1595, 1901-1921
- Delivered: 1914-1915
- First run: 1914
- The leading coupled axle had flangeless wheels

The South African Railways Class 14A 4-8-2 of 1914 was a steam locomotive.

In 1914 and 1915, the South African Railways placed 41 Class 14A steam locomotives with a 4-8-2 Mountain type wheel arrangement in service. It was a lighter version of the Class 14 which had entered service a year earlier.

== Manufacturer ==
Following the success of the Class 14, D.A. Hendrie, Chief Mechanical Engineer (CME) of the South African Railways (SAR), used its design as basis for the lighter Class 14A locomotive for use on coastal lines, particularly the Cape Eastern line from East London where the physical conditions were approximately similar to those of the lower sections of the Natal mainline, but the permanent way was not as heavy. This second version of the Class 14 was ordered from the North British Locomotive Company in 1913 and was built in two batches. Twenty were delivered in 1914, numbered in the range from 1576 to 1595, and another 21 in 1914 and 1915, numbered in the range from 1901 to 1921.

== Characteristics ==
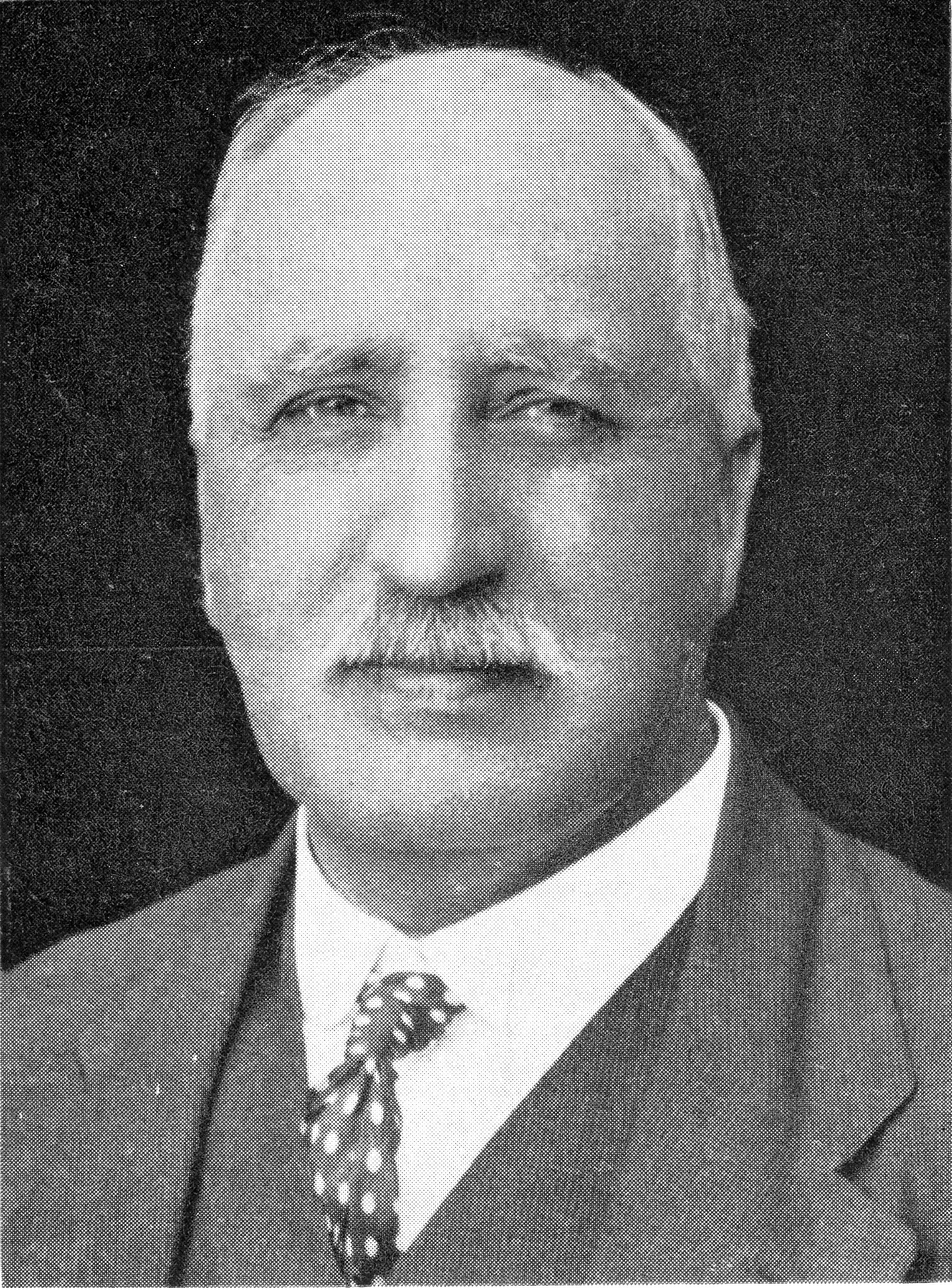
D.A. Hendrie

Like the Class 14, the Class 14A had piston valves, Walschaerts valve gear, a Belpaire firebox and was superheated, but it had nearly 6 inches (152 millimetres) less boiler diameter than the Class 14 to reduce the axle loading from 16 long tons 3 hundredweight (16,410 kilograms) to 15 long tons (15,240 kilograms). To compensate for the smaller boilers, they were equipped with smaller cylinders with a bore of 21 inches (533 millimetres) instead of 22 inches (560 millimetres).

The locomotives were erected at the East London workshops. Apart from their boilers and cylinders, the frame and other important components were standard with those of the Class 14, such as the coupled wheels, bogie, Pyle National turbo-generators and headlamps, Hasler speed indicator, sight feed lubricators, Hendrie's steam reversing gear, steam operation for rocking the firegrate, Gresham and Craven injectors, steam brakes and combination vacuum ejectors. It was also delivered with Type MP1 tenders which had a coal capacity of 10 long tons (10.2 tonnes) and a water capacity of 4,250 imperial gallons (19,300 litres). One noticeable visible difference from the Class 14 was the absence of the two large sandboxes on each running board.

== Watson Standard boilers ==
During the 1930s, many serving locomotives were reboilered with a standard boiler type designed by then CME A.G. Watson as part of his standardisation policy. Such Watson Standard reboilered locomotives were reclassified by adding an "R" suffix to their classification.

From the mid-1930s, all the Class 14A locomotives except no. 1915 were eventually reboilered with Watson Standard no. 2 boilers. In the process they were also equipped with Watson cabs with their distinctive slanted fronts, compared to the conventional vertical fronts of their original cabs. In spite of still being nearly 3 long tons (3.0 tonnes) lighter after reboilering, they were reclassified to Class 14R along with reboilered Class 14 locomotives instead of to Class 14AR. Even so, they could still be identified as ex Class 14A locomotives by the absence of the big sandboxes on their running boards.

Their original Belpaire boilers were fitted with Ramsbottom safety valves, while the Watson Standard boiler was fitted with Pop safety valves. An obvious difference between an original and a Watson Standard reboilered locomotive is usually a rectangular regulator cover just to the rear of the chimney on the reboilered locomotive. In the case of reboilered Class 14A locomotives, two even more obvious differences are the Watson cab and the absence of the Belpaire firebox hump between the cab and boiler on the reboilered locomotives.

== Service ==
=== South African Railways ===
As intended, the Class 14A was placed in service on the East London mainline. Although they were good engines, they were not very successful there and were soon relocated to be shared between the Cape Western system for use between Cape Town and Beaufort West and the Eastern Transvaal system for use on the line to Delagoa Bay out of Pretoria, particularly between Waterval Boven and Komatipoort. The Cape Western's engines later joined the rest of the Class in the Eastern Transvaal. They proved themselves as free steaming locomotives, low on maintenance costs and trouble-free, and therefore popular with crews and fitters alike.

=== Industrial ===
Six were eventually sold into industrial service.

- No. 1586 went to Rustenburg Platinum Mines, retaining its SAR number.
- No. 1589 became Bob at the Vaal Reefs Gold Mine.
- No. 1906 became Randfontein Estates Gold Mine no. 6.
- No. 1908 became Apex Colliery no. 4 at Greenside.
- No. 1918 went to St Helena Gold Mines.
- No. 1921 became Grootvlei Proprietary Mines Limited no. 3 Duggie.

== Preservation ==
Number	Works nmr	THF / Private	Leaselend / Owner	Current Location	Outside South Africa	?
1576		Private	Umgeni Steam Railway	Kloofstation (Inchanga)		
1701		Private	Greenside Colliery	Greenside Colliery		
1718		THF		Bloemfontein Locomotive Depot		
1733		THF		Krugersdorp Locomotive Depot		
1759		THF		Bloemfontein Locomotive Depot		
1908		Private	Greenside Colliery	Greenside Colliery		

== Illustration ==
The main picture shows second order Class 14R no. 1905 at Klerksdorp, Transvaal, on 17 April 1978. The first of the following pictures illustrate the locomotive as built, while the rest show reboilered Class 14R (ex Class 14A) locomotives in service.

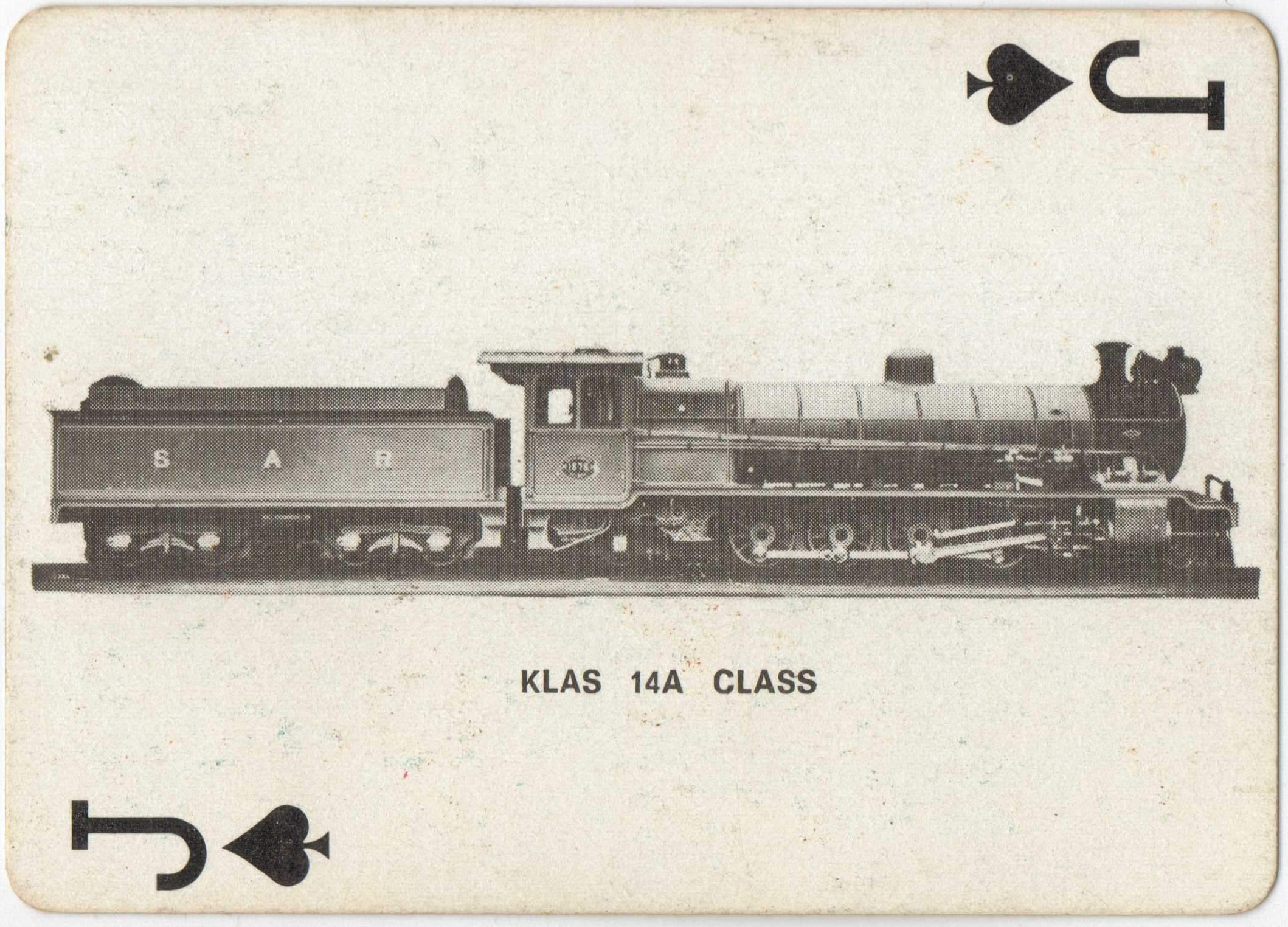
No. 1578, as built with a Belpaire firebox and Type MP1 tender, c. 1914

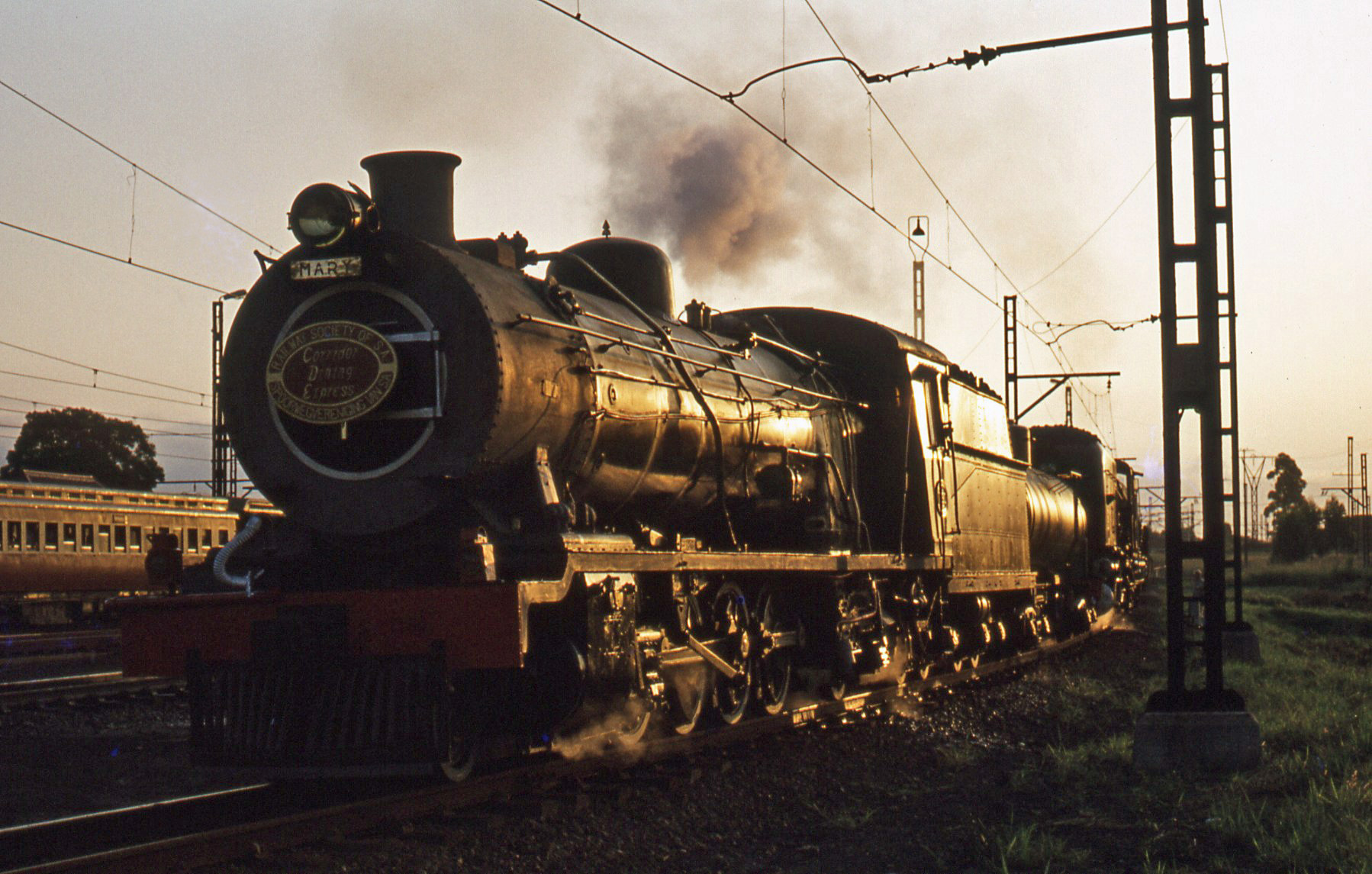
Reboilered no. 1590 Mary with a modified Type MP1 tender, Cato Ridge, 1978

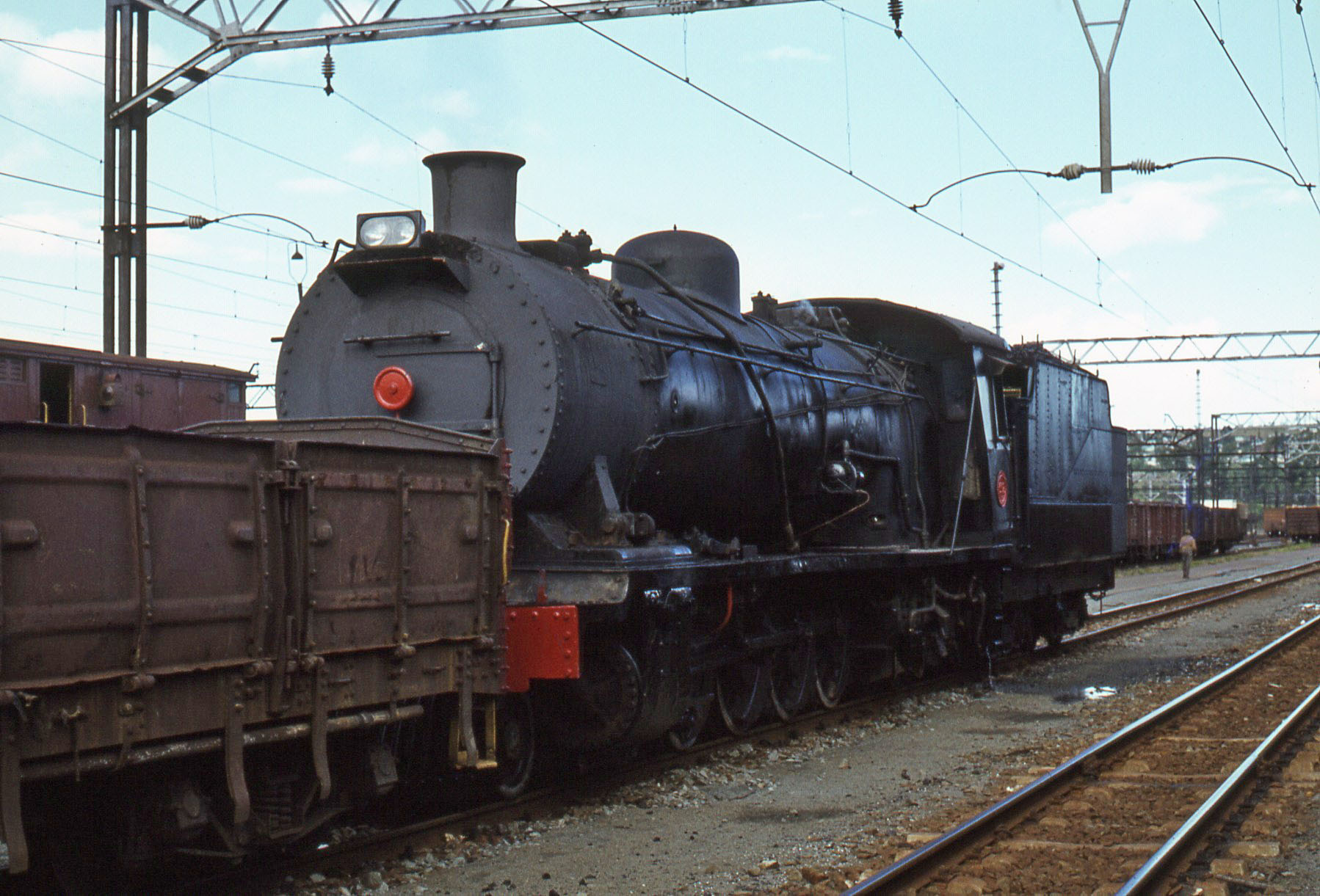
Reboilered no. 1592, Mason's Mill, Pietermaritzburg, 1979

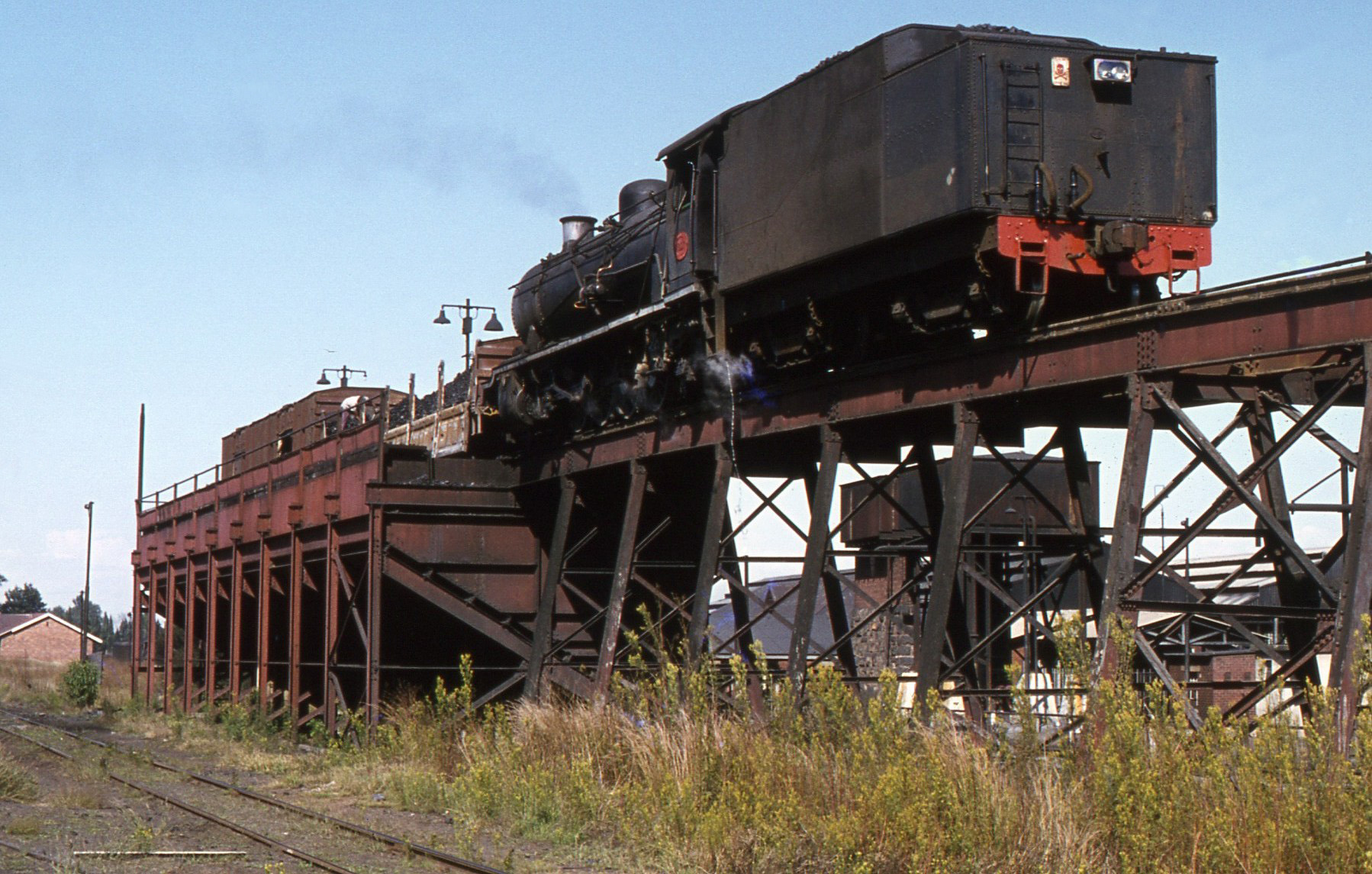
Reboilered no. 1907 with a Type MR tender, Klerksdorp, 1978

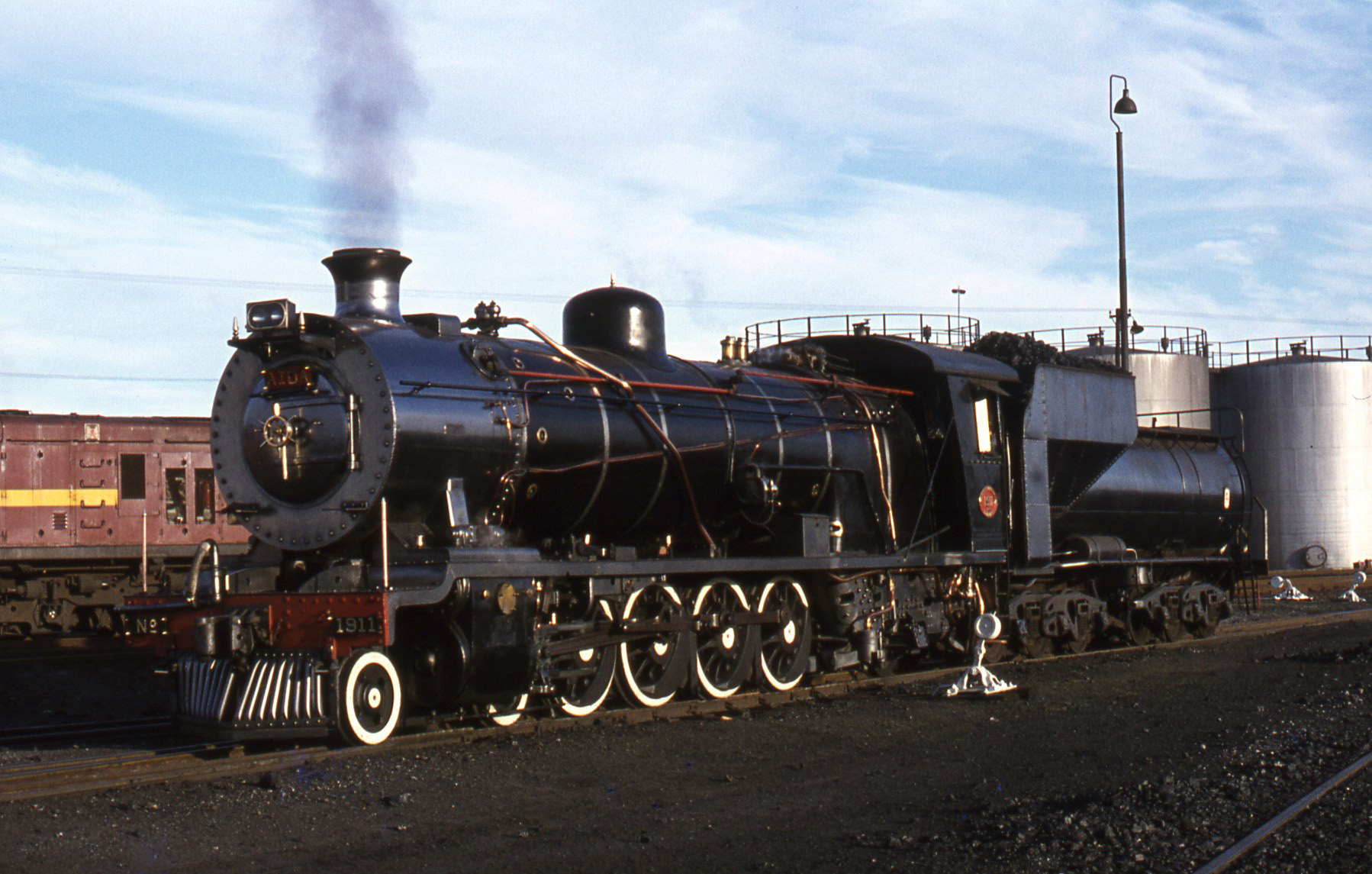
Reboilered no. 1911 with a Type MY tender, De Aar, 1978
