= South African Class 16A 4-6-2 =

1915 design of steam locomotive

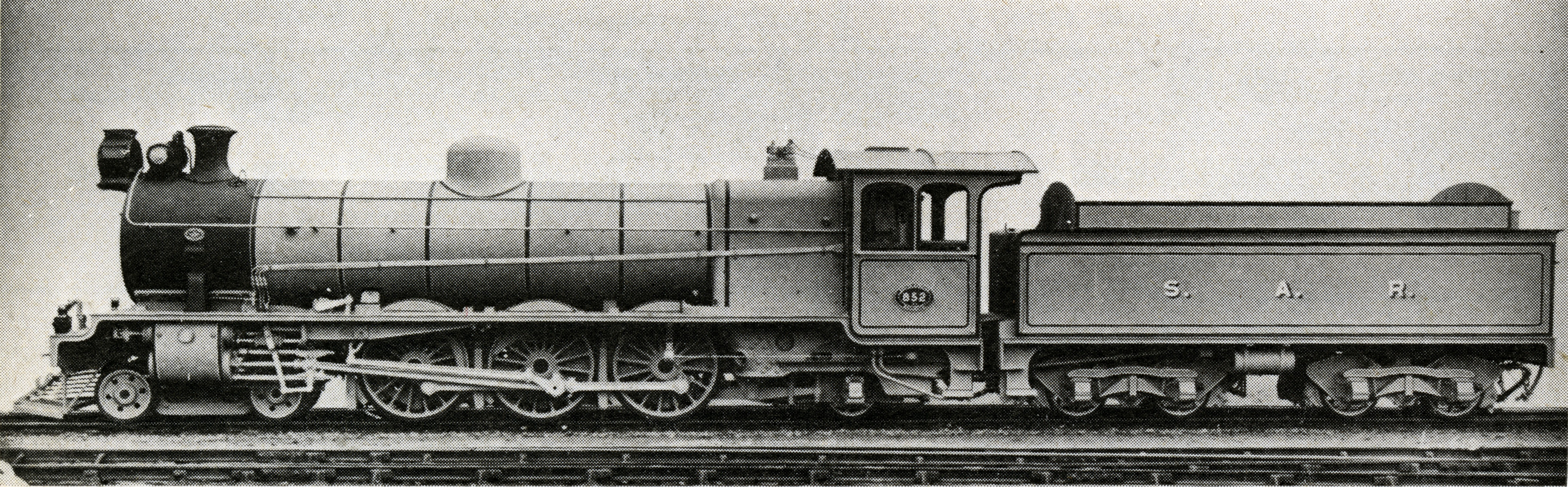
- Builder’s picture of no. 852
Type and origin
- Power type: Steam
- Designer: South African Railways (D.A. Hendrie)
- Builder: North British Locomotive Company
- Serial number: 20956-20957
- Model: Class 16A
- Build date: 1915
- Total produced: 2
Specifications
- Configuration
  - Whyte: 4-6-2 (Pacific)
  - UIC: 2'C1'h4
- Driver: 1st coupled axle (Inner cylinders); 2nd coupled axle (Outer cylinders)
- Gauge: 3 ft 6 in (1,067 mm) Cape gauge
- Leading dia.: 30 in (762 mm)
- Coupled dia.: 60 in (1,524 mm)
- Trailing dia.: 33 in (838 mm)
- Tender wheels: 34 in (864 mm)
- Wheelbase: 57 ft 7 1/4 in (17,558 mm)
  - Engine: 31 ft 1 in (9,474 mm)
  - Leading: 6 ft 2 in (1,880 mm)
  - Coupled: 10 ft 9 in (3,277 mm)
  - Tender: 16 ft 9 in (5,105 mm)
  - Tender bogie: 4 ft 7 in (1,397 mm)
- Length
  - Over couplers: 65 ft 11 5/8 in (20,107 mm)
- Height: 12 ft 10 in (3,912 mm)
- Axle load: 16 LT 18 cwt (17,170 kg)
  - Leading: 16 LT 8 cwt (16,660 kg)
  - Coupled: 16 LT 18 cwt (17,170 kg)
  - Trailing: 14 LT (14,220 kg)
  - Tender bogie: 27 LT 10 cwt (27,940 kg); Bogie 2: 23 LT 11 cwt (23,930 kg)
  - Tender axle: 13 LT 15 cwt (13,970 kg)
- Adhesive weight: 50 LT 14 cwt (51,510 kg)
- Loco weight: 81 LT 2 cwt (82,400 kg)
- Tender weight: 51 LT 1 cwt (51,870 kg)
- Total weight: 132 LT 3 cwt (134,300 kg)
- Tender type: MP1 (2-axle bogies); MP, MP1, MR, MS, MT, MT1, MT2, MX, MY, MY1 permitted
- Fuel type: Coal
- Fuel capacity: 10 LT (10.2 t)
- Water cap.: 4,250 imp gal (19,300 L)
- Firebox
  - Type: Belpaire
  - Grate area: 36 sq ft (3.3 m^{2})
- Boiler
  - Pitch: 7 ft 9 in (2,362 mm)
  - Diameter: 5 ft 1 5/8 in (1,565 mm)
  - Tube plates: 19 ft 9 in (6,020 mm)
  - Small tubes: 119: 2 1/4 in (57 mm)
  - Large tubes: 21: 5 1/2 in (140 mm)
- Boiler pressure: 200 psi (1,379 kPa)
- Safety valve: Ramsbottom
- Heating surface
  - Firebox: 146 sq ft (13.6 m^{2})
  - Tubes: 1,975.5 sq ft (183.53 m^{2})
  - Total surface: 2,121.5 sq ft (197.09 m^{2})
- Superheater
  - Heating area: 459.5 sq ft (42.69 m^{2})
- Cylinders: Four
- Cylinder size: 14 in (356 mm) bore 26 in (660 mm) stroke
- Valve gear: Walschaerts
- Valve type: Piston
- Couplers: Johnston link-and-pin AAR knuckle (1930s)
Performance figures
- Tractive effort: 25,480 lbf (113.3 kN) @ 75%
Career
- Operators: South African Railways
- Class: Class 16A
- Number in class: 2
- Numbers: 851–852
- Delivered: 1915
- First run: 1915
- Withdrawn: 1944
- The 2nd coupled axle had flangeless wheels

The South African Railways Class 16A 4-6-2 of 1915 was a steam locomotive.

In 1915, the South African Railways placed two experimental four-cylinder simple expansion steam locomotives with a 4-6-2 Pacific type wheel arrangement in passenger train service. They were designated Class 16A.

== Manufacturer ==
The Class 16A 4-6-2 Pacific type locomotive was designed by D.A. Hendrie, Chief Mechanical Engineer (CME) of the South African Railways (SAR) from 1910 to 1922, and was built in 1915 by the North British Locomotive Company (NBL) in Glasgow, Scotland. Two locomotives were delivered in November 1915, numbered 851 and 852.

Except that they had four cylinders instead of the usual two, they were identical in most respects to their predecessors, the Class 16, which were delivered by NBL a year earlier. They were also superheated, with Walschaerts valve gear and Belpaire fireboxes, and were also delivered with Type MP1 tenders with a 10 long tons (10.2 tonnes) coal capacity and a 4,250 imperial gallons (19,300 litres) water capacity.

== Four-cylinder experiment ==
With the Class 16A, Hendrie experimented with four-cylinder simple expansion (simplex) steam power. All four cylinders were arranged in line below the smokebox. The Walschaerts valve gear had rocker arms attached to the tail ends of the outer piston valves which passed through the frames and then actuated the adjacent inner piston's valves. It operated in the simplex configuration, whereby steam is fed directly to all four cylinders and spent steam is exhausted by all cylinders directly through the smokebox and up the chimney.

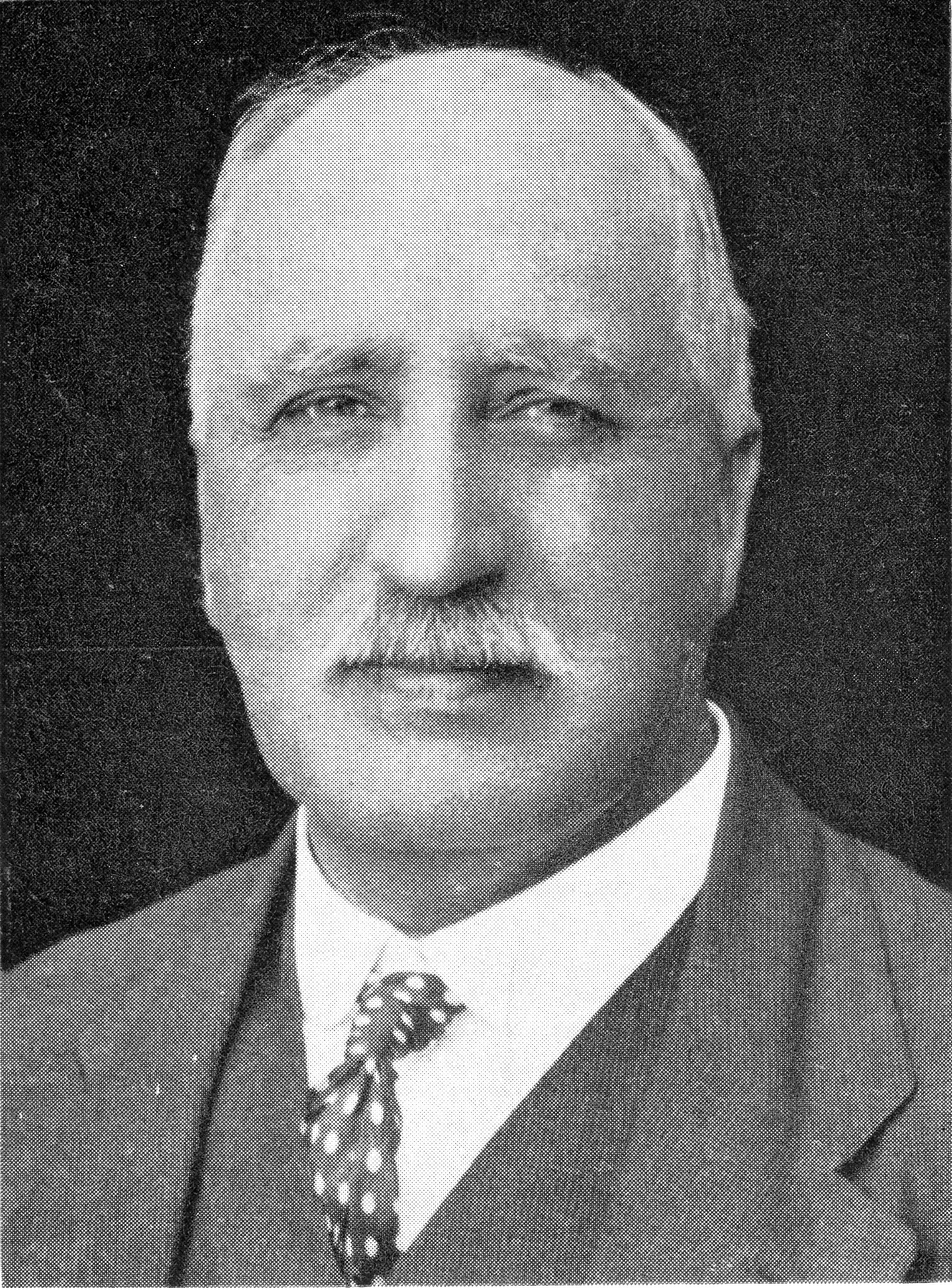
D.A. Hendrie

All four cylinders were the same size, with a 14 inches (356 millimetres) bore and 26 inches (660 millimetres) stroke, which presented a number of problems which had to be overcome to arrange two of these in the limited space between the frames. The outer cylinders drove the centre pair of coupled wheels, while the inner cylinders operated on a cranked leading coupled wheel axle. Each inside crank was arranged at an angle of 180 degrees with its adjacent outside crank.

The arrangement made for a very smooth-running locomotive capable of very fast running since the shouldering effect which occurs on two-cylinder locomotives was completely absent. They were very popular with their crews because of their smooth and steady running.

They did, however, have less tractive effort than the two-cylinder Class 16. Even though the Class 16A experiment was successful, the available space on a Cape gauge locomotive for four equal-sized in-line cylinders would prevent larger diameter cylinders from being fitted and the four-cylinder design was therefore never repeated by the SAR.

== Service ==
The two locomotives were placed in service on the Reef where they operated with reasonable success. Their biggest disadvantage was the difficult access to the inner cylinders. The last of these locomotives was withdrawn from service and scrapped during 1944.

== Illustration ==
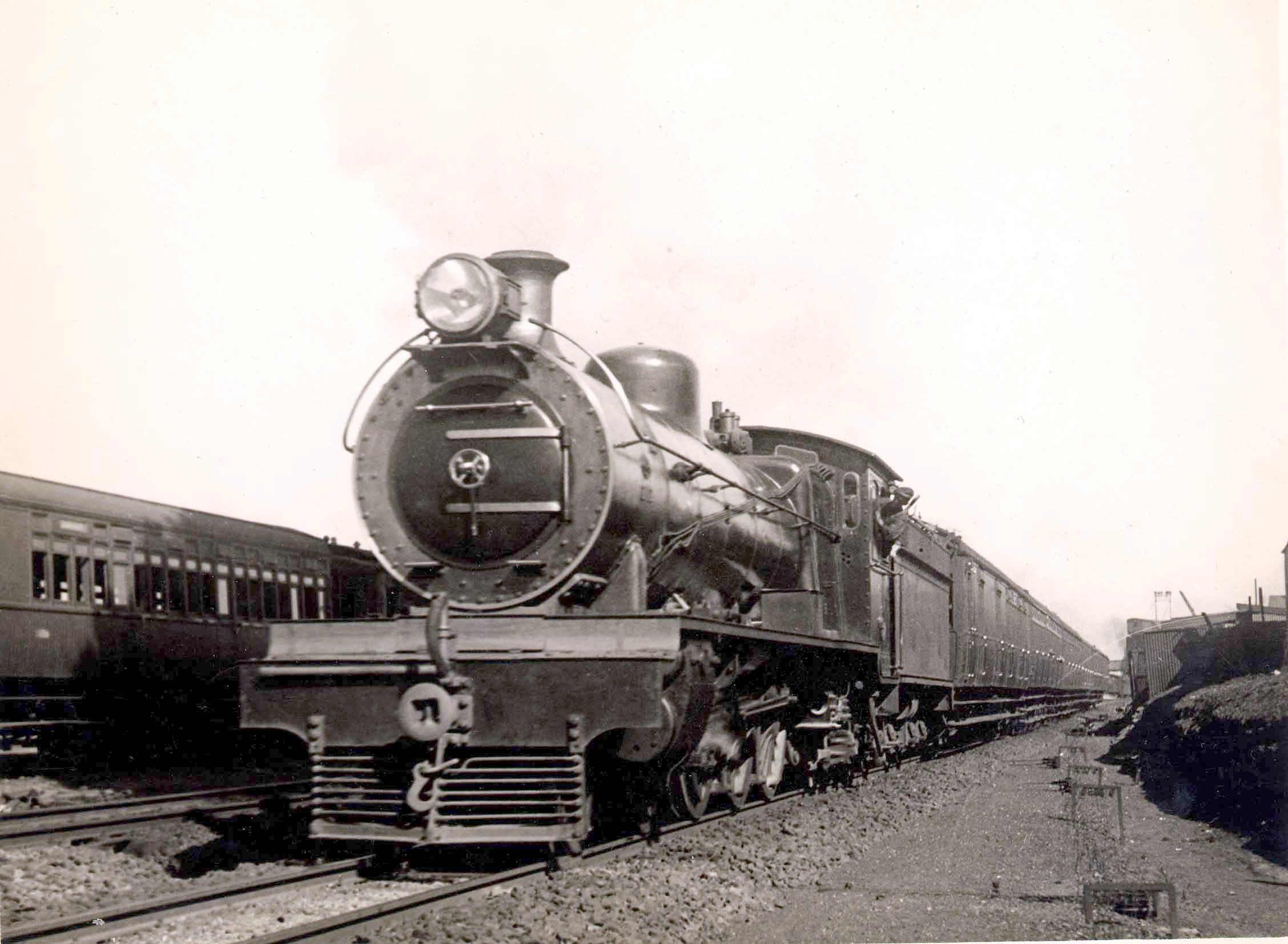
No. 852 on train no. 75 departing Braamfontein in June 1936
