= South African type MP1 tender =

Steam locomotive tender in South Africa

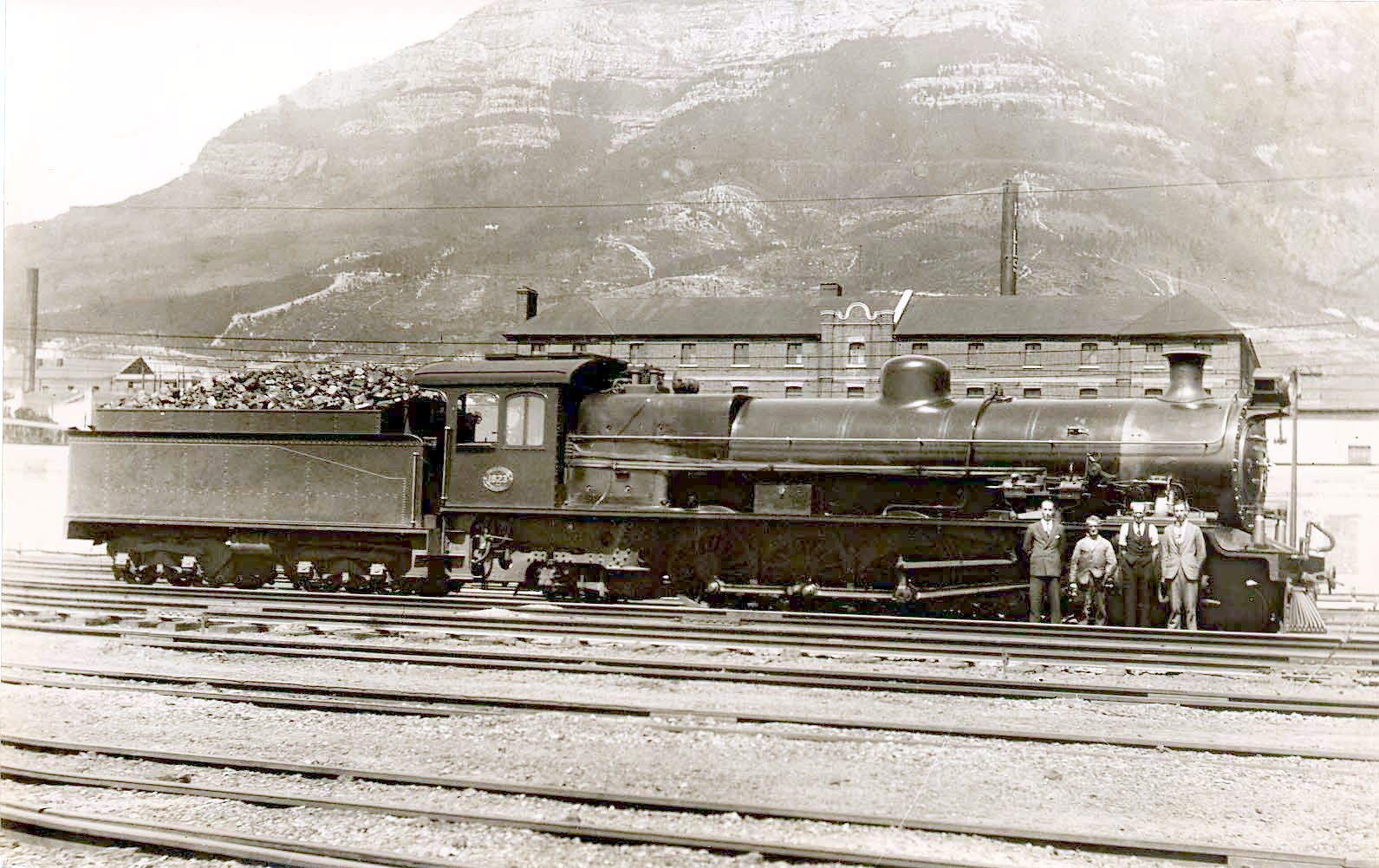
- Type MP1 tender on SAR Class 15A, c. 1930
Type and origin
- Locomotive: Class 12, Class 12A, Class 12B, Class 14, Class 14A, Class 14B, Class 15, Class 15A, Class 16, Class 16A, Class 16B, Class 16C, Class 20, Class MC1, Class MH, Class MJ
- Designer: South African Railways (D.A. Hendrie)
- Builder: Baldwin Locomotive Works; Beyer, Peacock & Company; Henschel & Son; JA Maffei; North British Locomotive Company; Robert Stephenson & Company; Vulcan Foundry
- In service: 1912-1925
- Rebuilder: South African Railways
- Rebuild date: c. 1930
- Rebuilt to: Type MR, Type XP1
Specifications
- Configuration: 2-axle bogies
- Gauge: 3 ft 6 in (1,067 mm) Cape gauge
- Length: 25 ft 10 3/8 in (7,884 mm) no. 1494-1519, 1746-1760; 25 ft 10 3/4 in (7,893 mm) all others
- Wheel dia.: 34 in (864 mm)
- Wheelbase: 16 ft 9 in (5,105 mm)
  - Bogie: 4 ft 7 in (1,397 mm)
- Axle load: 13 LT 15 cwt (13,970 kg)
  - Front bogie: 27 LT 10 cwt (27,940 kg)
  - Rear bogie: 23 LT 11 cwt (23,930 kg)
- Weight empty: 49,452 lb (22,431 kg)
- Weight w/o: 51 LT 1 cwt (51,870 kg)
- Fuel type: Coal
- Fuel cap.: 10 LT (10.2 t)
- Water cap.: 4,250 imp gal (19,300 L)
- Stoking: Manual
- Couplers: Drawbar & Johnston link-and-pin Drawbar & AAR knuckle (1930s)
Career
- Operators: South African Railways
- Numbers: SAR 790-841, 851-852, 1494-1550, 1561-1595, 1634-1648, 1651-1665, 1674-1681, 1701-1760, 1781-1828, 1839-1878, 1901-1921, 1931-1970, 2011-2025, 2080-2100, 2103-2138

The South African type MP1 tender was a steam locomotive tender.

The Type MP1 tender first entered service in 1912, as tenders to the Class 12 4-8-2 Mountain type steam locomotives which were acquired by the South African Railways in that year.

== Manufacturers ==
Type MP1 tenders were built between 1912 and 1925 by Baldwin Locomotive Works, Beyer, Peacock & Company, Henschel & Son, JA Maffei, North British Locomotive Company, Robert Stephenson & Company and Vulcan Foundry.

The South African Railways (SAR) placed 46 Class 12 Mountain type locomotives in service between 1912 and 1921. The locomotive and tender were designed by D.A. Hendrie, who had been appointed as the first Chief Mechanical Engineer of the SAR upon its inception in 1910. The Class 12 was the first locomotive design to originate from the newly established SAR and was acquired to haul coal between Germiston and Witbank. The Type MP1 first entered service as tenders to these locomotives.

== Characteristics ==
The Type MP1 was the first of a standard tender type which, by fitting an engine drawbar to suit the class of engine to which it is coupled, was eventually to be used on all the Hendrie-designed locomotives. The tender had a coal capacity of 10 long tons (10.2 tonnes), a water capacity of 4,250 imperial gallons (19,300 litres) and a maximum axle load of 13 long tons 15 hundredweight (13,970 kilograms).

== Locomotives ==
Sixteen locomotive classes, built by seven manufacturers, were delivered new with Type MP1 tenders, which were numbered for their engines in the number ranges as shown. An oval number plate, bearing the engine number and often also the tender type, was attached to the rear end of the tender.

- 1912: Class 12, numbers 1494 to 1519 and 1859 to 1878.
- 1913: Class 14, numbers 1701 to 1745.
- 1913: Class MC1, numbers 1634 to 1648.
- 1914: Class 14A, numbers 1576 to 1595 and 1901 to 1921.
- 1914: Class 14B, numbers 1746 to 1760.
- 1914: Class 15, numbers 1561 to 1570.
- 1914: Class 15A, numbers 1571 to 1575, 1781 to 1828, 1839 to 1858, 1961 to 1970, 2011 to 2025 and 2080 to 2100.

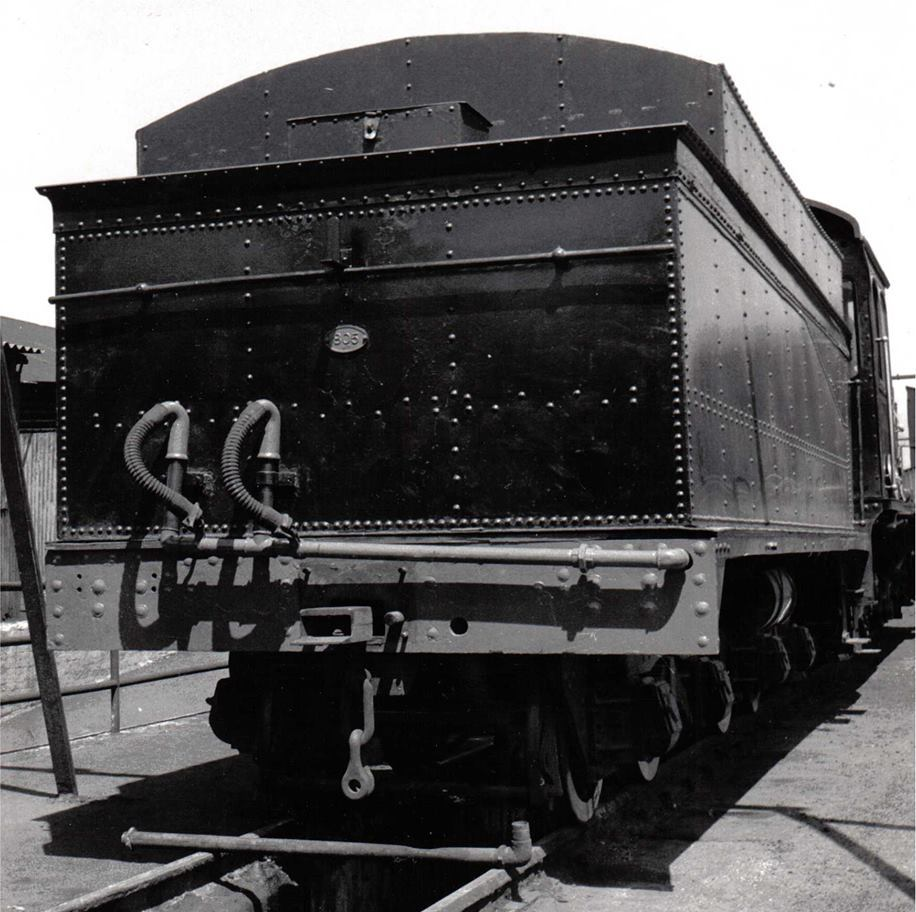
Number plate on tender no. 805

- 1914: Class 16, numbers 790 to 801.
- 1914: Class MJ, numbers 1651 to 1660 and 1674 to 1681.
- 1915: Class 16A, numbers 851 and 852.
- 1915: Class MH, numbers 1661 to 1665.
- 1917: Class 16B, numbers 802 to 811.
- 1919: Class 12A, numbers 1520 to 1550 and 2103 to 2138.
- 1919: Class 16C, numbers 812 to 841.
- 1920: Class 12B, numbers 1931 to 1960.
- 1935: Class 20, with an inherited tender.

== Classification letters ==
Since many tender types are interchangeable between different locomotive classes and types, a tender classification system was adopted by the SAR. The first letter of the tender type indicates the classes of engines to which it could be coupled. The "M_" tenders could be used with the locomotive classes as shown, although engine drawbars and intermediate emergency chains had to be replaced or adjusted to suit the target locomotive in some cases.

- Class 12, Class 12A and Class 12B.
- Class 14, Class 14A and Class 14B.
- Class 15 and Class 15A.
- Class 16, Class 16A, Class 16B and Class 16C.
- Class 19, Class 19A, Class 19B, Class 19C and Class 19D.
- Class 20.
- Class 24.
- Class MC1, Class MH and Class MJ.
- Class S2.

The second letter indicates the tender's water capacity. The "_P" tenders had a capacity of 4,250 imperial gallons (19,300 litres; 5,100 US gallons).

A number, when added after the letter code, indicates differences between similar tender types, such as function, wheelbase or coal bunker capacity.

== Modifications and rebuilding ==
=== Modifications ===
Most of these tenders were modified by shortening and raising the sides of the coal bunker, in effect making the coal at the rear of the bunker more easily accessible to the stoker and apparently without affecting the tender's coal capacity.

=== Reclassification to Type XP1 ===
At some stage, probably after its engine was withdrawn from service c. 1937, the intermediate draw and buffing gear of Type MP1 tender no. 1634, off a Class MC1 Mallet locomotive, was altered to suit Class 10 4-6-2 Pacific no. 746. This modification converted no. 1634, which was also modified by shortening and raising the sides of the coal bunker, to the sole Type XP1 tender.

=== Rebuilding to Type MR ===
During the 1930s, some of the Type MP1 tenders were rebuilt by the SAR by mounting a completely new upper structure on the existing underframe. The modification was done to drawings approved by Chief Mechanical Engineer A.G. Watson in 1929, in respect of Type MP1 tenders of the Classes 12, 12A, 12B, 14, 14A, 14B, 15, 15A, 16, 16A, 16B and 16C. These rebuilt tenders had a more modern appearance, with flush sides all the way to the top of the self-trimming coal bunker. The new tank increased the water capacity from 4,250 to 4,600 imperial gallons (19,300 to 20,900 litres) and these rebuilt tenders were therefore reclassified to Type MR.

== Illustration ==
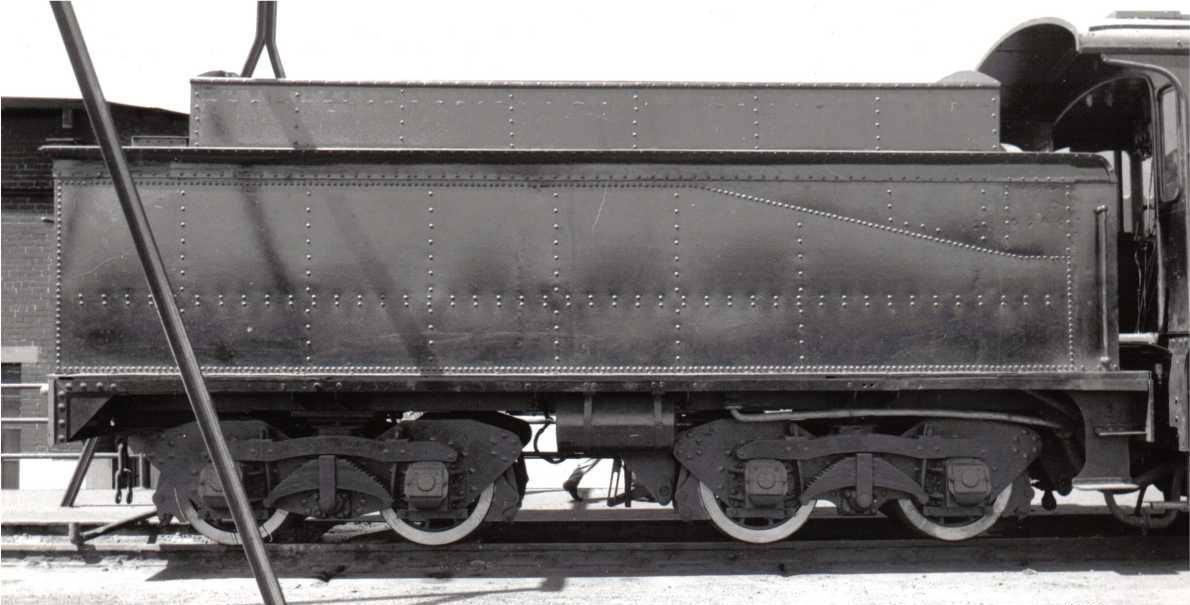
Type MP1 no. 805 as built, off Class 16B, c. 1990

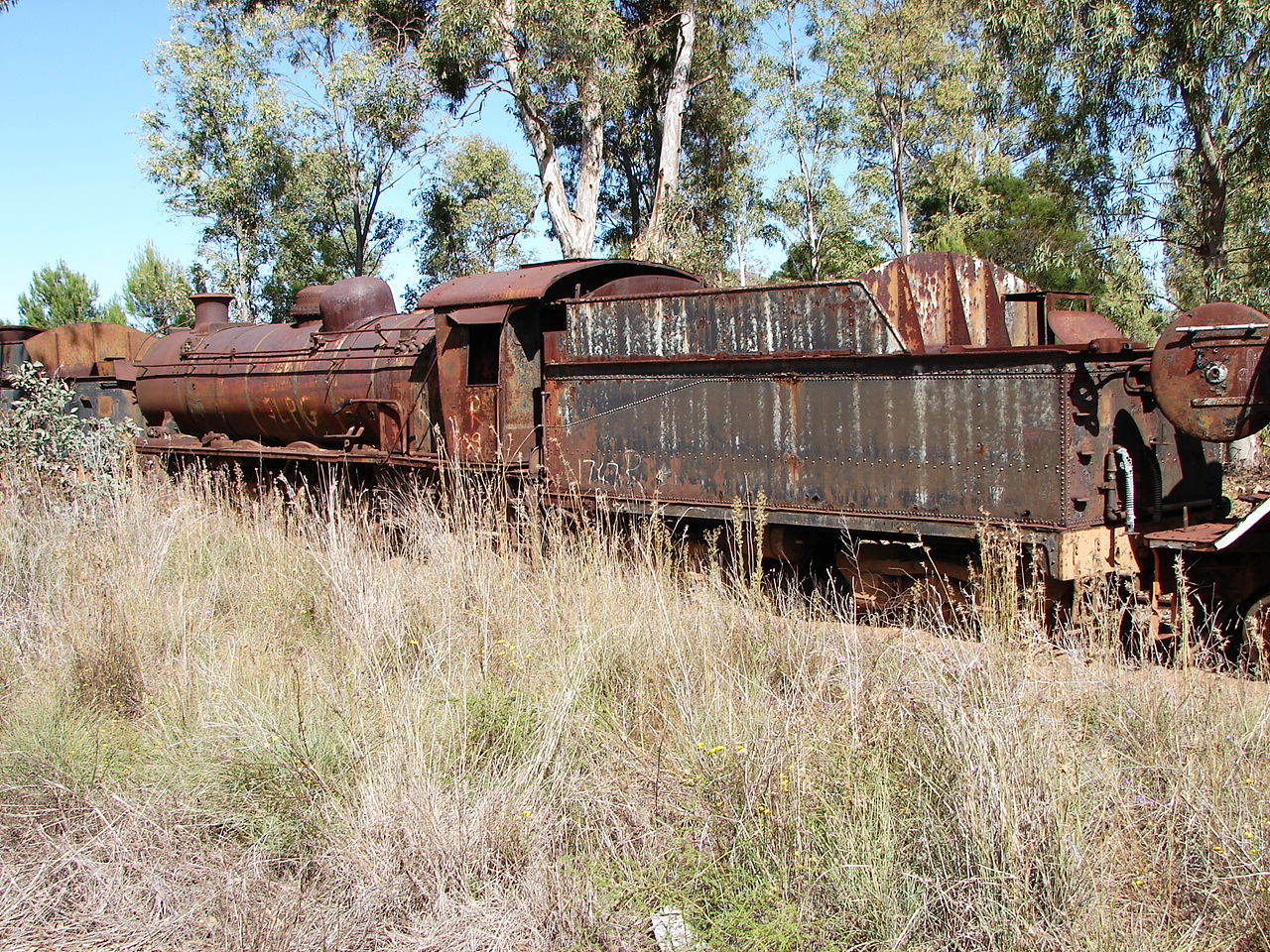
Modified Type MP1 on Class 16CR, 2013

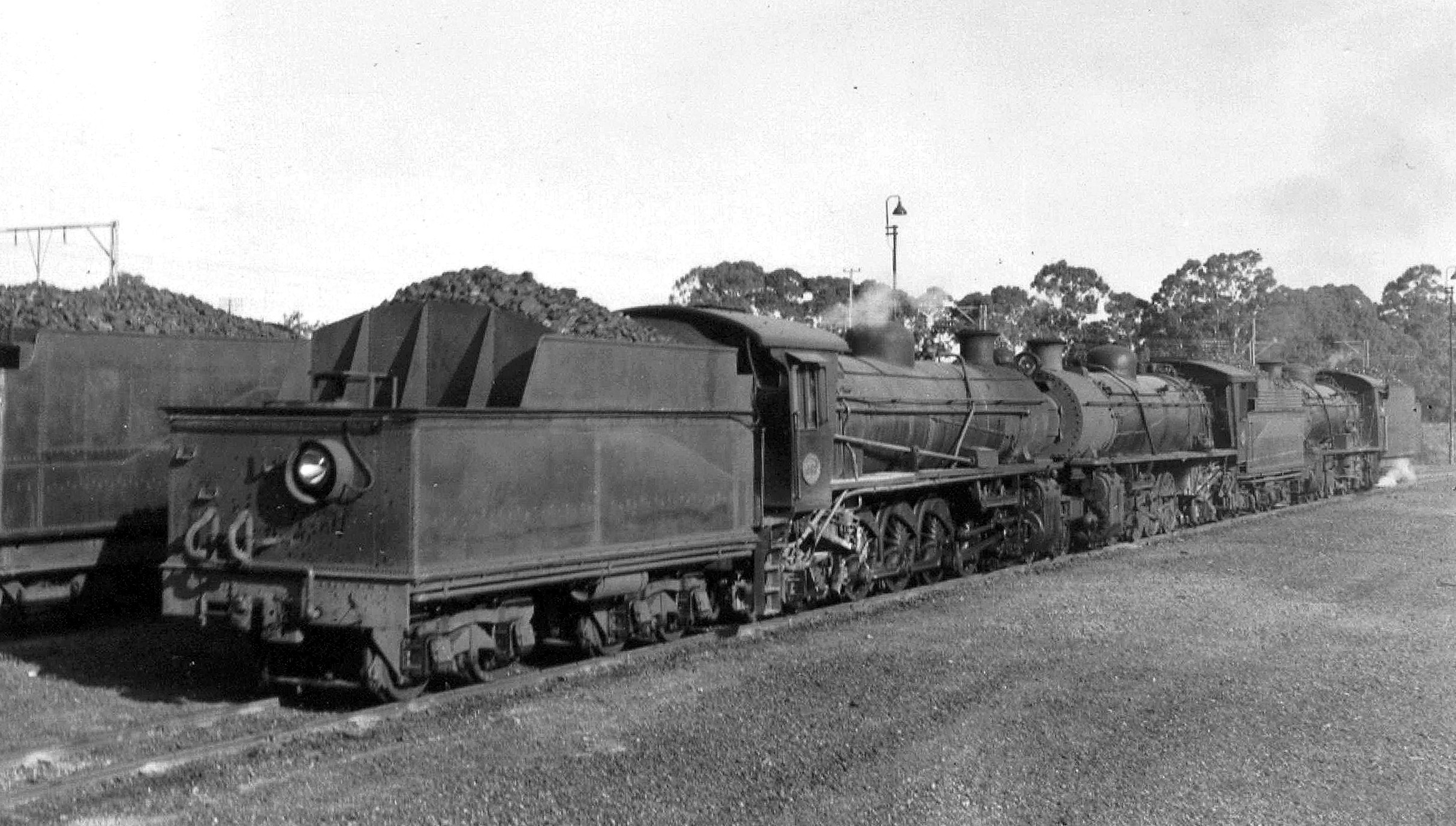
Modified and reclassified Type XP1 no. 1634 on Class 4AR, c. 1961

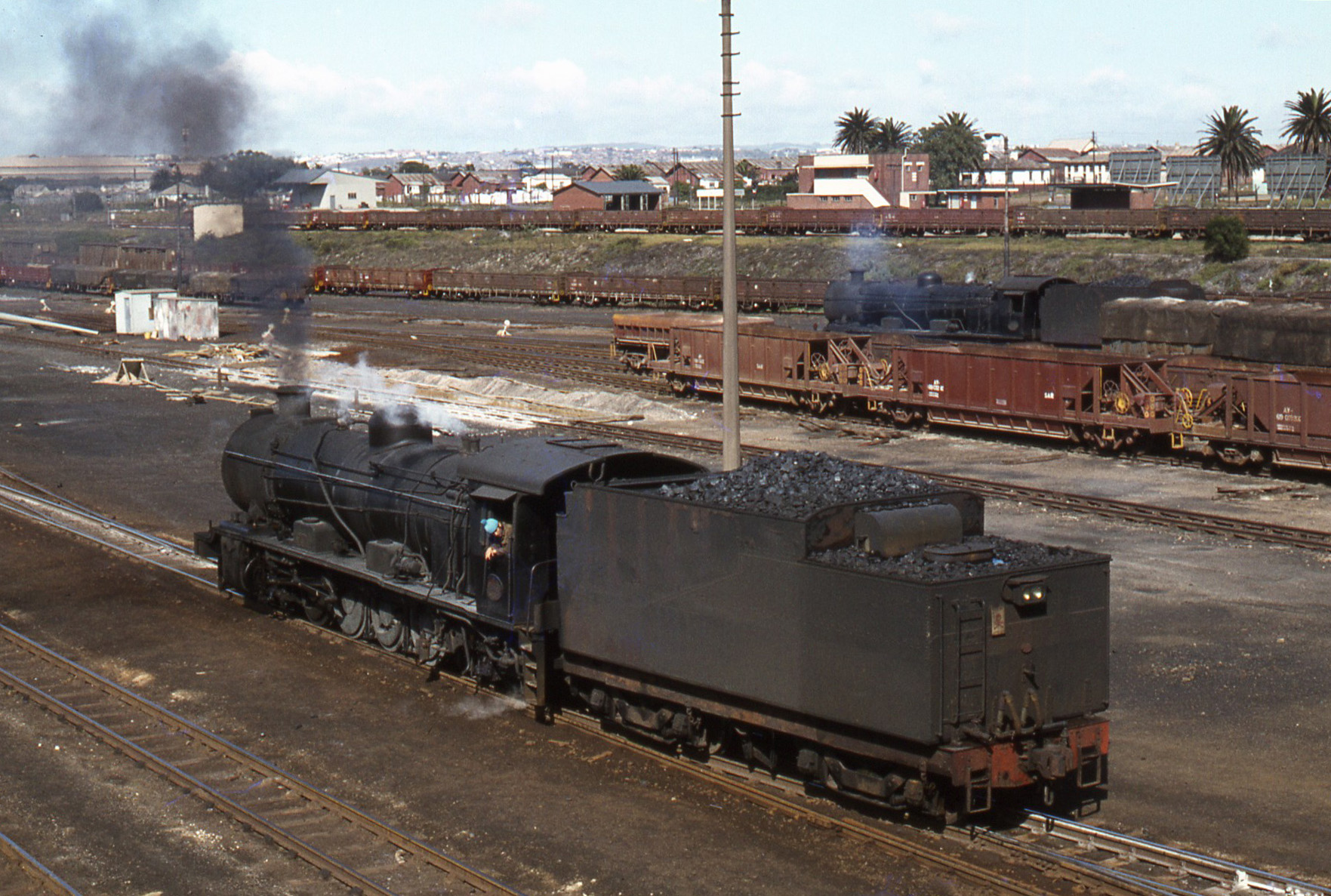
Rebuilt and reclassified Type MR on Class 12R, 1979
