= South African Class MJ 2-6-6-0 =

1914 articulated steam locomotive

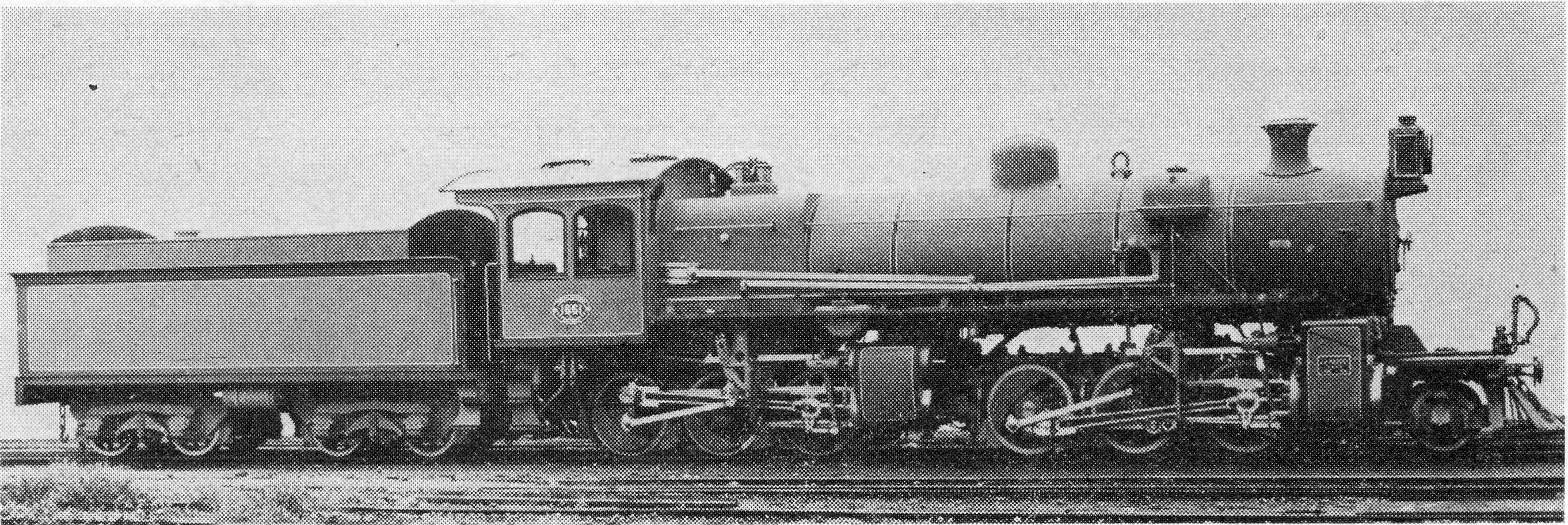
- SAR Class MJ no. 1651, c. 1914
Type and origin
- ♠ Locomotive as built – ♥ Reboilered locomotive
- Power type: Steam
- Designer: South African Railways (D.A. Hendrie)
- Builder: Maffei; North British Locomotive Company
- Order number: NBL L657
- Serial number: Maffei 3452-3461; NBL 21248-21255
- Model: SAR Class MJ
- Build date: 1914
- Total produced: 18
Specifications
- Configuration
  - Whyte: 2-6-6-0 (Denver)
  - UIC: (1'C)Chv4
- Driver: 3rd & 6th coupled axles
- Gauge: 3 ft 6 in (1,067 mm) Cape gauge
- Leading dia.: 28 1/2 in (724 mm)
- Coupled dia.: 42 3/4 in (1,086 mm)
- Tender wheels: 34 in (864 mm)
- Wheelbase: 58 ft 11 1/4 in (17,964 mm)
  - Engine: 32 ft 8 in (9,957 mm)
  - Coupled: 8 ft 4 in (2,540 mm) per unit
  - Tender: 16 ft 9 in (5,105 mm)
  - Tender bogie: 4 ft 7 in (1,397 mm)
- Length
  - Over couplers: 67 ft 5 1/8 in (20,552 mm)
- Height: ♠♥ 12 ft 6 1/8 in (3,813 mm)
- Frame type: Bar
- Axle load: ♠ 13 LT 15 cwt (13,970 kg)
  - Leading: ♠ 7 LT 17 cwt (7,976 kg)
  - 1st coupled: ♠ 12 LT 12 cwt (12,800 kg)
  - 2nd coupled: ♠ 12 LT 13 cwt (12,850 kg)
  - 3rd coupled: ♠ 12 LT 19 cwt (13,160 kg)
  - 4th coupled: ♠ 11 LT 8 cwt (11,580 kg)
  - 5th coupled: ♠ 12 LT 16 cwt (13,010 kg)
  - 6th coupled: ♠ 13 LT 15 cwt (13,970 kg)
  - Tender bogie: Bogie 1: 27 LT 10 cwt (27,940 kg); Bogie 2: 23 LT 11 cwt (23,930 kg)
  - Tender axle: 13 LT 15 cwt (13,970 kg)
- Adhesive weight: ♠ 76 LT 3 cwt (77,370 kg)
- Loco weight: ♠ 84 LT (85,350 kg)
- Tender weight: 51 LT 1 cwt (51,870 kg)
- Total weight: ♠ 135 LT 1 cwt (137,200 kg)
- Tender type: MP1 (2-axle bogies); MP, MP1, MR permitted
- Fuel type: Coal
- Fuel capacity: 10 LT (10.2 t)
- Water cap.: 4,250 imp gal (19,300 L)
- Firebox
  - Type: ♠♥ Belpaire
  - Grate area: ♠♥ 40 sq ft (3.7 m^{2})
- Boiler
  - Pitch: ♠♥ 7 ft 9 1/8 in (2,365 mm)
  - Diameter: ♠♥ 5 ft 1 1/2 in (1,562 mm)
  - Tube plates: ♠ 17 ft (5,182 mm) ♥ 17 ft 1/4 in (5,188 mm)
  - Small tubes: ♠♥ 151: 2 in (51 mm)
  - Large tubes: ♠♥ 18 5 1/2 in (140 mm)
- Boiler pressure: ♠♥ 200 psi (1,379 kPa)
- Safety valve: Ramsbottom
- Heating surface
  - Firebox: ♠ 130 sq ft (12 m^{2}) ♥ 133 sq ft (12.4 m^{2})
  - Tubes: ♠ 1,783 sq ft (165.6 m^{2}) ♥ 1,780 sq ft (165 m^{2})
  - Total surface: ♠♥ 1,913 sq ft (177.7 m^{2})
- Superheater
  - Type: Schmidt
  - Heating area: ♠ 343 sq ft (31.9 m^{2}) ♥ 350 sq ft (33 m^{2})
- Cylinders: Four
- High-pressure cylinder: 16 1/2 in (419 mm) bore 24 in (610 mm) stroke
- Low-pressure cylinder: 26 in (660 mm) bore 24 in (610 mm) stroke
- Valve gear: Walschaerts
- Valve type: Piston
- Couplers: Johnston link-and-pin AAR knuckle (1930s)
Performance figures
- Tractive effort: ♠ 38,170 lbf (169.8 kN) @ 50% ♥ 37,950 lbf (168.8 kN) @ 50%
Career
- Operators: South African Railways
- Class: Class MJ
- Number in class: 18
- Numbers: 1651–1660, 1674–1681
- Delivered: 1914–1921
- First run: 1914
- Scrapped: 1962

The South African Railways Class MJ 2-6-6-0 of 1914 was a class of articulated steam locomotives.

Between 1914 and 1921, the South African Railways placed eighteen Class MJ Mallet articulated compound steam locomotives with a 2-6-6-0 wheel arrangement in branch line service.

== Manufacturers ==
The Class MJ 2-6-6-0 Mallet articulated compound steam locomotive was designed by D.A. Hendrie, Chief Mechanical Engineer (CME) of the South African Railways (SAR) from 1910 to 1922, to meet the need for engines with a higher tractive effort to cope with heavy traffic on branch lines.

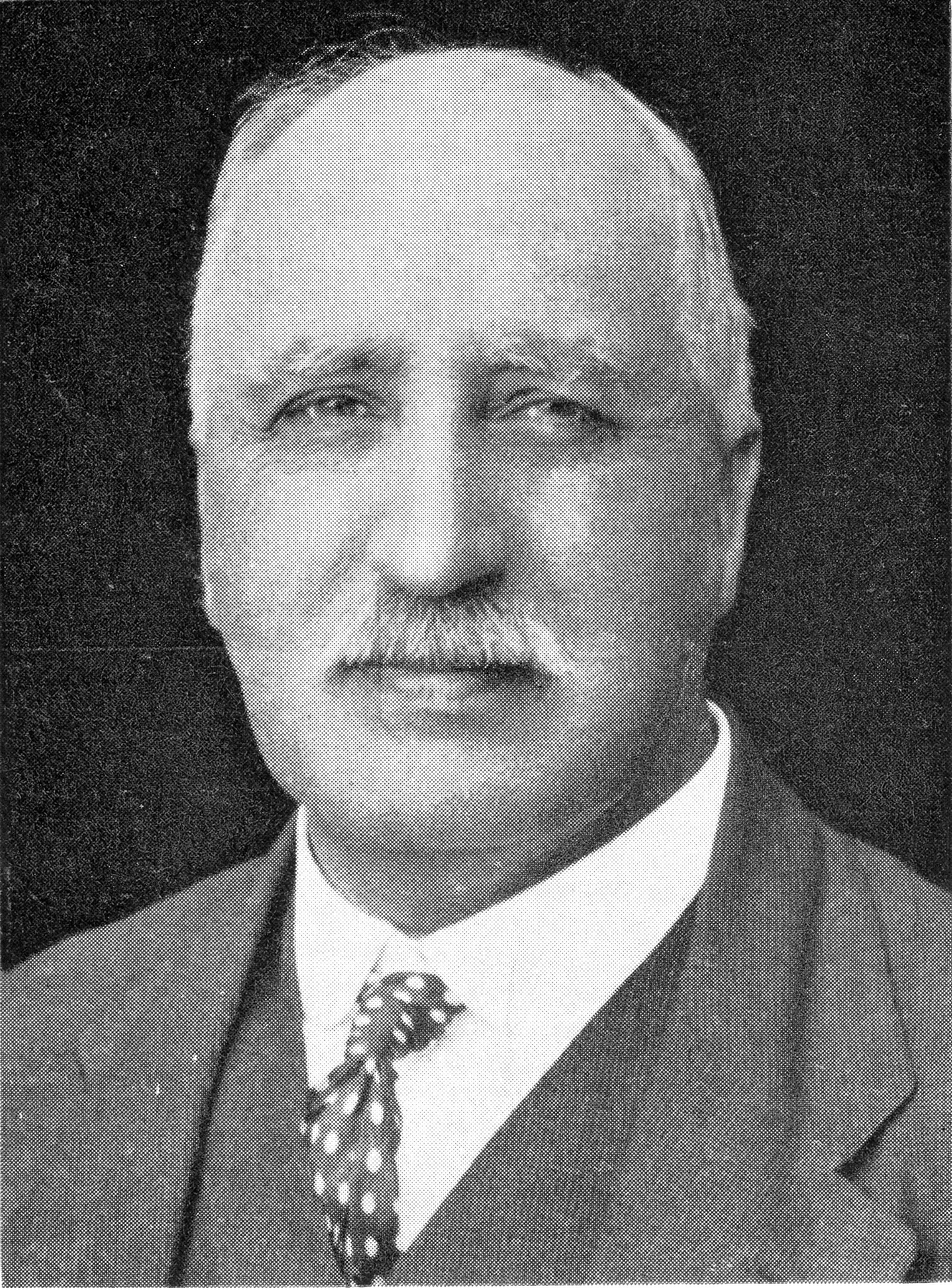
D.A. Hendrie

Ten of these branch line locomotives were ordered from Maffei of Munich but, as a result of the outbreak of the First World War, only two could be delivered from Germany in 1914, numbered 1651 and 1652.

The order for the remaining eight was then transferred to the North British Locomotive Company (NBL) in Scotland, who delivered them in 1917 and 1918, numbered in the range from 1653 to 1660. The entry for the Mallets in the NBL works register shows them as ordered on 20 April 1915 and delivered from February to March 2016. Those dates are probably ex works dates rather than actual delivery dates.

After cessation of hostilities in 1918, Maffei approached the SAR and requested that the balance of the original order, which had been built in 1914 but could not be delivered because of the war, also be accepted. These eight locomotives were delivered in 1921, numbered in the range from 1674 to 1681.

== Characteristics ==
The locomotives had Walschaerts valve gear and were superheated, using the Schmidt type superheater. Unlike most of the other SAR Mallet classes, which had round-topped fireboxes, the Class MJ had Belpaire fireboxes. The four cylinders were arranged outside the 4 inches (102 millimetres) thick bar frames.

The locomotives were delivered with Type MP1 tenders with a coal capacity of 10 long tons (10.2 tonnes) and a water capacity of 4,250 imperial gallons (19,300 litres). The same tender was used by altogether fifteen other SAR locomotive Classes.

== Reboilering ==
During 1939, while W.A.J. Day was the CME of the SAR, the Classes MJ and MJ1 were modified slightly to be reboilered with the same standard boiler, once again with Belpaire fireboxes.

== Service ==
With its light axle loading, the Class MJ was intended for branch line working. Most of them were placed in service in the Eastern Cape, but four went to Natal and are believed to have worked on the Eshowe branch line. They gave satisfactory service on the Cape Eastern System where the moderate speeds required on the sections over which they worked enabled them to give reasonably good results.

Two of the locomotives, NBL-built no. 1655 and Maffei-built no. 1674, had the distinction of being the last two Mallet engines to remain in SAR service. They were scrapped in the East London workshops in 1962, after having worked on the branch line between Amabele and Umtata in Transkei for most of their service lives and then having spent their last years in shunting service in East London.

== Works numbers ==
The known works numbers for the eight NBL-built locomotives are recorded as 21248 to 21255. However, these numbers are in conflict with the NBL works numbers 21246 to 21275 which were allocated to thirty 2-8-2T locomotives, numbered 5381 to 5410 and built by NBL for the Paris-Orleans Railway in France. Preceding and following NBL works numbers that are also in conflict with those recorded for the French locomotives are:

- Works numbers 21246 and 21247 of the last two of six 45-class 0-6-2T locomotives built for the Glasgow and South Western Railway in January 1916.
- Works numbers 21256 to 21275 of twenty named Prince of Wales class 4-6-0 locomotives built for the London and North Western Railway between October 1915 and January 1916.

In the official NBL builders list, the Paris-Orleans 2-8-2Ts are shown as ordered in September 1915 and delivered from March to June 1916. Their duplicated works numbers are listed as "progressive numbers" 21246A to 21275A.

The builders, works numbers, years of entering service and engine numbers of the Class MJ are listed in the table.

SAR Class MJ 2-6-6-0 of 1914
Builder	Works no.	Year	SAR no.
Maffei	3452	1914	1651
Maffei	3453	1914	1652
NBL	21248	1917	1653
NBL	21249	1917	1654
NBL	21250	1917	1655
NBL	21251	1917	1656
NBL	21252	1917	1657
NBL	21253	1917	1658
NBL	21254	1917	1659
NBL	21255	1917	1660
Maffei	3454	1921	1674
Maffei	3455	1921	1675
Maffei	3456	1921	1676
Maffei	3457	1921	1677
Maffei	3458	1921	1678
Maffei	3459	1921	1679
Maffei	3460	1921	1680
Maffei	3461	1921	1681
