= South African Class MC1 2-6-6-0 =

1914 articulated steam locomotive

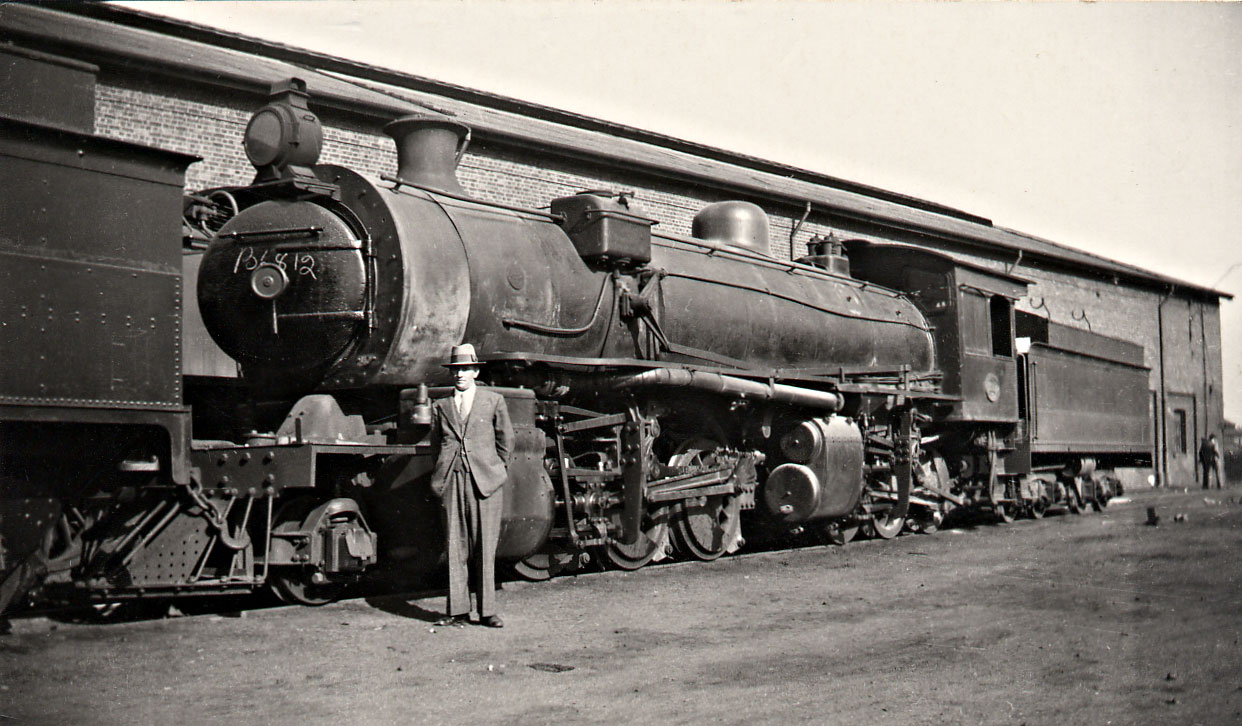
- SAR Class MC1 with engine driver Mr. Kok, c. 1930
Type and origin
- Power type: Steam
- Designer: North British Locomotive Company
- Builder: North British Locomotive Company
- Serial number: 20442–20456
- Build date: 1913–1914
- Total produced: 15
Specifications
- Configuration
  - Whyte: 2-6-6-0 (Denver)
  - UIC: (1'C)Chv4
- Driver: 3rd & 6th coupled axles
- Gauge: 3 ft 6 in (1,067 mm) Cape gauge
- Leading dia.: 28 1/2 in (724 mm)
- Coupled dia.: 45 1/2 in (1,156 mm)
- Tender wheels: 34 in (864 mm)
- Wheelbase: 60 ft (18,288 mm)
  - Engine: 33 ft 5 in (10,185 mm)
  - Coupled: 8 ft 4 in (2,540 mm) per unit
  - Tender: 16 ft 9 in (5,105 mm)
  - Tender bogie: 4 ft 7 in (1,397 mm)
- Length
  - Over couplers: 68 ft 5 1/8 in (20,857 mm)
- Height: 12 ft 5 3/16 in (3,789 mm)
- Axle load: 16 LT 4 cwt (16,460 kg)
  - Leading: 7 LT 19 cwt (8,078 kg)
  - 1st coupled: 13 LT 16 cwt (14,020 kg)
  - 2nd coupled: 15 LT 3 cwt (15,390 kg)
  - 3rd coupled: 15 LT 7 cwt (15,600 kg)
  - 4th coupled: 14 LT 19 cwt (15,190 kg)
  - 5th coupled: 14 LT 10 cwt (14,730 kg)
  - 6th coupled: 16 LT 4 cwt (16,460 kg)
  - Tender bogie: Bogie 1: 27 LT 10 cwt (27,940 kg); Bogie 2: 23 LT 11 cwt (23,930 kg)
  - Tender axle: 13 LT 15 cwt (13,970 kg)
- Adhesive weight: 89 LT 19 cwt (91,390 kg)
- Loco weight: 97 LT 18 cwt (99,470 kg)
- Tender weight: 51 LT 1 cwt (51,870 kg)
- Total weight: 148 LT 19 cwt (151,300 kg)
- Tender type: MP1 (2-axle bogies)
- Fuel type: Coal
- Fuel capacity: 10 LT (10.2 t)
- Water cap.: 4,250 imp gal (19,300 L)
- Firebox
  - Type: Round-top
  - Grate area: 42.5 sq ft (3.95 m^{2})
- Boiler
  - Pitch: 7 ft 6 in (2,286 mm)
  - Diameter: 5 ft 8 in (1,727 mm)
  - Tube plates: 16 ft 2 3/4 in (4,947 mm)
  - Small tubes: 152: 2 1/4 in (57 mm)
  - Large tubes: 27: 5 3/8 in (137 mm)
- Boiler pressure: 200 psi (1,379 kPa)
- Safety valve: Ramsbottom
- Heating surface
  - Firebox: 154 sq ft (14.3 m^{2})
  - Tubes: 2,060 sq ft (191 m^{2})
  - Total surface: 2,214 sq ft (205.7 m^{2})
- Superheater
  - Heating area: 580 sq ft (54 m^{2})
- Cylinders: Four
- High-pressure cylinder: 18 in (457 mm) bore 26 in (660 mm) stroke
- Low-pressure cylinder: 28 1/2 in (724 mm) bore 26 in (660 mm) stroke
- Valve gear: Walschaerts
- Valve type: HP Piston, LP Slide
- Couplers: Johnston link-and-pin
Performance figures
- Tractive effort: 46,414 lbf (206.46 kN) @ 50%
Career
- Operators: South African Railways
- Class: Class MC1
- Number in class: 15
- Numbers: 1634–1648
- Delivered: 1914
- First run: 1914
- Withdrawn: 1937

The South African Railways Class MC1 2-6-6-0 of 1914 was a steam locomotive.

In 1914 the South African Railways placed fifteen Class MC1 Mallet articulated compound steam locomotives with a 2-6-6-0 wheel arrangement in service.

== Manufacturer ==
Orders for an improved version of the Class MC were placed with the North British Locomotive Company in 1913. When the fifteen locomotives were delivered and placed in service in May 1914, they were designated Class MC1 and numbered in the range from 1634 to 1648.

== Characteristics ==
The Class MC1 were duplicates of the Class MC in most respects, to the extent that the majority of spare parts for the two classes were interchangeable. Improvements consisted mainly of 1/2 inch (13 millimetres) larger diameter high-pressure and low-pressure cylinders and a redesigned boiler which included a superheater instead of the saturated steam boiler of the Class MC. The high-pressure cylinders of the hind engine unit were equipped with piston valves while the low-pressure cylinders of the front engine unit were equipped with slide valves.

An externally obvious difference was the main steam pipes from the dome to the high-pressure cylinders, which was no longer arranged vertically down directly to the cylinders along the outside of the boiler, but internally via the superheater in the smokebox and from there along the underside of the running boards back to the cylinders. The result was a much better performing locomotive with an increased tractive effort brought about by the larger cylinders.

The locomotives were delivered with Type MP1 tenders with a coal capacity of 10 long tons (10.2 tonnes) and a water capacity of 4,250 imperial gallons (19,300 litres). The same tender was used by altogether sixteen locomotive classes, but those of the Class MC1 were fitted with a radial type of drawgear.

== Modifications ==
When the coupled wheel tyres had to be renewed, the diameter of the wheels was increased from 45 1/2 inches (1,156 millimetres) to 46 inches (1,168 millimetres). This reduced the tractive effort from 46,414 pounds-force (206 kilonewtons) at 50% of boiler pressure to 45,900 pounds-force (204 kilonewtons). Unlike all other locomotive types where the SAR reported tractive effort at 75% of boiler pressure, it followed an ultra-conservative practice of reporting that of all Mallet locomotives at 50%.

== Service ==
The Class MC1 was placed in service on the coal line from Witbank to Germiston. In later years, some also saw service on the Natal mainline and the Cape Midland System. A number of them were transferred to the Cape Western System where they served as banking engines up the Hex River Railpass between De Doorns and Touws River.

The locomotives were all finally withdrawn from service and scrapped during 1937.

== Illustration ==
The main picture shows driver Kok with his locomotive, c. 1930, while the following serve to illustrate both sides of the locomotive as well as the lined livery which was in use on the SAR when the locomotives were introduced.

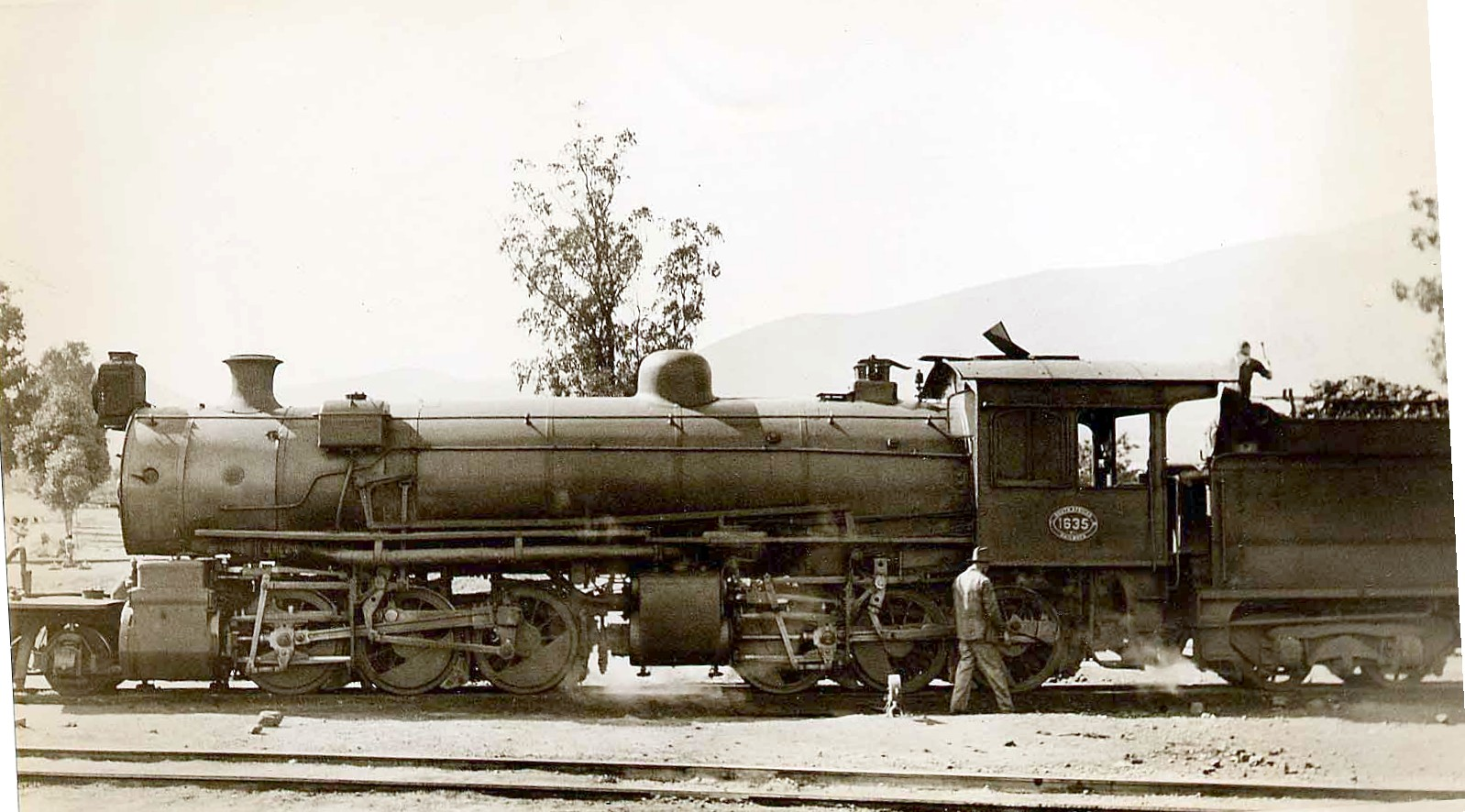
No. 1635 in service as banking engine at De Doorns, c. 1930
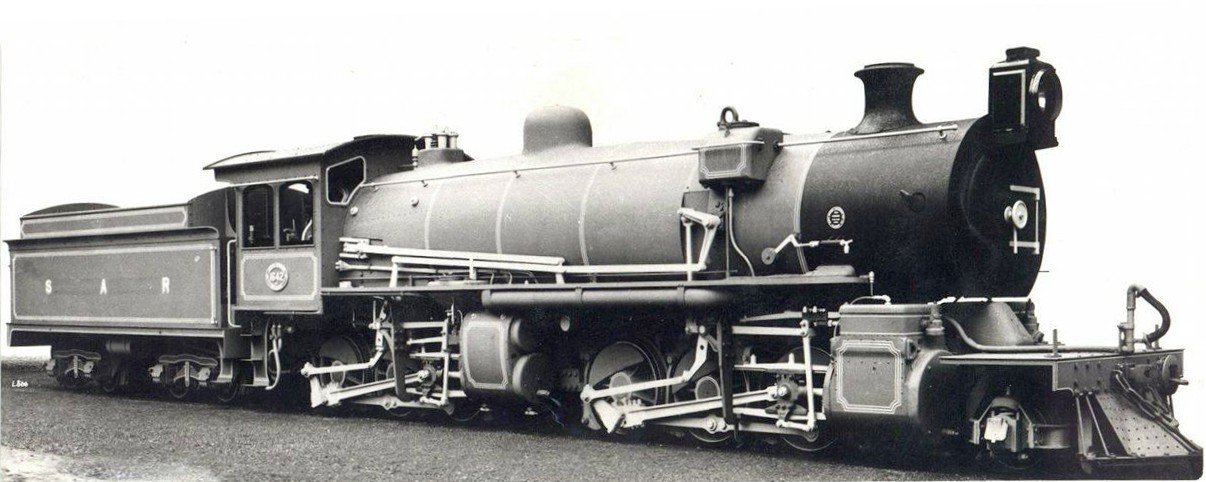
Works picture of Class MC1 no. 1642, c. 1914
