= South African Class MH 2-6-6-2 =

1915 articulated steam locomotive

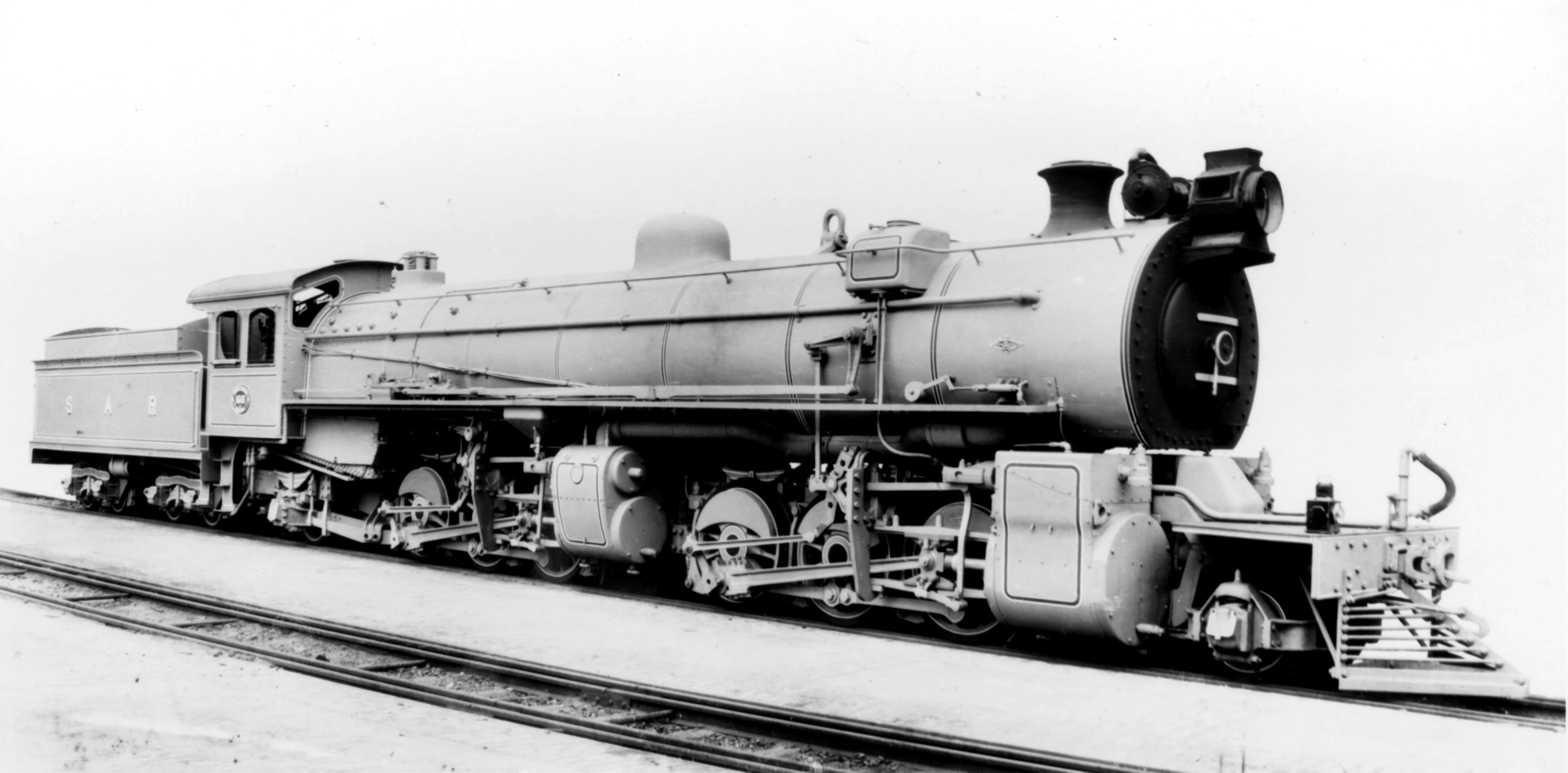
- SAR Class MH no. 1661, c. 1915
Type and origin
- Power type: Steam
- Designer: South African Railways (D.A. Hendrie)
- Builder: North British Locomotive Company
- Serial number: 20958-20962
- Model: SAR Class MH
- Build date: 1915
- Total produced: 5
Specifications
- Configuration
  - Whyte: 2-6-6-2 (Prairie Mallet)
  - UIC: (1'C)C1'hv4
- Driver: 3rd & 6th coupled axles
- Gauge: 3 ft 6 in (1,067 mm) Cape gauge
- Leading dia.: 28 1/2 in (724 mm)
- Coupled dia.: 48 in (1,219 mm)
- Trailing dia.: 33 1/2 in (851 mm)
- Tender wheels: 34 in (864 mm)
- Wheelbase: 70 ft 10 1/4 in (21,596 mm)
  - Engine: 43 ft 7 in (13,284 mm)
  - Coupled: 8 ft 8 in (2,642 mm) per unit
  - Tender: 16 ft 9 in (5,105 mm)
  - Tender bogie: 4 ft 7 in (1,397 mm)
- Length
  - Over couplers: 79 ft 5 in (24,206 mm)
- Height: 12 ft 10 in (3,912 mm)
- Frame type: Bar & Plate
- Axle load: 18 LT 4 cwt (18,490 kg)
  - Leading: 7 LT 9 cwt (7,570 kg)
  - 1st coupled: 16 LT 16 cwt (17,070 kg)
  - 2nd coupled: 16 LT 19 cwt (17,220 kg)
  - 3rd coupled: 17 LT 6 cwt (17,580 kg)
  - 4th coupled: 18 LT 4 cwt (18,490 kg)
  - 5th coupled: 18 LT 4 cwt (18,490 kg)
  - 6th coupled: 18 LT 4 cwt (18,490 kg)
  - Trailing: 15 LT 3 cwt (15,390 kg)
  - Tender bogie: Bogie 1: 27 LT 10 cwt (27,940 kg); Bogie 2: 23 LT 11 cwt (23,930 kg)
  - Tender axle: 13 LT 15 cwt (13,970 kg)
- Adhesive weight: 105 LT 13 cwt (107,300 kg)
- Loco weight: 128 LT 5 cwt (130,300 kg)
- Tender weight: 51 LT 1 cwt (51,870 kg)
- Total weight: 179 LT 6 cwt (182,200 kg)
- Tender type: MP1 (2-axle bogies)
- Fuel type: Coal
- Fuel capacity: 10 LT (10.2 t)
- Water cap.: 4,250 imp gal (19,300 L)
- Firebox
  - Type: Round-top
  - Grate area: 53 sq ft (4.9 m^{2})
- Boiler
  - Pitch: 7 ft 10 1/2 in (2,400 mm)
  - Diameter: 5 ft 11 in (1,803 mm)
  - Tube plates: 22 ft (6,706 mm)
  - Small tubes: 168: 2 1/4 in (57 mm)
  - Large tubes: 25: 5 1/2 in (140 mm)
- Boiler pressure: 180 psi (1,241 kPa)
- Safety valve: Ramsbottom
- Heating surface
  - Firebox: 250 sq ft (23 m^{2})
  - Tubes: 2,961 sq ft (275.1 m^{2})
  - Total surface: 3,211 sq ft (298.3 m^{2})
- Superheater
  - Heating area: 634 sq ft (58.9 m^{2})
- Cylinders: Four
- High-pressure cylinder: 20 in (508 mm) bore 26 in (660 mm) stroke
- Low-pressure cylinder: 31 1/2 in (800 mm) bore 26 in (660 mm) stroke
- Valve gear: Walschaerts
- Valve type: HP Piston; LP Richardson balanced slide
- Couplers: Johnston link-and-pin AAR knuckle (1930s)
Performance figures
- Tractive effort: 48,370 lbf (215.2 kN) @ 50%
Career
- Operators: South African Railways
- Class: Class MH
- Number in class: 5
- Numbers: 1661–1665
- Delivered: 1915
- First run: 1915
- Withdrawn: 1940

The South African Railways Class MH 2-6-6-2 of 1915 was an articulated Mallet-design steam locomotive.

In 1915, the South African Railways placed five Class MH Mallet articulated compound steam locomotives with a 2-6-6-2 wheel arrangement in coal hauling service.

== Manufacturer ==
During 1914, the requirement for locomotives with a high tractive effort to cope with the increasing volume of coal traffic between Witbank and Germiston led to the introduction of a heavy Mallet compound superheated engine with a 2-6-6-2 wheel arrangement.

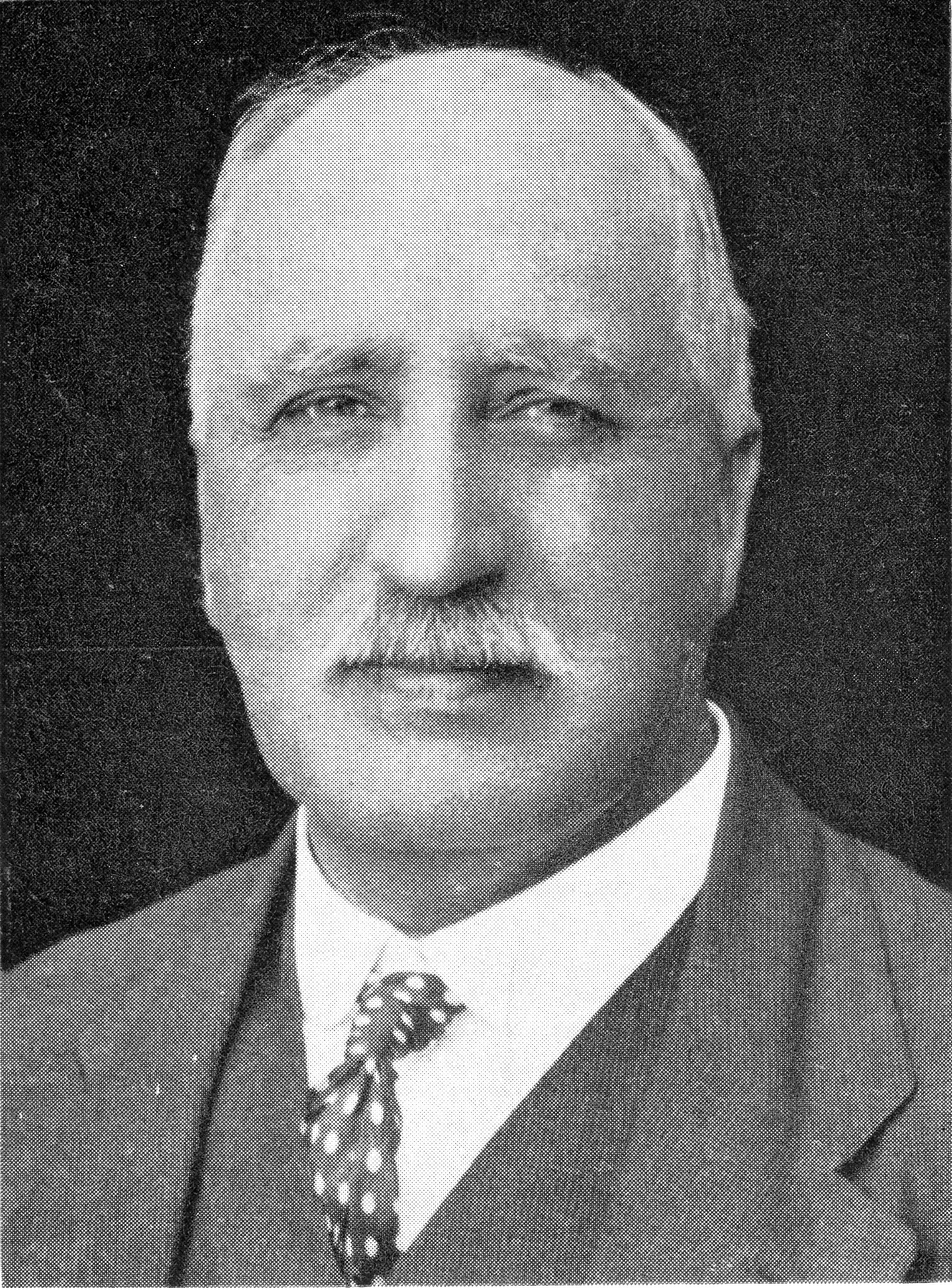
D. A. Hendrie

The Class MH Mallet articulated locomotive was designed in detail in the locomotive drawing office in Pretoria under the personal direction of D. A. Hendrie, Chief Mechanical Engineer (CME) of the South African Railways (SAR) from 1910 to 1922. The draughtsman, specially detached for the work, was J. R. Boyer who was later to become the Chief Locomotive Draughtsman of the SAR. Five of these very large locomotives were ordered from North British Locomotive Company and delivered in 1915, numbered in the range from 1661 to 1665. They were erected in the Salvokop shops in Pretoria and were placed in service in September 1915.

== Characteristics ==
The main bar frames, 4 1/2 inches (114 millimetres) thick, were machined from a 2 ft 2 1/2 in (673 mm) wide solid. The hind part of this frame was rigidly secured to the boiler through the high-pressure cylinder saddle castings and terminated just in front of the firebox outer throat plate. From this point rearwards, the frame was of the plate type and arranged to carry the spring gear and other fittings for the trailing Bissel truck.

The locomotives were superheated and had Walschaerts valve gear, controlled by steam reversing gear. The cylinders and steam chests were formed in three separate castings. The high-pressure cylinders were arranged with piston valves, while the low-pressure cylinders were arranged with Richardson balanced type slide valves, arranged above the cylinders. The steam chest covers of the low-pressure cylinders were designed with inclined joint faces to facilitate the handling of the valve and refacing of the ports during servicing.

As built, the boiler pressure was set to blow off at 200 pounds per square inch (1,379 kilopascals), which gave the engine a tractive effort of 53,750 pounds-force (239.1 kilonewtons) at 50% of boiler pressure. The setting was later reduced to 180 pounds per square inch (1,241 kilopascals), which reduced the tractive effort to 48,370 pounds-force (215.2 kilonewtons) at 50% of boiler pressure.

At the time of their introduction, the Class MH was the largest and most powerful locomotive in the world on Cape gauge. It attracted the attention of locomotive engineers throughout the world as an outstanding achievement for locomotive power on 3 feet 6 inches (1,067 millimetres) gauge.

Its 105 long tons 13 hundredweight (107,300 kilograms) adhesive weight and the SAR's ultra-conservative practice of reporting a Mallet's tractive effort at only 50% of boiler pressure resulted in a much lower than actual starting tractive effort of 48,370 pounds-force (215.2 kilonewtons). The Class MH was almost certainly capable of exerting more than 60,000 pounds-force (270 kilonewtons) tractive effort at starting.

== Service ==
They were initially placed in service on the coal line between Witbank and Germiston as intended to supplement the other Mallets already working on that line. In the 1930s they were transferred to Natal to work on the line between Vryheid and Glencoe, also hauling coal. They were outstanding in their performance and remained in Natal for the rest of their service lives until they were all retired and scrapped by 1940.

== Illustration ==
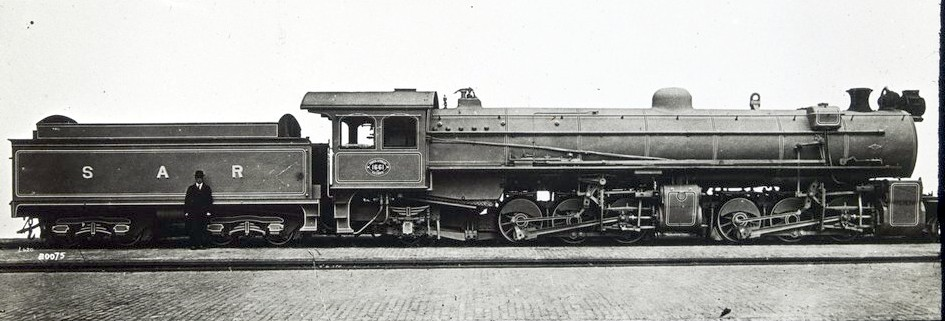
Class MH 2-6-6-2 Mallet no. 1661, c. 1915
