= South African Class 19B 4-8-2 =

1930 design of steam locomotive

South African Class 19B & 19BR 4-8-2
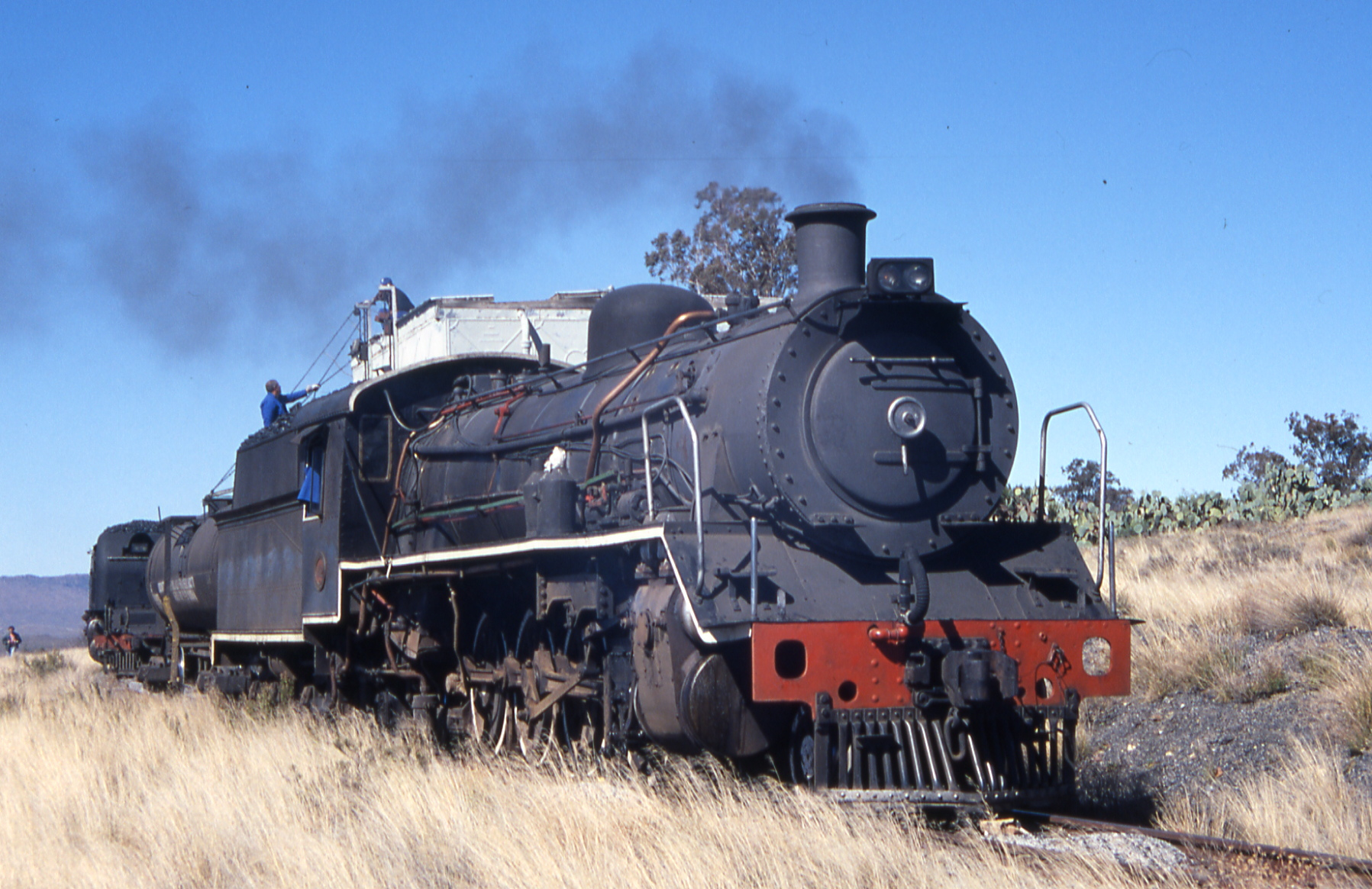
- No. 1412 taking water at Blouwater, c. 2001
Type and origin
- ♠ Class 19B as built with a round-topped firebox ♥ Class 19BR rebuilt with a Watson Standard boiler ♣ Type MT tender - ♦ Type MP1 tender
- Power type: Steam
- Designer: South African Railways (Col F.R. Collins DSO)
- Builder: Berliner Maschinenbau
- Serial number: 9827-9840
- Model: Class 19B
- Build date: 1930
- Total produced: 14
Specifications
- Configuration
  - Whyte: 4-8-2 (Mountain)
  - UIC: 2'D1'h2
- Driver: 2nd coupled axle
- Gauge: 3 ft 6 in (1,067 mm) Cape gauge
- Leading dia.: 28 1/2 in (724 mm)
- Coupled dia.: 54 in (1,372 mm)
- Trailing dia.: 34 in (864 mm)
- Tender wheels: ♣♦ 34 in (864 mm)
- Wheelbase: ♦ 58 ft 8 3/4 in (17,901 mm)
  - Axle spacing (Asymmetrical): 1-2: 4 ft 10 in (1,473 mm); 2-3: 4 ft 9 in (1,448 mm); 3-4: 4 ft 10 in (1,473 mm)
  - Engine: 32 ft 3 in (9,830 mm)
  - Leading: 6 ft 4 in (1,930 mm)
  - Coupled: 14 ft 5 in (4,394 mm)
  - Tender: ♣ 20 ft 5 in (6,223 mm) ♦ 16 ft 9 in (5,105 mm)
  - Tender bogie: ♣ 6 ft 2 in (1,880 mm) ♦ 4 ft 7 in (1,397 mm)
- Length
  - Over couplers: ♦ 67 ft 3 1/2 in (20,510 mm)
- Height: ♠ 12 ft 10 in (3,912 mm) ♥ 12 ft 10 7/8 in (3,934 mm)
- Frame type: Bar
- Axle load: ♠ 13 LT 16 cwt (14,020 kg) ♥ 13 LT 6 cwt (13,510 kg)
  - Leading: 14 LT 4 cwt (14,430 kg)
  - 1st coupled: 12 LT 15 cwt (12,950 kg)
  - 2nd coupled: 12 LT 16 cwt (13,010 kg)
  - 3rd coupled: 12 LT 19 cwt (13,160 kg)
  - 4th coupled: 12 LT 14 cwt (12,900 kg)
  - Trailing: ♠ 13 LT 16 cwt (14,020 kg) ♥ 13 LT 6 cwt (13,510 kg)
  - Tender bogie: Bogie 1: ♣ 32 LT 18 cwt (33,430 kg) ♦ 27 LT 10 cwt (27,940 kg); Bogie 2: ♣ 33 LT 2 cwt (33,630 kg) ♦ 23 LT 11 cwt (23,930 kg)
  - Tender axle: ♣ 16 LT 11 cwt (16,820 kg) ♦ 13 LT 15 cwt (13,970 kg)
- Adhesive weight: 51 LT 4 cwt (52,020 kg)
- Loco weight: 78 LT 14 cwt (79,960 kg)
- Tender weight: ♣ 66 LT (67,060 kg) ♦ 51 LT 1 cwt (51,870 kg)
- Total weight: ♣ 144 LT 14 cwt (147,000 kg) ♦ 129 LT 15 cwt (131,800 kg)
- Tender type: MT (2-axle bogies); MP1 (2-axle bogies); MP, MP1, MR, MT, MX, MY, MY1 permitted
- Fuel type: Coal
- Fuel capacity: ♣ 12 LT (12.2 t) ♦ 10 LT (10.2 t)
- Water cap.: ♣ 6,000 imp gal (27,300 L) ♦ 4,250 imp gal (19,300 L)
- Firebox
  - Type: Round-top
  - Grate area: ♠ 37 sq ft (3.4 m^{2}) ♥ 36 sq ft (3.3 m^{2})
- Boiler
  - Model: Watson Standard no. 1A
  - Pitch: 8 ft (2,438 mm)
  - Diameter: 5 ft (1,524 mm)
  - Tube plates: 20 ft 2 in (6,147 mm)
  - Small tubes: ♠ 120: 2 1/4 in (57 mm) ♥ 76: 2 1/2 in (64 mm)
  - Large tubes: ♠ 21: 5 1/2 in (140 mm) ♥ 24: 5 1/2 in (140 mm)
- Boiler pressure: 200 psi (1,379 kPa)
- Safety valve: Pop
- Heating surface
  - Firebox: ♠ 127 sq ft (11.8 m^{2}) ♥ 123 sq ft (11.4 m^{2})
  - Tubes: ♠ 2,036 sq ft (189.2 m^{2}) ♥ 1,700 sq ft (160 m^{2})
  - Arch tubes: ♠ 13 sq ft (1.2 m^{2}) ♥ 16 sq ft (1.5 m^{2})
  - Total surface: ♠ 2,176 sq ft (202.2 m^{2}) ♥ 1,839 sq ft (170.8 m^{2})
- Superheater
  - Heating area: ♠ 506 sq ft (47.0 m^{2}) ♥ 404 sq ft (37.5 m^{2})
- Cylinders: Two
- Cylinder size: 21 in (533 mm) bore 26 in (660 mm) stroke
- Valve gear: Walschaerts (No. 1401–1413); Caprotti (No. 1414)
- Valve type: Piston
- Couplers: AAR knuckle
Performance figures
- Tractive effort: 31,850 lbf (141.7 kN) @ 75%
Career
- Operators: South African Railways
- Class: Class 19B, 19BR
- Number in class: 14
- Numbers: 1401–1414
- Nicknames: Baby
- Delivered: 1930
- First run: 1930
- Withdrawn: c. 1977

The South African Railways Class 19B 4-8-2 of 1930 was a steam locomotive.

In 1930, the South African Railways placed fourteen Class 19B steam locomotives with a 4-8-2 Mountain type wheel arrangement in service. One of them was later reboilered and reclassified to Class 19BR.

== Manufacturer ==
Fourteen Class 19B 4-8-2 Mountain type steam locomotives were built in Germany by Berliner Maschinenbau AG and were delivered in 1930. All but one were built with Walschaerts valve gear.

== Characteristics ==
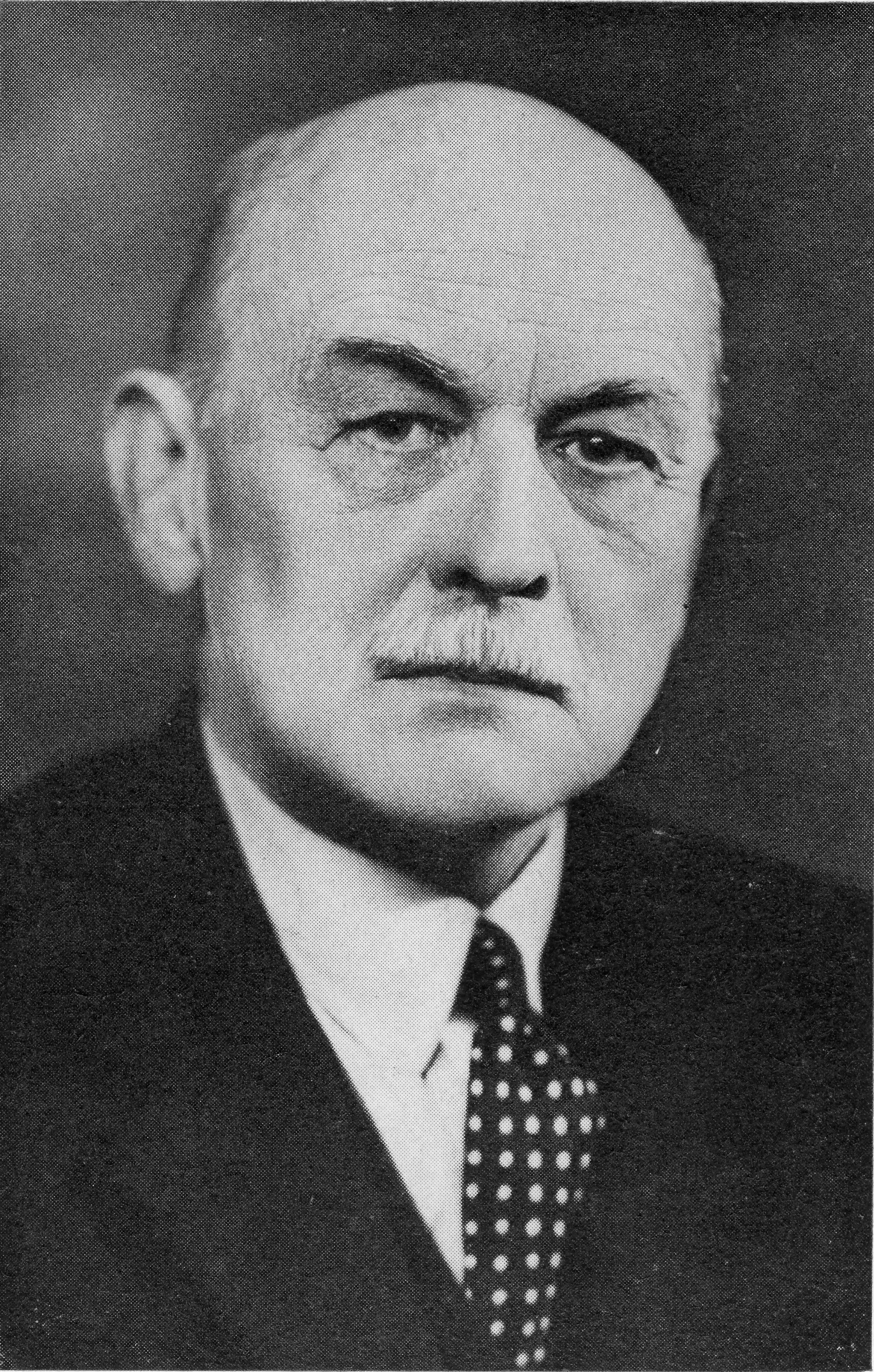
Col F.R. Collins DSO

The South African Class 19B, numbered in the range from 1401 to 1414, was a later model of the original Class 19 which had been designed in 1928 under the supervision of Colonel F.R. Collins DSO, Chief Mechanical Engineer (CME) of the SAR from 1922 to 1929. It was virtually identical to the Class 19 apart from the wheelbase of the front bogie which had been increased from 6 feet 2 inches (1,880 millimetres) to 6 feet 4 inches (1,930 millimetres) to improve the clearance between the cylinders and the bogie wheels, since the bogie wheels of predecessors Classes 19 and 19A fouled the cylinder covers on sharp curves. The longer wheelbase bogie also facilitated the removal of cylinder covers at running sheds. Because of this difference, the new engines were designated Class 19B.

The first thirteen Class 19B locomotives were delivered with Walschaerts valve gear, but like Class 16DA no. 879 of the same year, no. 1414 was equipped with Caprotti valve gear as an experiment. In January 1943, after thirteen years in service, the Caprotti rotary cam poppet valve gear was removed at the Uitenhage workshops and replaced with Walschaerts valve gear. The experiment did result in the successor Class 19C being built with rotary cam poppet valve gear.

The trailing bissel truck was constructed with three holes to enable the compensating beam to be fitted at three locations, which enabled it to be used to redistribute the engine's weight on the trailing axle. The axle load weights as shown for the Class 19B are with the trailing truck compensating beam pin in the rearmost of the three holes. The axle load weights as shown for the Class 19BR are also with the trailing truck compensating beam pin in the rearmost of the three holes.

A drawback of the Class 19B was that it was conservatively engineered with outdated short-travel valves which caused them to consume more coal for a given task than the later Class 19D.

As built, the Class 19B was delivered with Type MT tenders with a 12 long tons (12.2 tonnes) coal and a 6,000 imperial gallons (27,300 litres) water capacity, even though the axle load of 16 long tons 11 hundredweight (16,820 kilograms) of these tenders exceeded the permissible limits on the branch lines for which the Class 19B was intended. Upon delivery, their new Type MT tenders were exchanged for the smaller modified Type MP1 tenders from some of the reboilered mainline locomotives. The Type MP1 had a lighter axle load of 13 long tons 15 hundredweight (13,970 kilograms) and was therefore more suitable for branch line work. This policy was followed with all the Classes 19B, 19C and 19D locomotives except the last batch of Class 19D, which was delivered with Type MX torpedo tenders.

== Watson Standard boilers ==
From the 1930s, many serving locomotives were reboilered with a standard boiler type designed by then CME A.G. Watson as part of his standardisation policy. Such Watson Standard reboilered locomotives were reclassified by adding an "R" suffix to their classification.

When Class 19B no. 1410 was reboilered with a Watson Standard no. 1A boiler, it therefore became the sole member of Class 19BR. It was not equipped with a Watson cab with its distinctive inclined front in the process, but retained its original vertical fronted cab. It did, however, have the tell-tale rectangular regulator cover just to the rear of the chimney which identified it as a Watson Standard reboilered locomotive.

== Service ==
=== South African Railways ===
Some Class 19B locomotives served around Cape Town and between Kimberley and Vryburg, but most of them spent their working lives on the line between Graaff-Reinet and Rosmead across the Lootsberg Pass. A couple were also allocated to Sydenham in Port Elizabeth and occasionally worked on the Grahamstown branch.

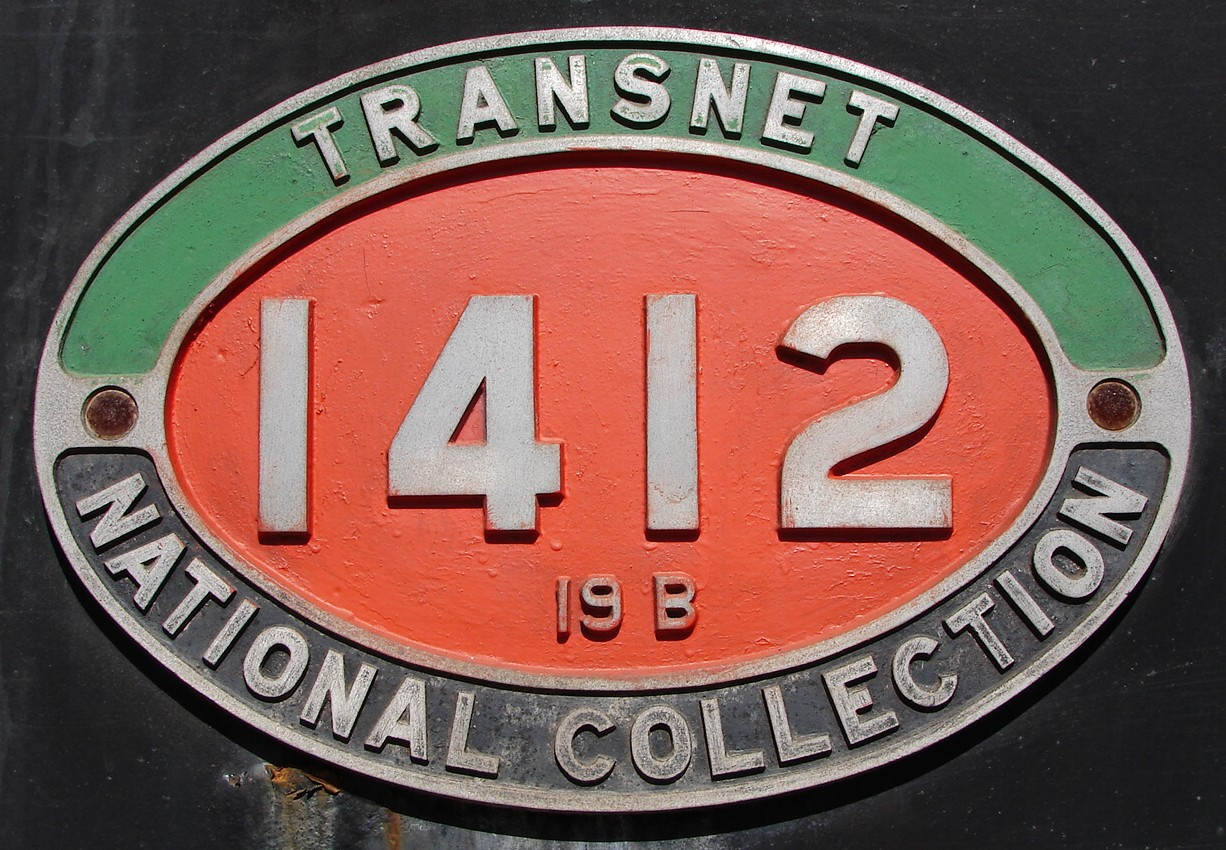

During the motive-power shortages of the late 1950s, the Rosmead-based engines and their crews were required to exert an almost super-human effort on the Mossel Bay-Johannesburg express on the section from Klipplaat to Noupoort and back to base at Rosmead in one day, hand-firing an inefficient engine more than a mile vertically over the Lootsberg and Carlton Heights mountain passes during the course of a 215 miles (346 kilometres), 12-hour shift. This schedule only became possible after completion of the mile-long Carlton tunnel under the continental divide in mid-1958, which eliminated the long 1 in 40 (2½%) gradients up the old line to Carlton summit.

Since the Class 19B was heavy on coal, a ground-level concrete coal bin was built at Graaff-Reinet especially to replenish these locomotives on through runs while standing in the platform road. There was no standpipe alongside the platform road, however, so even though coal was taken here, through-working engines took water at Charlwood and Pretoriuskloof.

During 1974–1975 they were replaced by Class 19D locomotives on the Rosmead-Klipplaat section. By 1977, they were all withdrawn from service.

=== Industrial ===
After being retired from SAR service, several were sold into a second career in industrial service.

- No. 1402 went to New Largo Colliery in Transvaal and later to the Enyati Railway.
- Numbers 1407 and 1409 went to Lorraine Gold Mine in the Orange Free State.
- Numbers 1410 and 1411 went to the Free State Geduld Gold Mine as numbers 8 and 7 respectively. They later became Freegold North numbers 10 and 11.
- No. 1413 went to the Fluor for Sasol plant in Transvaal.

== Preservation ==
| Number | Works nmr | THF / Private | Leaselend / Owner | Current Location | Outside South Africa | ? |
|---|---|---|---|---|---|---|
| 1402 | Berliner 9828 | Private | Railway Society of South African | Hilton Station | | |
| 1412 | Berliner 9838 | Private | Ekstrom Brothers | Voorbaai Locomotive Depot | | OPERATIONAL (Named Sylvia) |
| 1413 | Berliner 9839 | Private | Sasol Synfuels east | Secunda (Johannesburg) | | |

== Illustration ==
The main picture shows the Transnet National Collection's preserved Class 19B no. 1412 taking water at Blouwater before piloting a Class GMAM Garratt and the Union Express across the Lootsberg Pass, c. 2001. When withdrawn, no. 1412 was initially plinthed at Middelburg in the Cape Province and later restored. During 2016 it re-entered service as Bailey, restored at Voorbaai for the Ceres Rail Company.

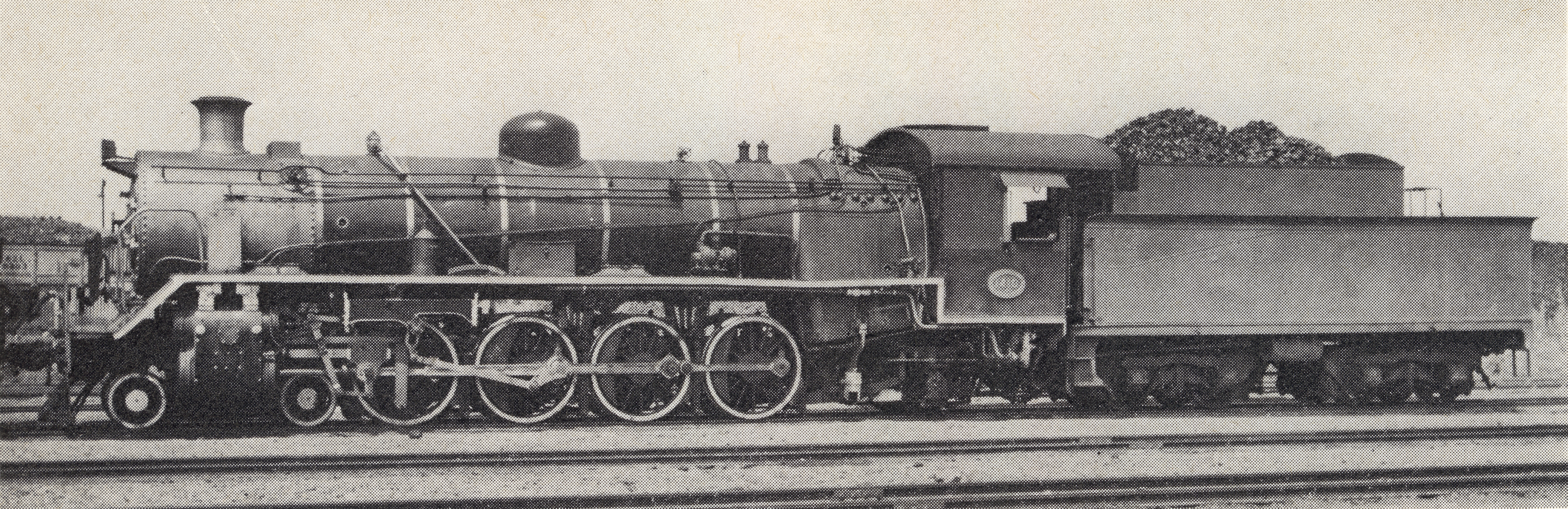
Reboilered Class 19BR no. 1410 at Sydenham, Port Elizabeth, c. 1966

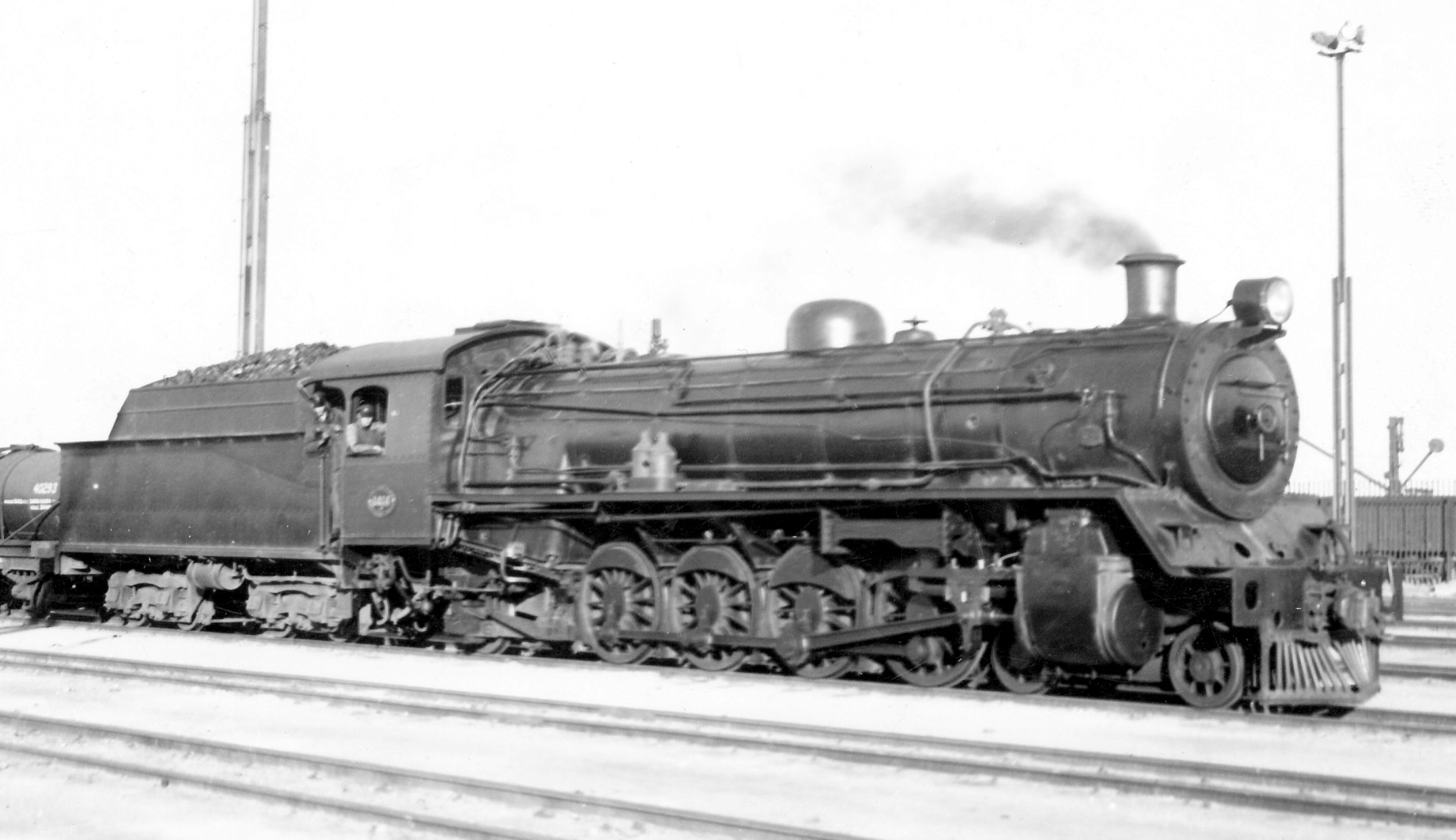
No. 1414 as built with Caprotti valve gear, Port Elizabeth c. 1940

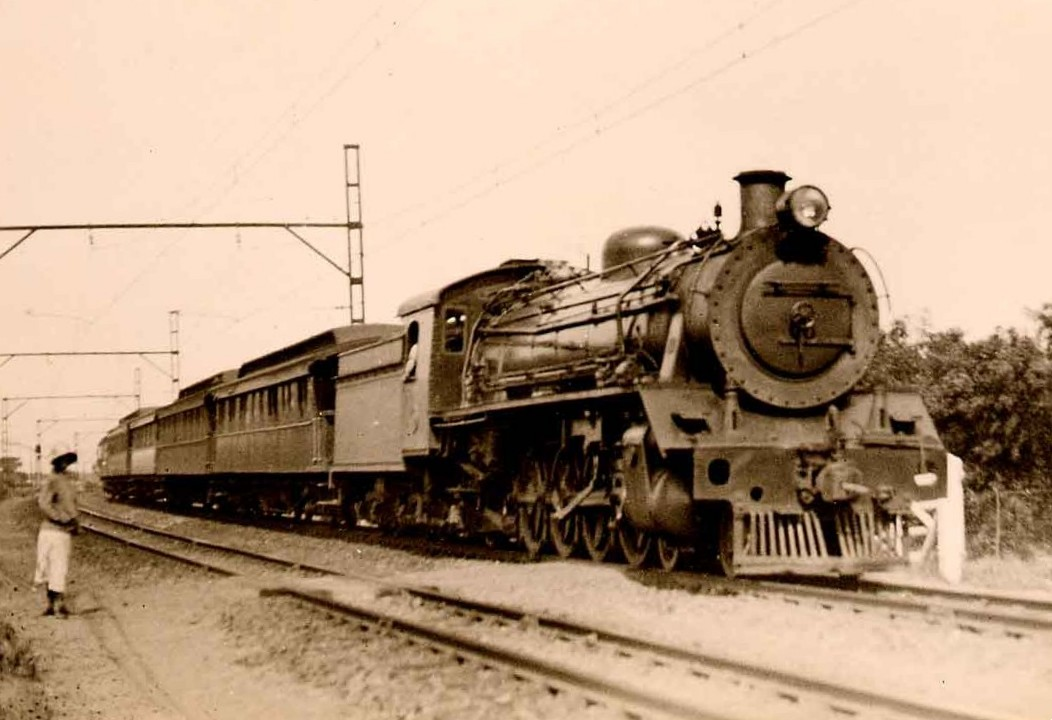
Class 19B on a Cape suburban, c. 1940

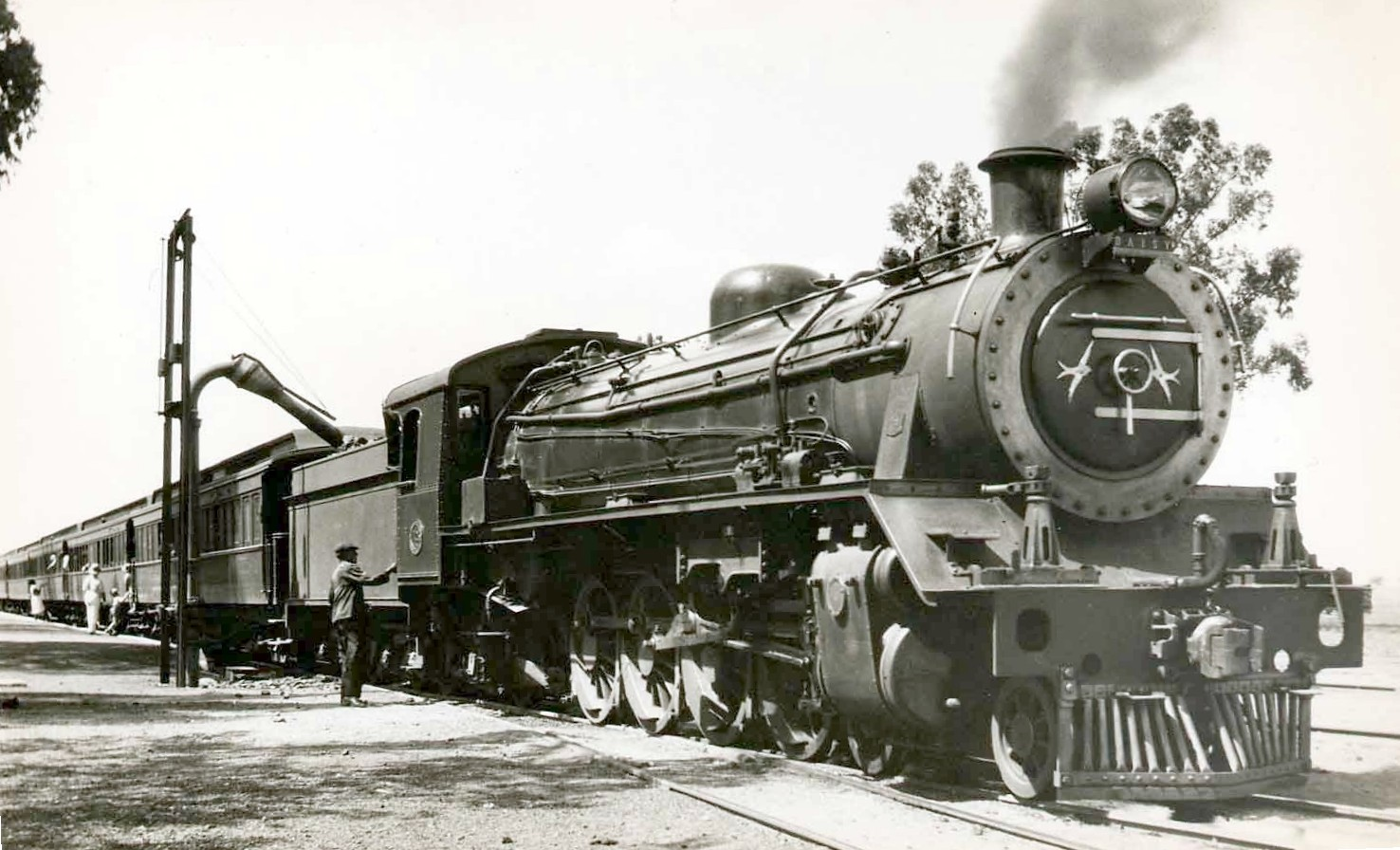
Class 19B Daisy taking water, c. 1940

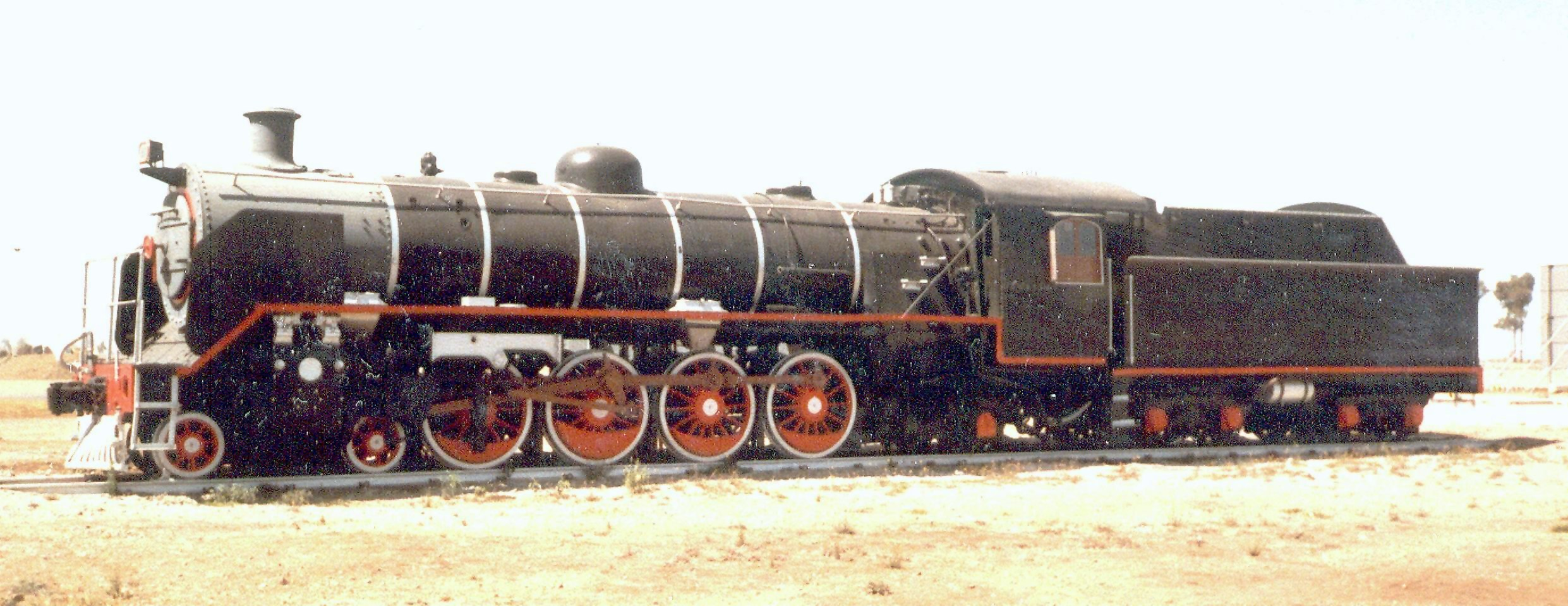
No. 1413 at Secunda with Sasol-applied smoke deflectors, c. 1980
