= South African Class 19D 4-8-2 =

1937 design of steam locomotive

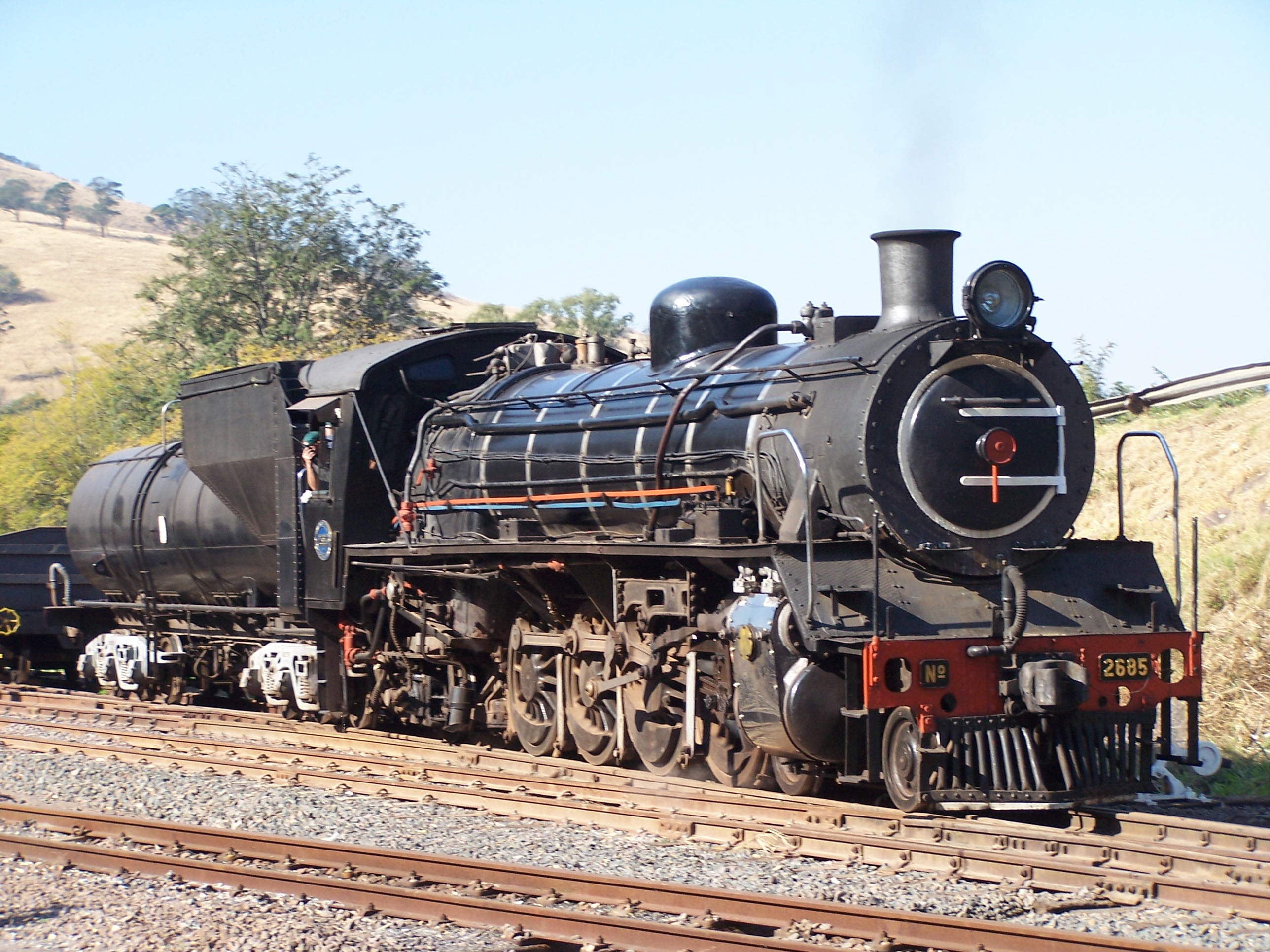
- Umgeni Steam Railway's no. 2685, 30 July 2006
Type and origin
- ♠ Numbers 2506-2545 – ♥ Numbers 2626-2640 ♣ Numbers 2641-2680 – ♦ Numbers 2681-2720 ʘ Numbers 2721-2770 – ʘ Numbers 3321-3370; T MT tender – P MP1 tender – X MX tender
- Power type: Steam
- Designer: South African Railways (W.A.J. Day)
- Builder: Friedrich Krupp; Borsig Lokomotiv Werke; Škoda Works; Robert Stephenson & Hawthorns; North British Locomotive Company; Henschel & Son
- Serial number: See table
- Model: Class 19D
- Build date: 1937–1953
- Total produced: 268
Specifications
- Configuration
  - Whyte: 4-8-2 (Mountain)
  - UIC: 2'D1'h2 (Wankie Colliery 2'D1'n2)
- Driver: 2nd coupled axle
- Gauge: 3 ft 6 in (1,067 mm) Cape gauge
- Leading dia.: 28 1/2 in (724 mm)
- Coupled dia.: 54 in (1,372 mm)
- Trailing dia.: 34 in (864 mm)
- Tender wheels: TPX 34 in (864 mm)
- Wheelbase: ♠♥♣♦ʘP 58 ft 8 3/4 in (17,901 mm) ʘX 76 ft 7 7/8 in (23,365 mm)
  - Axle spacing (Asymmetrical): 1-2: 4 ft 10 in (1,473 mm); 2-3: 4 ft 9 in (1,448 mm); 3-4: 4 ft 10 in (1,473 mm)
  - Engine: 32 ft 3 in (9,830 mm)
  - Leading: 6 ft 4 in (1,930 mm)
  - Coupled: 14 ft 5 in (4,394 mm)
  - Tender: T 20 ft 5 in (6,223 mm); P 16 ft 9 in (5,105 mm); X 34 ft 9 in (10,592 mm)
  - Tender bogie: T 6 ft 2 in (1,880 mm); P 4 ft 7 in (1,397 mm); X 8 ft 8 in (2,642 mm)
- Length
  - Over couplers: ♠♥♣♦ʘP 67 ft 3 5/8 in (20,514 mm) ʘX 86 ft 2 3/8 in (26,273 mm)
- Height: 12 ft 10 7/8 in (3,934 mm)
- Frame type: Bar
- Axle load: ♠ 13 LT 4 cwt (13,410 kg) ♥ 15 LT 10 cwt (15,750 kg) ♣ 13 LT 5 cwt (13,460 kg) ♦ 13 LT 12 cwt (13,820 kg) ʘ 14 LT 1 cwt (14,280 kg) ʘ 13 LT 19 cwt (14,170 kg)
  - Leading: ♠ 14 LT 7 cwt (14,580 kg) ♥ 13 LT 18 cwt (14,120 kg) ♣ 14 LT 7 cwt (14,580 kg) ♦ 14 LT 13 cwt (14,890 kg) ʘ 14 LT 9 cwt (14,680 kg) ʘ 13 LT 15 cwt (13,970 kg)
  - 1st coupled: ♠ 13 LT 2 cwt (13,310 kg) ♥ 13 LT 13 cwt (13,870 kg) ♣ 13 LT 3 cwt (13,360 kg) ♦ 13 LT 11 cwt (13,770 kg) ʘ 14 LT 1 cwt (14,280 kg) ʘ 13 LT 19 cwt (14,170 kg)
  - 2nd coupled: ♠ 13 LT 4 cwt (13,410 kg) ♥ 13 LT 13 cwt (13,870 kg) ♣ 13 LT 5 cwt (13,460 kg) ♦ 13 LT 12 cwt (13,820 kg) ʘ 13 LT 17 cwt (14,070 kg) ʘ 13 LT 15 cwt (13,970 kg)
  - 3rd coupled: ♠ 12 LT 19 cwt (13,160 kg) ♥ 13 LT 10 cwt (13,720 kg) ♣ 13 LT 1 cwt (13,260 kg) ♦ 13 LT 9 cwt (13,670 kg) ʘ 13 LT 19 cwt (14,170 kg) ʘ 13 LT 17 cwt (14,070 kg)
  - 4th coupled: ♠ 13 LT 3 cwt (13,360 kg) ♥ 15 LT 10 cwt (15,750 kg) ♣ 13 LT (13,210 kg) ♦ 13 LT 9 cwt (13,670 kg) ʘ 13 LT 18 cwt (14,120 kg) ʘ 13 LT 16 cwt (14,020 kg)
  - Trailing: ♠ 11 LT 17 cwt (12,040 kg) ♥ 12 LT 9 cwt (12,650 kg) ♣ 12 LT 1 cwt (12,240 kg) ♦ 12 LT 8 cwt (12,600 kg) ʘ 11 LT 2 cwt (11,280 kg) ʘ 11 LT 10 cwt (11,680 kg)
  - Tender bogie: Bogie 1: T 32 LT 18 cwt (33,430 kg); P 27 LT 10 cwt (27,940 kg); X 37 LT 10 cwt (38,100 kg); Bogie 2: T 33 LT 2 cwt (33,630 kg); P 23 LT 11 cwt (23,930 kg); X 35 LT 17 cwt (36,430 kg)
  - Tender axle: T 16 LT 11 cwt (16,820 kg); P 13 LT 15 cwt (13,970 kg); X 12 LT 10 cwt (12,700 kg)
- Adhesive weight: ♠ 52 LT 8 cwt (53,240 kg) ♥ 56 LT 6 cwt (57,200 kg) ♣ 52 LT 9 cwt (53,290 kg) ♦ 54 LT 1 cwt (54,920 kg) ʘ 55 LT 15 cwt (56,640 kg) ʘ 55 LT 7 cwt (56,240 kg)
- Loco weight: ♠ 78 LT 12 cwt (79,860 kg) ♥ 80 LT 13 cwt (81,940 kg) ♣ 78 LT 17 cwt (80,120 kg) ♦ 81 LT 2 cwt (82,400 kg) ʘ 81 LT 6 cwt (82,600 kg) ʘ 79 LT 12 cwt (80,880 kg)
- Tender weight: T 66 LT (67,060 kg); P 51 LT 1 cwt (51,870 kg); X 73 LT 7 cwt (74,530 kg)
- Total weight: ♠T 144 LT 12 cwt (146,900 kg) ♠P 129 LT 13 cwt (131,700 kg) ♥T 146 LT 13 cwt (149,000 kg) ♥P 131 LT 14 cwt (133,800 kg) ♣T 144 LT 17 cwt (147,200 kg) ♣P 129 LT 18 cwt (132,000 kg) ♦T 147 LT 2 cwt (149,500 kg) ♦P 132 LT 3 cwt (134,300 kg) ʘT 147 LT 6 cwt (149,700 kg) ʘP 132 LT 7 cwt (134,500 kg) ʘX 152 LT 19 cwt (155,400 kg)
- Tender type: T MT (2-axle bogies); P MP1 (2-axle bogies); X MX (Buckeye 3-axle bogies); MP, MP1, MR, MT, MX, MY, MY1 permitted
- Fuel type: Coal
- Fuel capacity: T 12 LT (12.2 t); P 10 LT (10.2 t); X 12 LT (12.2 t)
- Water cap.: T 6,000 imp gal (27,300 L); P 4,250 imp gal (19,300 L); X 6,500 imp gal (29,500 L)
- Firebox
  - Type: Round-top
  - Grate area: 36 sq ft (3.3 m^{2})
- Boiler
  - Model: Watson Standard no. 1A
  - Type: Domeless (2506-2525)
  - Pitch: 8 ft (2,438 mm)
  - Diameter: 5 ft (1,524 mm)
  - Tube plates: 20 ft 2 in (6,147 mm)
  - Small tubes: 76: 2 1/2 in (64 mm)
  - Large tubes: 24: 5 1/2 in (140 mm)
- Boiler pressure: 200 psi (1,379 kPa)
- Safety valve: Ross Pop
- Heating surface
  - Firebox: 123 sq ft (11.4 m^{2})
  - Tubes: 1,700 sq ft (160 m^{2})
  - Arch tubes: 16 sq ft (1.5 m^{2})
  - Total surface: 1,839 sq ft (170.8 m^{2})
- Superheater
  - Heating area: ♠♥♣♦ʘ 404 sq ft (37.5 m^{2}) ʘ 390 sq ft (36 m^{2})
- Cylinders: Two
- Cylinder size: 21 in (533 mm) bore 26 in (660 mm) stroke
- Valve gear: Walschaerts
- Valve type: Piston
- Couplers: AAR knuckle
Performance figures
- Tractive effort: 31,850 lbf (141.7 kN) @ 75%
Career
- Operators: South African Railways; Rhodesia Railways; Caminho de Ferro de Benguela; Nkana Copper Mines; Wankie Colliery
- Class: SAR Class 19D; RR 19th, 19B, 19C class CFB 11th Class
- Number in class: 268
- Numbers: SAR 2506-2545, 2626-2770, 3321-3370; CFB 401-406; RR 316–336; Nkana 107-108 (RR 337–338); WCC 1-4
- Nicknames: Dolly
- Delivered: 1937–1953
- First run: 1937

The South African Railways Class 19D 4-8-2 of 1937 was a steam locomotive.

Between 1937 and 1949, the South African Railways placed 235 Class 19D steam locomotives with a 4-8-2 Mountain type wheel arrangement in service. Between 1951 and 1955, 33 more were built for other operators like the Rhodesia and Angolan railways and the Nkana and Wankie mines, which makes the Class 19D the most numerous South African steam locomotive type ever built.

== Manufacturers ==
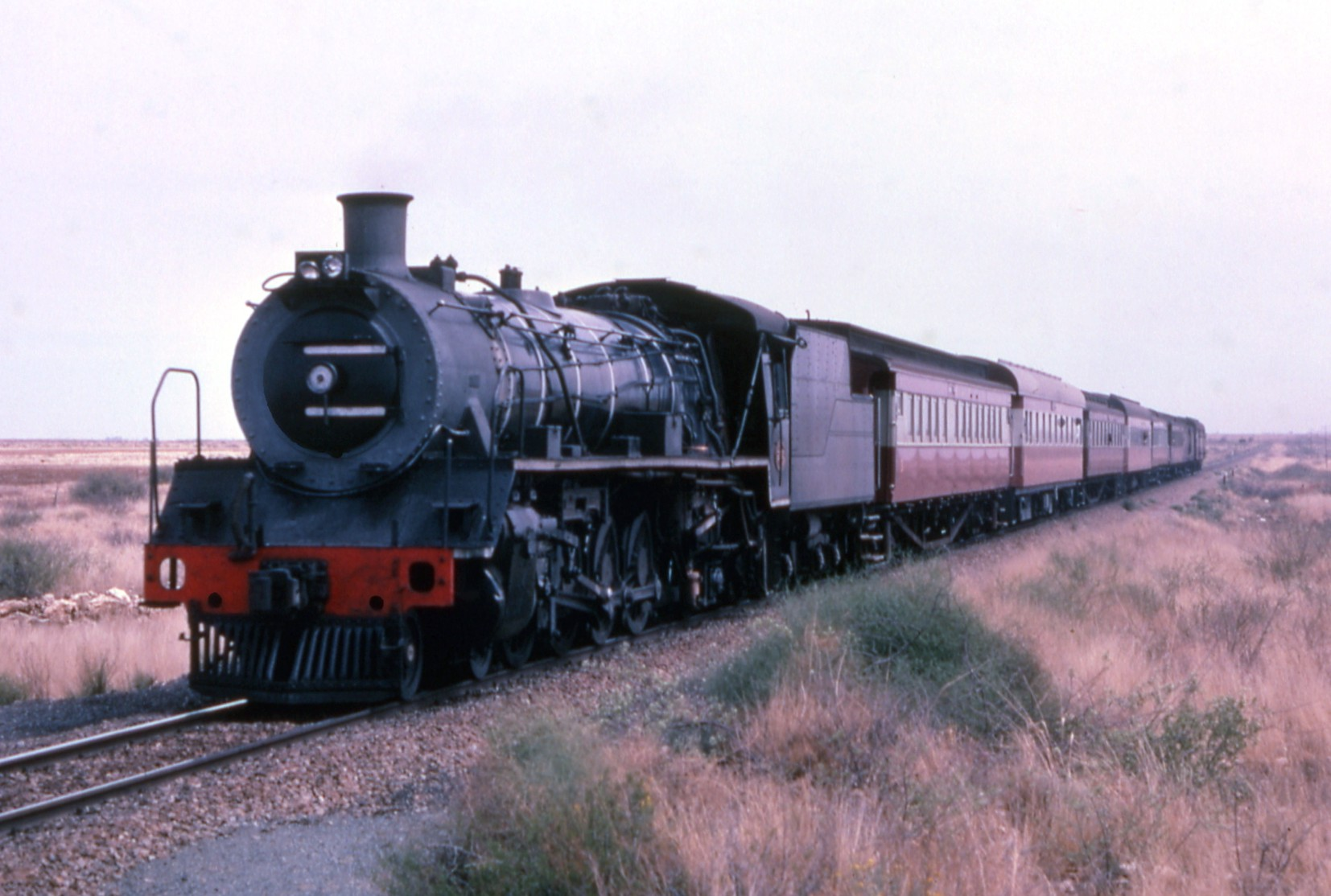
Škoda-built no. 2636 with a domeless boiler and Type MR tender on a passenger train near Vryburg, Northern Cape, October 1971

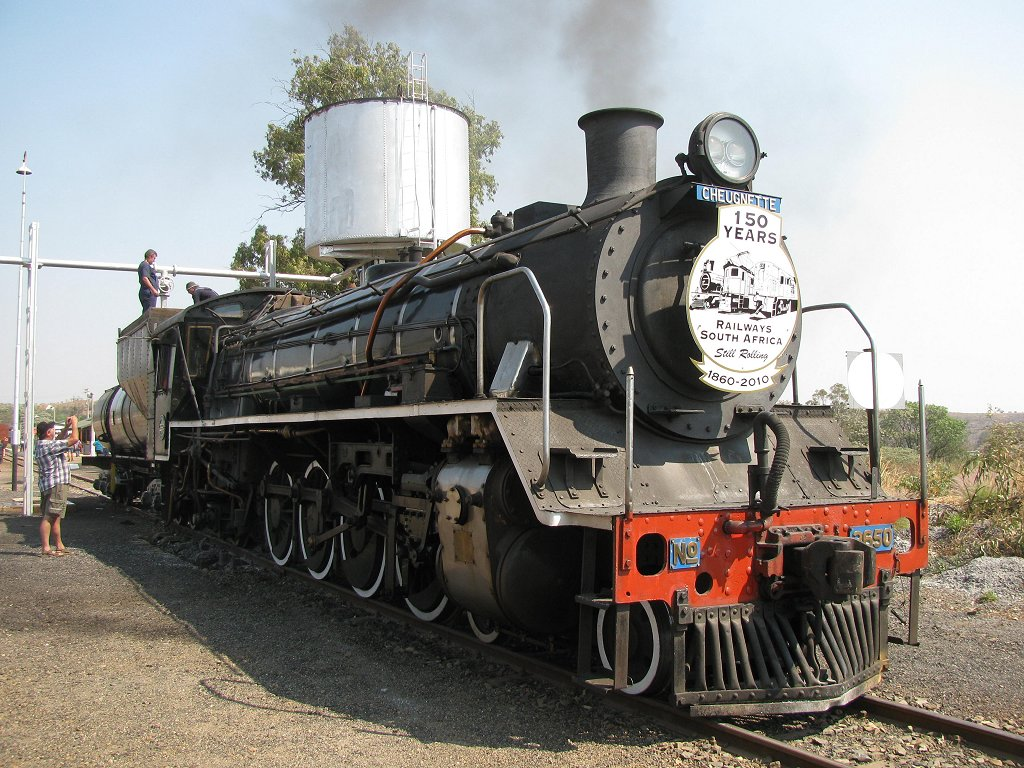
FOTR's Krupp-built no. 2650 with domeless boiler and Type MX Torpedo tender, Cullinan, 26 September 2010

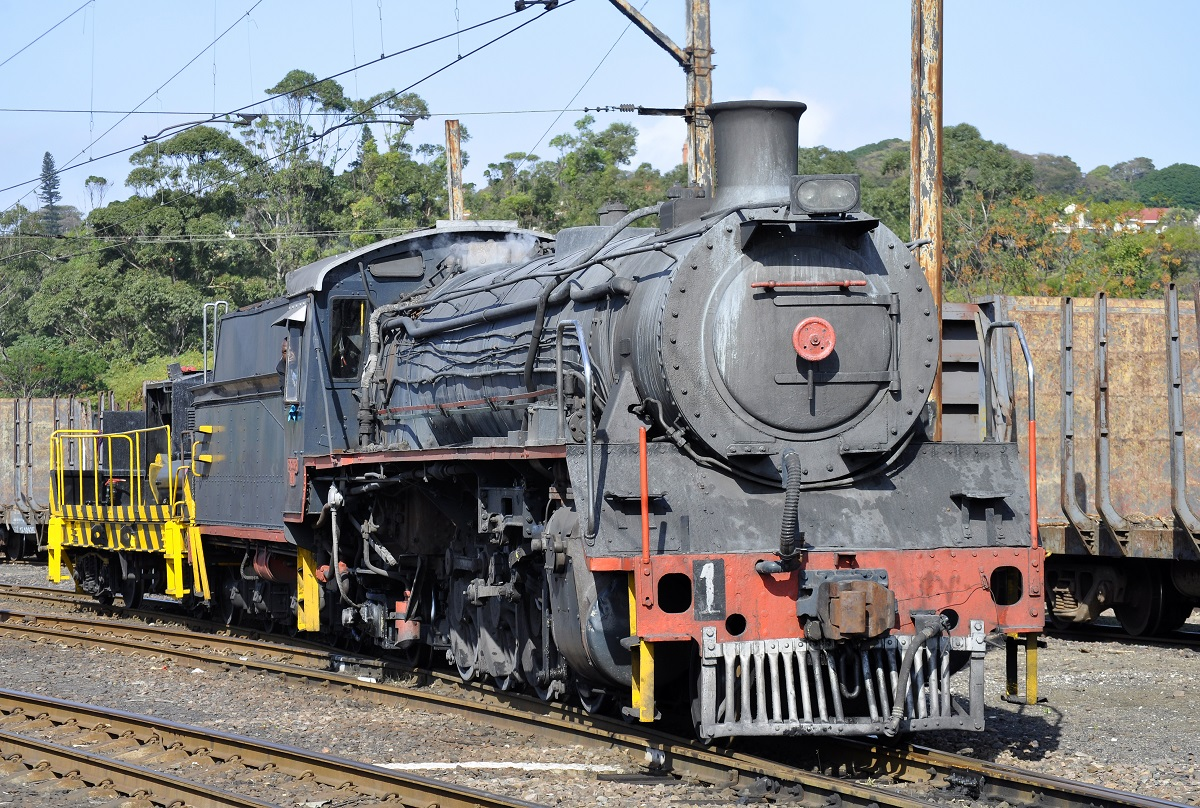
Saiccor's Borsig- built no. 2697 with domeless boiler and Type MP1 tender, Exchange Yard, Umkomaas, 2 July 2012

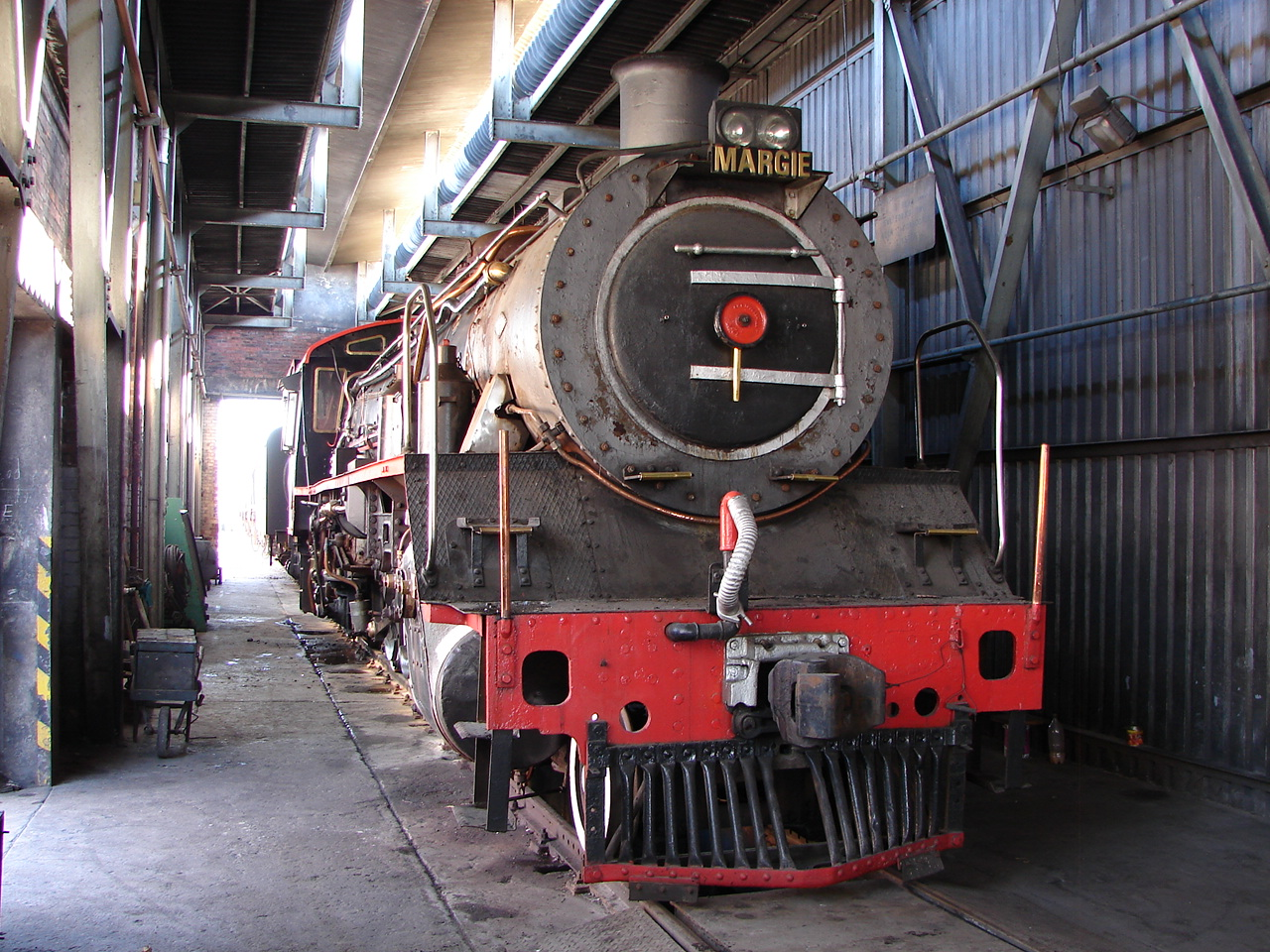
RSH-built no. 2749 with Type MX Torpedo tender, Voorbaai, Mosselbaai, Western Cape, 19 October 2009

The Class 19D 4-8-2 steam locomotive was the final development of the Class 19 family of locomotives. At the request of Colonel F.R. Collins, Chief Mechanical Engineer (CME) of the South African Railways (SAR) from 1922 to 1929, the original basic design of the Class 19 was done in the late 1920s by Test Engineer M.M. Loubser, who was himself later to serve as the CME from 1939 to 1949.

The final development of the Class was done in 1937 by W.A.J. Day, CME from 1936 to 1939. The Class 19D was a revised version of the Class 19C with piston valves and Walschaerts valve gear instead of rotary cam poppet valve gear.

Between 1937 and 1955, 268 Class 19D locomotives were built in seven batches by six locomotive manufacturers in Czechoslovakia, Germany and the United Kingdom and delivered to the SAR and several other operators in Southern Africa.

- The first forty were built in Germany in 1937, twenty with domeless boilers by Friedrich Krupp in Essen and numbered in the range from 2506 to 2525, and twenty by the Borsig Lokomotiv Werke in Hennigsdorf, Berlin and numbered in the range from 2526 to 2545.
- In 1938, a further 95 locomotives were ordered, built by three manufacturers. Škoda Works in Czechoslovakia built fifteen numbered in the range from 2626 to 2640, Krupp built forty, this time with domed boilers and numbered in the range from 2641 to 2680, and Borsig built forty numbered in the range from 2681 to 2720.
- Locomotive building was interrupted by World War II and post-war locomotive procurement saw European suppliers being replaced by British ones. In 1947, the first fifty post-war Class 19D locomotives were delivered by Robert Stephenson & Hawthorns (RSH) of Darlington, England and numbered in the range from 2721 to 2770. Of this order, engine no. 2734, RSH works no. 7247, was lost at sea off the east coast of England. Its replacement with RSH works number 7360 was paid for by insurance and it was given the number 2734 of the lost locomotive.
- The final batch of fifty Class 19D locomotives for the SAR were delivered in 1949 by the North British Locomotive Company (NBL) of Glasgow, Scotland and numbered in the range from 3321 to 3370. These engines were delivered with Type MX Torpedo tenders.
- In 1951, six were built by NBL for the Caminho de Ferro de Benguela (CFB) in Angola.
- Between 1951 and 1953, Henschel & Son built 21 more for the Rhodesia Railways (RR) and the Nkana copper mine in Northern Rhodesia.
- In 1955, four more were built by NBL for the Wankie coal mine in Southern Rhodesia.

== Characteristics ==
The Class 19D, nicknamed Dolly, was very similar to its predecessor Class 19C, but Day specified piston valves and Walschaerts valve gear instead of rotary cam poppet valve gear. The cylinders were redesigned with straighter steam ports while the valve gear itself was revamped with a longer steam lap and greater valve travel. In all other respects they were identical to the Class 19C. The last five locomotives of the first batch from Krupp, numbers 2521 to 2525, were fitted with exhaust steam injectors.

The cylinders were of the combined type, being cast in two identical and interchangeable sections, each made up of one cylinder and half of the smokebox saddle. They were of cast iron and had liners fitted. The design of the steam passages provided for a large cross-sectional area for both live and exhaust steam.

All coupled wheels were flanged. The axle boxes of the leading and trailing wheels were equipped with roller bearings while the solid bronze coupled wheel axle boxes were soft grease-lubricated. Soft grease lubrication was used throughout for the motion gear, except the piston rods, valve spindles and main crossheads which were oil-lubricated. Two four-feed sight lubricators, arranged in the cab, supplied oil to the steam chests and cylinders.

=== Watson Standard boilers ===
The Class 19D was delivered with a Watson Standard no. 1A boiler, fitted with Ross Pop safety valves and set at 200 pounds per square inch (1,379 kilopascals) pressure. The regulator was of the multiple-valve type, with the valves arranged on the saturated steam side of the superheater header in accordance with SAR practice. The boiler was one of the range of standard type boilers which were designed by Day's predecessor as CME, A.G. Watson, as part of his standardisation policy. The locomotive was also equipped with a Watson cab with its distinctive inclined front.

Despite the specifications, the first batch of Class 19D locomotives, built by Krupp and Borsig and delivered in 1937 and 1938, came in two variations. The Krupp-built locomotives were delivered with domeless boilers, while the Borsig-built locomotives conformed to the specifications with domed boilers.

While the domeless boilers did not conform to the specified Watson Standard no. 1A boiler as far as the dome was concerned, they were accepted nevertheless, probably since all their other dimensions were identical to that of the Watson Standard boiler. It appears that Krupp had decided on their own accord that a dome was not necessary since there was no regulator in the dome, but merely a standpipe. Krupp substituted the dome with a manhole cover on which the two Pop safety valves were mounted, while the steam was collected through a battery of collecting pipes, situated high up in the boiler in a similar manner to that which was used in the Class 16E.

All the subsequent Class 19D orders were delivered with domed Watson Standard no. 1A boilers with the usual standpipe steam collector high up in the dome, from where steam was led to the multi-valve regulator in the smokebox. Technically, whenever the loading gauge permitted the use of domes, their use was preferable to the domeless system which resulted in crowding multiple pipes into the boiler and other complications better left out of boilers. Operationally, according to drivers, there was no apparent difference in locomotive performance between the two boiler types.

The Watson Standard boilers are interchangeable between locomotives. In the process of locomotives undergoing major overhauls, these twenty Krupp-built domeless boilers migrated between engines during subsequent years. As a result, locomotives from the other builders and even some Classes 19A and 19C locomotives eventually ended up with some of these domeless boilers.

=== Tenders ===
As a result of having been built over such a long time span by so many different manufacturers, the six main groups of the Class 19D all had different all-up weights and axle loadings, as shown in the table and the specifications in the infobox. Over the eleven years during which the Class 19D was being produced for the SAR, some alterations occurred.

- As built, the Class 19D was delivered with Type MT tenders with a 12 long tons (12.2 tonnes) coal and a 6,000 imperial gallons (27,300 litres) water capacity, even though the axle load of 16 long tons 11 hundredweight (16,820 kilograms) of these tenders exceeded the permissible limits on the branch lines for which the Class 19D was intended. Upon delivery, their new Type MT tenders were exchanged for the smaller modified Type MP1 tenders from some of the reboilered mainline locomotives. The Type MP1, many of which were later rebuilt to Type MR tenders, had a lighter axle load of 13 long tons 15 hundredweight (13,970 kilograms) and was therefore more suitable for branch line work. This policy was followed with all the Classes 19B, 19C and 19D, except the last batch of Class 19D for the SAR, numbers 3321 to 3370.
- During 1944 Dr. M.M. Loubser, then CME, who had been involved with the design of the Class 19 family from the very beginning in the late 1920s, made further improvements to the Class 19D. All the post-war locomotives came equipped with vacuum brake systems in addition to the steam brakes. The two 21 inches (533 millimetres) vacuum cylinders were fitted under the running boards on either side at a point about midway between the leading and driving coupled wheels, while the vacuum chamber was arranged in line with the intermediate coupled wheels.
- The final batch from NBL, numbers 3321 to 3370, had Type MX tank wagon type tenders with cylindrical water tanks, similar in appearance to the American Vanderbilt type tenders. They were built to the design of Dr. M.M. Loubser, ran on three-axle Buckeye bogies and became commonly known as Torpedo tenders.

== Service ==
=== South African Railways ===
During the service life of the Class 19D, several tender exchanges occurred to best equip a locomotive for the region it was allocated to and the type of service it was to be employed in. In line service, type MX Torpedo tenders were usually preferred for their larger coal and water capacities. The result was that by the time the Class 19D was withdrawn from service in the late 1980s, many had exchanged their Type MP1 or Type MR tenders for Type MX Torpedo tenders and vice versa. Type MX Torpedo tenders also ended up attached to Class 19B and Class 19C locomotives.

The Class 19D was the most numerous South African branch line locomotive and, at 235 built for the SAR, was only twenty less in number than the Class 15F mainline locomotive, the most numerous South African steam class. The Class 19D was very versatile and saw main- and branch line service all over South Africa with the exception of the Western Cape, where the Class 19C was used.

Tasks varied from mainline local and international passenger trains on the section between Warrenton and Mafeking en route between South Africa and Northern Rhodesia via Bechuanaland and Southern Rhodesia, to secondary and branch line duties and in later years as shunting engines. On occasion, South African Class 19D locomotives worked through from Mafikeng in South Africa via Botswana all the way to Bulawayo in Zimbabwe. SAR Class 19D locomotives were also hired out for shunting work to the Rhodesia Railways for use at Beit Bridge and to Mozambique for use at Lourenco Marques.

From c. 1972, the new Union Carriage & Wagon-built Blue Train was stabled at Pretoria. After Capital Park's blue-liveried Class S2 no. 3793 was withdrawn along with the rest of its class in 1979–1980, the Pretoria station carriage-shunt duties were taken over by a blue-painted Class 19D no. 2749, the only member of the class to serve in a different SAR livery from the usual black. Apart from shunting work, the blue Dolly was often specially requested to work the Cullinan train during the Jacaranda season.

The Class 19D remained in service until the end of steam on South African Railways, being some of the last steam locomotives replaced by electric and diesel-electric traction.

=== Other operators ===
Other Southern African railways and some industries also purchased locomotives built to the Class 19D design. When these foreign versions are included, a total of 268 locomotives were built to the Class 19D design making them even more numerous than the Class 15F.

==== Benguela Railway ====
Six were built for the Caminho de Ferro de Benguela (CFB or Benguela Railway) in Angola by NBL in 1951, as their 11th Class and numbered in the range from 401 to 406. These locomotives were wood- or coal-fired, depending on where they were operating, and had tenders with slatted frames installed on top of the bunker to increase their fuel capacity when wood was used. In August 1972, for example, numbers 401, 402 and 406 were based at Lobito and were observed to be coal-fired. At the same time, numbers 403 and 405 were observed at Luso and no. 404 at Nova Lisboa, all wood-fired.

==== Rhodesia Railways ====
Between 1951 and 1953, Henschel & Son built twenty for Rhodesia Railways, their 19th class, numbered in the range from 316 to 335. They had tenders similar to the SAR Torpedo type, but with plate frame bogies instead of cast frame Buckeye bogies.

A single RR 19C class, no. 336, was built by Henschel in 1953 as a condensing locomotive. After a collision in 1956, it was rebuilt into a non-condensing 19th Class and re-entered service in 1958. The condensing tender was rebuilt to a Torpedo tender by mounting a tank and coal bunker, supplied locally in Bulawayo, on the frame. This rebuilt tender is the one paired with no. 330 which is preserved in the Bulawayo Railway Museum.

By June 1975, only three were left in service, all allocated to the Bulawayo shed, but with two out-stationed at Mafeking in South Africa.

==== Nkana Mines ====
Two were built by Henschel for the Nkana copper mines in Northern Rhodesia in 1952, numbered 107 and 108. In 1967, they were sold to a Rhodesian scrap merchant who, in turn, sold them to Rhodesia Railways where they were overhauled and placed back in service in 1968 as RR 19B Class no. 337 and 338.

==== Wankie Colliery ====
In 1955 four more without superheating and numbered in the range from 1 to 4 were built to the design of the Class 19D by NBL for the Wankie Colliery in Southern Rhodesia.

=== Industrial use ===
As they were being retired, several Class 19D locomotives were sold into industrial service. By the late 1980s, some of them were already at work at Dunn's, Saiccor, Loraine Gold Mine and Bamangwato Concessions Ltd. (BCL) in Botswana, and more were to follow.

As late as 2011, two Class 19Ds which had been used on the Vaal Reefs Gold Mine in the 1980s until they were retired and dumped at Jan Kempdorp where they stood unprotected for about twenty years, were bought by BCL Selebi-Phikwe. The locomotives, possibly numbers 2678 and 2689, were to be overhauled for use by the mine there, which was still operating ex-SAR Class 19D and ex-RR 19th class locomotives. By June 2012, the first of these two was put into service. However the mine closed in late 2016 putting the entire fleet out of work and now up for sale (December 2018).

== Red Devil predecessor ==
As a trial run before SAR mechanical engineer David Wardale was granted permission to proceed to rebuild a Class 25NC 4-8-4 locomotive to the Class 26 Red Devil in 1979, he was allowed to carry out modifications to a Class 19D locomotive. The locomotive selected for the experiment was Krupp-built no. 2644, a particularly poor-steaming member of the Class at the time.

A gas producer combustion system (GPCS) and dual Lempor exhaust were installed, along with some other small improvements. The Lempor had a four-jet blastpipe with extended petticoats to provide truer ejector proportions. To accommodate the arrangement, the smokebox was extended by 300 millimetres (11.8 inches). Steam flow in the cylinders was improved by streamlining the edges of the piston valves which were each equipped with an additional valve ring to reduce leakage. The firebox was modified to the GPCS system wherein principal combustion is effected using secondary air introduced above the firebed through ducts in the firebox sides, while primary air was restricted through dampers and a redesigned grate.

Firebox turbulence was created by steam jets and clinkering was inhibited by introducing exhaust steam under the grate. Sanding was improved and de-sanding jets were installed to clean the rails after the locomotive had passed.

The modifications improved the locomotive's steaming rate and enabled it to achieve significantly higher power and significantly lower fuel consumption than other unmodified Class 19D locomotives, the coal savings and increased output being in the order of 20% to 25%. The success of this experiment convinced the SAR management at the time of the viability of the project which culminated in the Class 26 Red Devil.

== Preservation ==
Numerous members of the Class 19D have been preserved.

Number (* MX tender)	Works nmr.	THF / Private	Leaselend / Owner	Current Location	Outside South Africa	Notes
2510	Krupp 1622	Private	Municipality	Barkly East (Town Centre)		
2526	Borsig 14643	Private	New Cape Central Railway (NCCR)	Waterval-Boven Locomotive Depot		
2534	Borsig 14651	Private	Municipality	Naboomspruit (Town Centre)		
2540 *	Borsig 14657	THF		Germiston Locomotive Depot		
2541	Borsig 14658	Private	Municipality	Potgietersrus (Town Centre)		Domeles boiler
2633	Skoda 928	Private	Sandstone Heritage Trust	Sandstone Heritage Trust		
2637	Skoda 932	THF	Umgeni Steam Railway	Masons Mill Locomotive Depot		
2640 *	Skoda 935	THF		Voorbaai Locomotive Depot		
2649 *	Krupp 1829	THF		George Locomotive Depot		Last steam locomotive to be used on the Outeniqua Choo Tjoe
2650	Krupp 1830	THF	Wonder Steam Trains	Hermanstad (Station)		Domeles boiler
2654 *	Krupp 1834	Private	Sandstone Heritage Trust	Bloemfontein Locomotive Depot		Operational
2656 *	Krupp 1836	Private	Municipality	Jan Kempdorp (Town Centre)		Domeles boiler
2666 *	Krupp 1849	THF		Queenstown Locomotive Depot		Domeles boiler
2669	Krupp 1852	THF	Paton's Country Narrow Gauge Railway	Creighton (Station)		Domeless boiler
2678 *	Krupp 1861	Private	Selebi-Phikwe copper mine	Selebi-Phikwe	Botswana	BCL LO813 (sold/scrap)
2682	Borsig 14738	Private	Municipality	Schweizer-Reneke (Town Centre)		
2683	Borsig 14734	THF		Voorbaai Locomotive Depot		
2685	Borsig 14736	Private	Umgeni Steam Railway	Kloofstation (Inchanga)		Operational
2688	Borsig 14739	Private	Municipality	Warrenton (Town Centre)		Domeles boiler
2689 *	Borsig 14740	Private	Selebi-Phikwe copper mine	Selebi-Phikwe	Botswana	BCL LO812 (sold/scrap)
2690 *	Borsig 14741	Private	Municipality	Wakkerstroom (Town Centre)		
2695	Borsig 14746	Private	Ian Welch	Plimmerton	New Zealand	
2696 *	Borsig 14747	Private	Municipality	Volksrust (Town Centre)		
2698 *	Borsig 14749	THF		Voorbaai Locomotive Depot		
2702 *	Borsig 14753	Private	Rovos Rail	Capital Locomotive Depot		Named Bianca
2709	Borsig 14760	THF		Krugersdorp Locomotive Depot		Domeless boiler
2711	Borsig 14765	Private	North West Agricultural Museum	Lichtenburg		
2714	Borsig 14762	THF		Queenstown Locomotive Depot		
2749 *	RSH 7262	THF		Voorbaai Locomotive Depot		
2765 *	RSH 7278	Private	Selebi-Phikwe copper mine	Selebi-Phikwe	Botswana	BCL LO805 (sold/scrap)
3321 *	NBL 26041	Private	Ceres Railway Company	Ceres Golf Estate		Non-Operational (oil burner)
3322	NBL 26042	Private	Ceres Railway Company	Royal Cape Yacht Club		Operational (oil burner)
3323 *	NBL 26043	THF		George Locomotive Depot		
3324 *	NBL 26044	THF		Voorbaai Locomotive Depot		
3325	NBL 26045	THF		Queenstown Locomotive Depot		
3327	NBL 26047	THF		Bloemfontein Locomotive Depot		
3328 *	NBL 26048	Private	Municipality	Coligny (Town Centre)		
3330	NBL 26050	THF		Queenstown Locomotive Depot		
3332 *	NBL 26052	Private	Ian Welch	Robertson, WC (NCCR)		
3334 *	NBL 26054	THF		Voorbaai Locomotive Depot		(oil burner)
3337	NBL 26057	THF		Queenstown Locomotive Depot		
3341 *	NBL 26061	Private	Grand Bradley	Germiston Locomotive Depot		BCL LO807
3345	NBL 26065	THF	Gold Reef City	Gold Reef City		
3348	NBL 26068	THF		Queenstown Locomotive Depot		
3350 *	NBL 26070	Private	Selebi-Phikwe copper mine	Selebi-Phikwe	Botswana	BCL LO806 / Plinth Main Street
3356 *	NBL 26076	Private	Municipality	Vryburg (Town Centre)		
3360 *	NBL 26080	Private	Rovos Rail	Capital Park Locomotive Depot		Operational; Named Shaun
3361 *	NBL 26081	THF		Queenstown Locomotive Depot		
3364	NBL 26084	THF		Queenstown Locomotive Depot		
3366*	NBL 26086	Private	The Thusa Foundation NPC	Hermanstad (Station)		Operational

== Works numbers and renumbering ==
The table shows the Class 19D builders, works numbers, years built and engine numbers. Batch code symbols for the weight specifications as defined in the infobox are included in the "Notes" column.

Class 19D 4-8-2 — builders and works numbers
Builder	Works no.	Year built	Railway	Loco No.	Notes
Krupp	1618	1937	SAR	2506	♠ Domeless
Krupp	1619	1937	SAR	2507	♠ Domeless
Krupp	1620	1937	SAR	2508	♠ Domeless
Krupp	1621	1937	SAR	2509	♠ Domeless
Krupp	1622	1937	SAR	2510	♠ Domeless
Krupp	1623	1937	SAR	2511	♠ Domeless
Krupp	1624	1937	SAR	2512	♠ Domeless
Krupp	1625	1937	SAR	2513	♠ Domeless
Krupp	1626	1937	SAR	2514	♠ Domeless
Krupp	1627	1937	SAR	2515	♠ Domeless
Krupp	1628	1937	SAR	2516	♠ Domeless
Krupp	1629	1937	SAR	2517	♠ Domeless
Krupp	1630	1937	SAR	2518	♠ Domeless
Krupp	1631	1937	SAR	2519	♠ Domeless
Krupp	1632	1937	SAR	2520	♠ Domeless
Krupp	1633	1937	SAR	2521	♠ Domeless
Krupp	1634	1937	SAR	2522	♠ Domeless
Krupp	1635	1937	SAR	2523	♠ Domeless
Krupp	1636	1937	SAR	2524	♠ Domeless
Krupp	1637	1937	SAR	2525	♠ Domeless
Borsig	14643	1937	SAR	2526	♠
Borsig	14644	1937	SAR	2527	♠
Borsig	14645	1937	SAR	2528	♠
Borsig	14646	1937	SAR	2529	♠
Borsig	14647	1937	SAR	2530	♠
Borsig	14648	1937	SAR	2531	♠
Borsig	14649	1937	SAR	2532	♠
Borsig	14650	1937	SAR	2533	♠
Borsig	14651	1937	SAR	2534	♠
Borsig	14652	1937	SAR	2535	♠
Borsig	14653	1937	SAR	2536	♠
Borsig	14654	1937	SAR	2537	♠
Borsig	14655	1937	SAR	2538	♠
Borsig	14656	1937	SAR	2539	♠
Borsig	14657	1937	SAR	2540	♠
Borsig	14658	1937	SAR	2541	♠
Borsig	14659	1937	SAR	2542	♠
Borsig	14660	1937	SAR	2543	♠
Borsig	14661	1937	SAR	2544	♠
Borsig	14662	1937	SAR	2545	♠
Škoda	921	1938	SAR	2626	♥
Škoda	922	1938	SAR	2627	♥
Škoda	923	1938	SAR	2628	♥
Škoda	924	1938	SAR	2629	♥
Škoda	925	1938	SAR	2630	♥
Škoda	926	1938	SAR	2631	♥
Škoda	927	1938	SAR	2632	♥
Škoda	928	1938	SAR	2633	♥
Škoda	929	1938	SAR	2634	♥
Škoda	930	1938	SAR	2635	♥
Škoda	931	1938	SAR	2636	♥
Škoda	932	1938	SAR	2637	♥
Škoda	933	1938	SAR	2638	♥
Škoda	934	1938	SAR	2639	♥
Škoda	935	1938	SAR	2640	♥
Krupp	1821	1938	SAR	2641	♣
Krupp	1822	1938	SAR	2642	♣
Krupp	1823	1938	SAR	2643	♣
Krupp	1824	1938	SAR	2644	♣
Krupp	1825	1938	SAR	2645	♣
Krupp	1826	1938	SAR	2646	♣
Krupp	1827	1938	SAR	2647	♣
Krupp	1828	1938	SAR	2648	♣
Krupp	1829	1938	SAR	2649	♣
Krupp	1830	1938	SAR	2650	♣
Krupp	1831	1938	SAR	2651	♣
Krupp	1832	1938	SAR	2652	♣
Krupp	1833	1938	SAR	2653	♣
Krupp	1834	1938	SAR	2654	♣
Krupp	1835	1938	SAR	2655	♣
Krupp	1836	1938	SAR	2656	♣
Krupp	1837	1938	SAR	2657	♣
Krupp	1838	1938	SAR	2658	♣
Krupp	1839	1938	SAR	2659	♣
Krupp	1840	1938	SAR	2660	♣
Krupp	1841	1938	SAR	2661	♣
Krupp	1842	1938	SAR	2662	♣
Krupp	1843	1938	SAR	2663	♣
Krupp	1847	1939	SAR	2664	♣
Krupp	1848	1939	SAR	2665	♣
Krupp	1849	1939	SAR	2666	♣
Krupp	1850	1939	SAR	2667	♣
Krupp	1851	1939	SAR	2668	♣
Krupp	1852	1939	SAR	2669	♣
Krupp	1853	1939	SAR	2670	♣
Krupp	1854	1939	SAR	2671	♣
Krupp	1855	1939	SAR	2672	♣
Krupp	1856	1939	SAR	2673	♣
Krupp	1857	1939	SAR	2674	♣
Krupp	1858	1939	SAR	2675	♣
Krupp	1859	1939	SAR	2676	♣
Krupp	1860	1939	SAR	2677	♣
Krupp	1861	1939	SAR	2678	♣
Krupp	1862	1939	SAR	2679	♣
Krupp	1863	1939	SAR	2680	♣
Borsig	14732	1938	SAR	2681	♦
Borsig	14733	1938	SAR	2682	♦
Borsig	14734	1938	SAR	2683	♦
Borsig	14735	1938	SAR	2684	♦
Borsig	14736	1938	SAR	2685	♦
Borsig	14737	1938	SAR	2686	♦
Borsig	14738	1938	SAR	2687	♦
Borsig	14739	1938	SAR	2688	♦
Borsig	14740	1938	SAR	2689	♦
Borsig	14741	1938	SAR	2690	♦
Borsig	14742	1938	SAR	2691	♦
Borsig	14743	1938	SAR	2692	♦ Locomotive involved in 1992 Barkly East Branch railway accident
Borsig	14744	1938	SAR	2693	♦
Borsig	14745	1938	SAR	2694	♦
Borsig	14746	1938	SAR	2695	♦
Borsig	14747	1938	SAR	2696	♦
Borsig	14748	1938	SAR	2697	♦
Borsig	14749	1938	SAR	2698	♦
Borsig	14750	1938	SAR	2699	♦
Borsig	14751	1938	SAR	2700	♦
Borsig	14752	1938	SAR	2701	♦
Borsig	14753	1938	SAR	2702	♦
Borsig	14754	1938	SAR	2703	♦
Borsig	14755	1938	SAR	2704	♦
Borsig	14756	1938	SAR	2705	♦
Borsig	14757	1938	SAR	2706	♦
Borsig	14758	1938	SAR	2707	♦
Borsig	14759	1938	SAR	2708	♦
Borsig	14760	1938	SAR	2709	♦
Borsig	14761	1938	SAR	2710	♦
Borsig	14762	1938	SAR	2711	♦
Borsig	14763	1938	SAR	2712	♦
Borsig	14764	1938	SAR	2713	♦
Borsig	14765	1938	SAR	2714	♦
Borsig	14766	1938	SAR	2715	♦
Borsig	14767	1938	SAR	2716	♦
Borsig	14768	1938	SAR	2717	♦
Borsig	14769	1938	SAR	2718	♦
Borsig	14770	1938	SAR	2719	♦
Borsig	14771	1938	SAR	2720	♦
RSH	7191	1945	SAR	2721	ʘ
RSH	7192	1945	SAR	2722	ʘ
RSH	7193	1945	SAR	2723	ʘ
RSH	7194	1945	SAR	2724	ʘ
RSH	7195	1945	SAR	2725	ʘ
RSH	7196	1945	SAR	2726	ʘ
RSH	7197	1945	SAR	2727	ʘ
RSH	7198	1945	SAR	2728	ʘ
RSH	7199	1945	SAR	2729	ʘ
RSH	7200	1945	SAR	2730	ʘ
RSH	7244	1945	SAR	2731	ʘ
RSH	7245	1945	SAR	2732	ʘ
RSH	7246	1945	SAR	2733	ʘ
RSH	7360	1945	SAR	2734	ʘ RSH 7247's replacement
RSH	7248	1945	SAR	2735	ʘ
RSH	7249	1945	SAR	2736	ʘ
RSH	7250	1945	SAR	2737	ʘ
RSH	7251	1945	SAR	2738	ʘ
RSH	7252	1945	SAR	2739	ʘ
RSH	7253	1945	SAR	2740	ʘ
RSH	7254	1945	SAR	2741	ʘ
RSH	7255	1945	SAR	2742	ʘ
RSH	7256	1945	SAR	2743	ʘ
RSH	7257	1945	SAR	2744	ʘ
RSH	7258	1945	SAR	2745	ʘ
RSH	7259	1945	SAR	2746	ʘ
RSH	7260	1945	SAR	2747	ʘ
RSH	7261	1945	SAR	2748	ʘ
RSH	7262	1945	SAR	2749	ʘ
RSH	7263	1945	SAR	2750	ʘ
RSH	7264	1945	SAR	2751	ʘ
RSH	7265	1945	SAR	2752	ʘ
RSH	7266	1945	SAR	2753	ʘ
RSH	7267	1945	SAR	2754	ʘ
RSH	7268	1945	SAR	2755	ʘ
RSH	7269	1945	SAR	2756	ʘ
RSH	7270	1945	SAR	2757	ʘ
RSH	7271	1945	SAR	2758	ʘ
RSH	7272	1945	SAR	2759	ʘ
RSH	7273	1945	SAR	2760	ʘ
RSH	7274	1945	SAR	2761	ʘ
RSH	7275	1945	SAR	2762	ʘ
RSH	7276	1945	SAR	2763	ʘ
RSH	7277	1945	SAR	2764	ʘ
RSH	7278	1945	SAR	2765	ʘ
RSH	7279	1945	SAR	2766	ʘ
RSH	7280	1945	SAR	2767	ʘ
RSH	7281	1945	SAR	2768	ʘ
RSH	7282	1945	SAR	2769	ʘ
RSH	7283	1945	SAR	2770	ʘ
NBL	26041	1948	SAR	3321	ʘ
NBL	26042	1948	SAR	3322	ʘ
NBL	26043	1948	SAR	3323	ʘ
NBL	26044	1948	SAR	3324	ʘ
NBL	26045	1948	SAR	3325	ʘ
NBL	26046	1948	SAR	3326	ʘ
NBL	26047	1948	SAR	3327	ʘ
NBL	26048	1948	SAR	3328	ʘ
NBL	26049	1948	SAR	3329	ʘ
NBL	26050	1948	SAR	3330	ʘ
NBL	26051	1948	SAR	3331	ʘ
NBL	26052	1948	SAR	3332	ʘ
NBL	26053	1948	SAR	3333	ʘ
NBL	26054	1948	SAR	3334	ʘ
NBL	26055	1948	SAR	3335	ʘ
NBL	26056	1948	SAR	3336	ʘ
NBL	26057	1948	SAR	3337	ʘ
NBL	26058	1948	SAR	3338	ʘ
NBL	26059	1948	SAR	3339	ʘ
NBL	26060	1948	SAR	3340	ʘ
NBL	26061	1948	SAR	3341	ʘ
NBL	26062	1948	SAR	3342	ʘ
NBL	26063	1948	SAR	3343	ʘ
NBL	26064	1948	SAR	3344	ʘ
NBL	26065	1948	SAR	3345	ʘ
NBL	26066	1948	SAR	3346	ʘ
NBL	26067	1948	SAR	3347	ʘ
NBL	26068	1948	SAR	3348	ʘ
NBL	26069	1948	SAR	3349	ʘ
NBL	26070	1948	SAR	3350	ʘ
NBL	26071	1948	SAR	3351	ʘ
NBL	26072	1948	SAR	3352	ʘ
NBL	26073	1948	SAR	3353	ʘ
NBL	26074	1948	SAR	3354	ʘ
NBL	26075	1948	SAR	3355	ʘ
NBL	26076	1948	SAR	3356	ʘ
NBL	26077	1948	SAR	3357	ʘ
NBL	26078	1948	SAR	3358	ʘ
NBL	26079	1948	SAR	3359	ʘ
NBL	26080	1948	SAR	3360	ʘ
NBL	26081	1948	SAR	3361	ʘ
NBL	26082	1948	SAR	3362	ʘ
NBL	26083	1948	SAR	3363	ʘ
NBL	26084	1948	SAR	3364	ʘ
NBL	26085	1948	SAR	3365	ʘ
NBL	26086	1948	SAR	3366	ʘ
NBL	26087	1948	SAR	3367	ʘ
NBL	26088	1948	SAR	3368	ʘ
NBL	26089	1948	SAR	3369	ʘ
NBL	26090	1948	SAR	3370	ʘ
NBL	26959	1951	CFB	401	
NBL	26960	1951	CFB	402	
NBL	26961	1951	CFB	403	
NBL	26962	1951	CFB	404	
NBL	26963	1951	CFB	405	
NBL	26964	1951	CFB	406	
Henschel	27386	1951	RR	316	
Henschel	27387	1951	RR	317	
Henschel	27388	1951	RR	318	
Henschel	27389	1951	RR	319	
Henschel	27390	1952	RR	320	
Henschel	27391	1952	RR	321	
Henschel	27392	1952	RR	322	
Henschel	27393	1952	RR	323	
Henschel	27394	1952	RR	324	
Henschel	27395	1952	RR	325	
Henschel	27396	1952	RR	326	
Henschel	27397	1952	RR	327	
Henschel	27398	1952	RR	328	
Henschel	27399	1952	RR	329	
Henschel	27400	1952	RR	330	
Henschel	27401	1952	RR	331	
Henschel	27402	1952	RR	332	
Henschel	27403	1952	RR	333	
Henschel	27404	1952	RR	334	
Henschel	27405	1952	RR	335	
Henschel	27409	1952	Nkana	107	RR Class 19B no. 337
Henschel	27410	1952	Nkana	108	RR Class 19B no. 338
Henschel	27411	1953	RR	336	RR Class 19C
NBL	27557	1955	Wankie	1	
NBL	27558	1955	Wankie	2	
NBL	27559	1955	Wankie	3	
NBL	27560	1955	Wankie	4	
