= 1992 Barkly East Branch railway accident =

1992 train derailment in Eastern Cape, South Africa

Coordinates: 30.7993905°S 27.2068315°E

The Barkly East Branch railway accident occurred on 10 October 1992 during the annual Lady Grey Spring Festival in the Eastern Cape, South Africa. The accident, involving a South African Class 19D 2692 steam locomotive, led to multiple fatalities and injuries and had lasting consequences for rail operations in the region.

== Background ==
As part of the festival's entertainment, a race was organised between a train and runners along the line between Melk siding and Lady Grey. The train, pulled by Class 19D 2692, was operated by NOKSpoor (Noord-Oos Kaap Spoor), a rail operator in the Eastern Cape.

== The Accident ==
On the train's return journey to Lady Grey, an intoxicated passenger illegally entered the locomotive cab. Pushing the driver aside, the passenger took control of the engine and recklessly increased the train's speed, ignoring the 30 km/h speed restriction posted for that section of the track. As the train sped up to 76 km/h, it entered a sharp curve, causing the locomotive and five coaches to derail in a curved cutting.

The first coach, located directly behind the locomotive, was crushed during the derailment. Five people were killed instantly, including the Lady Grey station master, his wife, and three children from the local area. Four days after the accident, the engine driver succumbed to his injuries, bringing the total fatalities to six. In addition, 38 people sustained injuries, some of them serious.

== Aftermath ==
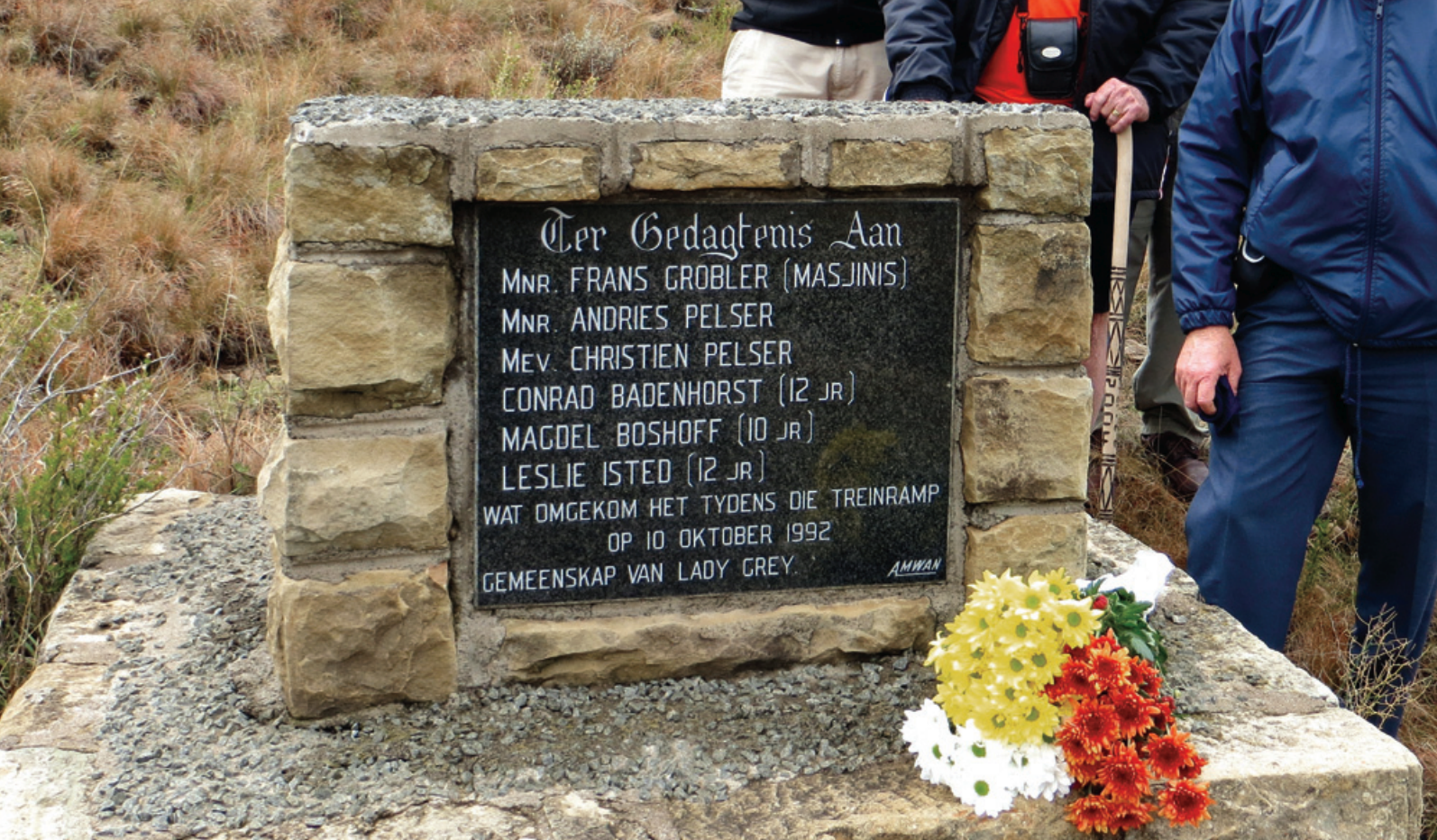
Memorial to the victims of the 10 October 1992 railway accident.

The derailment shocked the local community and led to a formal Inquiry by Spoornet, the national railway operator. The Inquiry found significant safety violations, including the unauthorized presence of passengers on the locomotive footplate, which exacerbated the severity of the accident. These findings were heavily criticised, and the accident led to heightened scrutiny of safety practices on heritage railway operations.

Following the accident, a memorial was erected at the site of the derailment to honour those who lost their lives. Additionally, the event had far-reaching effects on heritage railway operations, making it difficult to obtain insurance for future steam excursions at reasonable rates.

== Closure of the Line ==
On 10 October 2001, exactly nine years after the derailment, Bushveld Train Safaris operated a commemorative passenger train along the line, marking the final passenger service on the Barkly East Branch. After this, the line was closed to all rail traffic, bringing an end to its operation.

== Legacy ==
The 1992 accident had a significant impact on the operation of heritage steam trains in the region and contributed to the eventual closure of the Barkly East Branch. The closure marked the end of an era for steam railway enthusiasts and the communities once served by the line.
