= South African type MY1 tender =

Steam locomotive tender

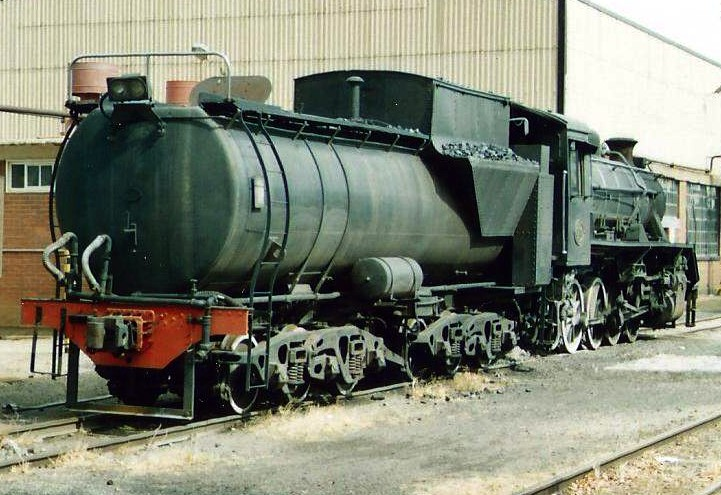
- Type MY1 tender on Class S2, 1990
Type and origin
- Locomotive: Class S2
- Designer: South African Railways (L.C. Grubb)
- Builder: Friedrich Krupp AG
- In service: 1952-1953
Specifications
- Configuration: 3-axle bogies
- Gauge: 3 ft 6 in (1,067 mm) Cape gauge
- Bogies: Buckeye
- Wheel dia.: 34 in (864 mm)
- Wheelbase: 24 ft 7 1/4 in (7,499 mm)
  - Bogie: 8 ft 8 in (2,642 mm)
- Axle load: 8 LT 18 cwt 2 qtr (9,068 kg)
  - Front bogie: 26 LT 15 cwt 2 qtr (27,200 kg)
  - Rear bogie: 26 LT 12 cwt 2 qtr (27,050 kg)
- Weight w/o: 53 LT 8 cwt (54,260 kg)
- Fuel type: Coal
- Fuel cap.: 8 LT (8.1 t)
- Water cap.: 4,200 imp gal (19,100 L)
- Stoking: Manual
- Couplers: Drawbar & AAR knuckle
Career
- Operators: South African Railways
- Numbers: SAR 3701-3800
- Nicknames: Torpedo

The South African type MY1 tender was a steam locomotive tender.

Type MY1 tenders entered service in 1952 and 1953, as tenders to the Class S2 0-8-0 shunting steam locomotives which entered service on the South African Railways in those years.

== Manufacturer ==
Type MY1 tenders were built in 1952 and 1953 by Friedrich Krupp AG of Essen in Germany.

The Class S2 0-8-0 steam locomotive was designed by L.C. Grubb, Chief Mechanical Engineer of the South African Railways (SAR) from 1949 to 1954, as a shunting locomotive with a light axle load for harbour work where most of the trackwork was laid with light rail. The Type MY1 entered service as tenders to these locomotives.

== Characteristics ==
The tender had a coal capacity of 8 long tons (8.1 tonnes), a water capacity of 4,200 imperial gallons (19,100 litres) and a maximum axle loading of 8 long tons 18 hundredweight 2 quarters (9,068 kilograms). It was a tank wagon type tender with a cylindrical water tank, similar in appearance to the North American Vanderbilt type tender. The SAR's Types MX, MY and MY1 tenders with their cylindrical water tanks all became commonly known as Torpedo tenders.

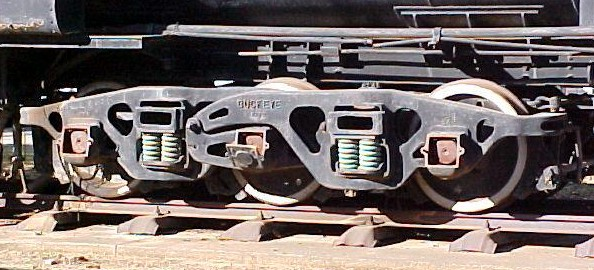
Buckeye bogie

Like the Type CL, Type MX and Type MY tenders, it rode on three-axle Buckeye bogies to reduce the axle load.

While the tender was similar in general appearance and dimensions and had the same wheelbase as the Type MY tender of the Class 24, it had a different coal bunker top design. As was done with the tenders of the Classes S and S1 shunting locomotives, the top sides of the coal bunker were scalloped out to improve the crew's rearward field of vision.

== Locomotive ==
Only the Class S2 locomotives were delivered new with Type MY1 tenders, which were numbered in the range from 3701 to 3800 for their engines. An oval number plate, bearing the engine number and often also the tender type, was attached to the rear end of the tenders.

Most of the Class S2 locomotives were placed in shunting service in the Durban, Table Bay and Port Elizabeth harbours, while some were also allocated to yards on the Witwatersrand and in the Eastern Transvaal.

== Classification letters ==
Since many tender types are interchangeable between different locomotive classes and types, a tender classification system was adopted by the SAR. The first letter of the tender type indicates the classes of engines to which it could be coupled. The "M_" tenders could be used with the locomotive classes as shown, although in some cases, engine drawbars and intermediate emergency chains had to be replaced or adjusted to suit the target locomotive.

- Class 12, Class 12A and Class 12B.
- Class 14, Class 14A and Class 14B.
- Class 15 and Class 15A.
- Class 16, Class 16A, Class 16B and Class 16C.
- Class 19, Class 19A, Class 19B, Class 19C and Class 19D.
- Class 20.
- Class 24.
- Class MC1, Class MH and Class MJ.
- Class S2.

The second letter indicates the tender's water capacity, while a number, when added after the letter code, indicates differences between similar tender types, such as function, wheelbase or coal bunker capacity. The "_Y1" tenders had a capacity of 4,200 imperial gallons (19,100 litres; 5,040 US gallons).
