= South African type MT tender =

Steam locomotive tender in South Africa

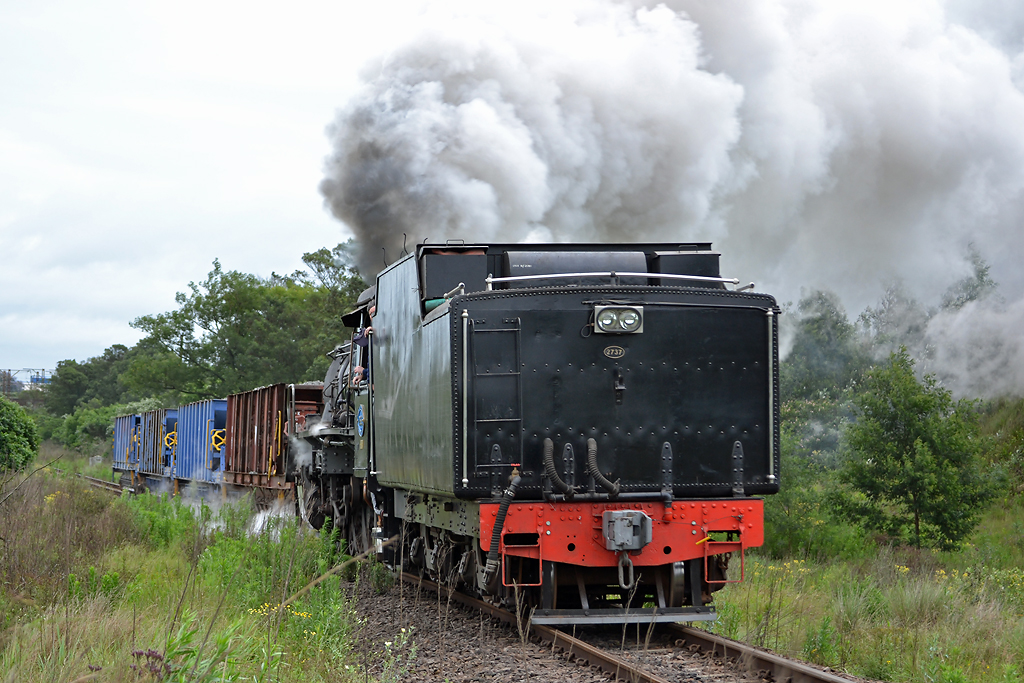
- Type MT tender no. 2737 on Class 19D, 2012
Type and origin
- Locomotive: Class 12A, Class 19B, Class 19C, Class 19D
- Designer: South African Railways (Col F.R. Collins DSO)
- Builder: Berliner Maschinenbau; Borsig Lokomotiv Werke; Henschel and Son; Friedrich Krupp AG; North British Locomotive Company; Robert Stephenson & Hawthorns; Škoda Works
- In service: 1928–1945
- Rebuilder: South African Railways
- Rebuild date: 1945–1948
- Rebuilt to: Type MT1, Type MT2
Specifications
- Configuration: 2-axle bogies
- Gauge: 3 ft 6 in (1,067 mm) Cape gauge
- Length: 27 ft 5 3/8 in (8,366 mm)
- Wheel dia.: 34 in (864 mm)
- Wheelbase: 20 ft 5 in (6,223 mm)
  - Bogie: 6 ft 2 in (1,880 mm)
- Axle load: 16 LT 11 cwt (16,820 kg)
  - Front bogie: 32 LT 18 cwt (33,430 kg)
  - Rear bogie: 33 LT 2 cwt (33,630 kg)
- Weight empty: 61,520 lb (27,910 kg)
- Weight w/o: 66 LT (67,060 kg)
- Fuel type: Coal
- Fuel cap.: 12 LT (12.2 t)
- Water cap.: 6,000 imp gal (27,300 L)
- Stoking: Manual
- Couplers: Drawbar & AAR knuckle
Career
- Operators: South African Railways
- Numbers: SAR 1401–1414, 1540-1550, 2103-2110, 2126-2138, 2435–2484, 2506-2545, 2626-2770, N47-N57

The South African type MT tender was a steam locomotive tender.

Type MT tenders entered service between 1928 and 1945, as tenders to the Classes 12A, 19B, 19C and 19D 4-8-2 Mountain type steam locomotives which were placed in service by the South African Railways during that period.

== Manufacturers ==
Type MT tenders were built between 1928 and 1945 by Berliner Maschinenbau, Borsig Lokomotiv Werke, Henschel and Son, Friedrich Krupp AG, North British Locomotive Company (NBL), Robert Stephenson and Hawthorns, and Škoda Works.

The South African Railways (SAR) placed 67 Class 12A 4-8-2 Mountain type locomotives in service between 1919 and 1929, built by North British and Henschel. The engines were designed by D.A. Hendrie, Chief Mechanical Engineer (CME) of the SAR from 1910 to 1922. The locomotives were delivered in five batches and with two tender types, the Type MP1 in 1919 and 1921 and the Type MT in 1928 and 1929. The design of the Type MT tender was by Hendrie's successor, Colonel F.R. Collins DSO, the CME from 1922 to 1929.

The official SAR tender diagrams show the Type MT tender as having first entered service in 1919, but builder's pictures of the North British-built Class 12A no. 1520 of 1919 and no. 2111 of 1921 show them with Type MP1 tenders. Builder's pictures of Henschel-built Class 12A no. 1543 of 1928 and North British-built no. 2131 of 1929 show the engines with Type MT tenders. It would therefore appear that Type MT tenders first entered service in 1928, not 1919.

== Characteristics ==
The Type MT tender had a coal capacity of 12 long tons (12.2 tonnes), a water capacity of 6,000 imperial gallons (27,300 litres) and an axle loading of 16 long tons 11 hundredweight (16,820 kilograms).

== Locomotives ==
Four locomotive classes, built by seven manufacturers, were delivered new with Type MT tenders, which were numbered for their engines in the number ranges as shown. An oval number plate, bearing the engine number and often also the tender type, was attached to the rear end of the tender. In addition, eleven spare Type MT tenders were built new and numbered in the range from N47 to N57.

- 1928 and 1929: Class 12A, numbers 1540 to 1550, 2103 to 2110 and 2126 to 2138.
- 1930: Class 19B, numbers 1401 to 1414.
- 1935: Class 19C, numbers 2435 to 2484.
- 1937 to 1945: Class 19D, numbers 2506 to 2545 and 2626 to 2770.

The Classes 19B and 19C and most of the Class 19D were delivered with these high-capacity tenders, even though the axle loading of these tenders exceeded the permissible limits on the branchlines for which the Classes 19 were intended. Upon delivery, their new Type MT tenders were exchanged for the smaller modified Type MP1 tenders from many of the reboilered mainline locomotives. The Type MP1 had a lighter axle load of 13 long tons 15 hundredweight (13,970 kilograms) and was therefore more suitable for branchline work. This policy was followed with all the Classes 19B, 19C and 19D upon delivery, except the last batch of Class 19D which were delivered with Type MX torpedo tenders.

== Classification letters ==
Since many tender types are interchangeable between different locomotive classes and types, a tender classification system was adopted by the SAR. The first letter of the tender type indicates the classes of engines to which it could be coupled. The "M_" tenders could be used with the locomotive classes as shown, although in some cases, engine drawbars and intermediate emergency chains had to be replaced or adjusted to suit the target locomotive.

- Class 12, Class 12A and Class 12B.
- Class 14, Class 14A and Class 14B.
- Class 15 and Class 15A.
- Class 16, Class 16A, Class 16B and Class 16C.
- Class 19, Class 19A, Class 19B, Class 19C and Class 19D.
- Class 20.
- Class 24.
- Class MC1, Class MH and Class MJ.
- Class S2.

The second letter indicates the tender's water capacity. The "_T" tenders had a capacity of between 5,587 and 6,000 imperial gallons (25,400 and 27,300 litres; 6,710 and 7,210 US gallons).

A number, when added after the letter code, indicates differences between similar tender types, such as function, wheelbase or coal bunker capacity.

== Modifications ==
On the original Type MT tenders, as built, the raised part of the tender sides are approximately two-thirds of the tender's length. Several of these tenders were reclassified after being modified by enlarging their coal bunkers. Those which had their bunkers enlarged to a 13 long tons (13.2 tonnes) coal capacity were reclassified to Type MT1, while those which had their bunkers enlarged to a 14 long tons (14.2 tonnes) coal capacity were reclassified to Type MT2.

== Illustration ==
Builder's pictures of four of the Class 12A locomotive batches show them with the two tender types with which they were delivered, Type MP1 until 1921 and Type MT from 1928. The last three pictures serve to illustrate the difference in appearance between the Types MT, MT1 and MT2 versions.

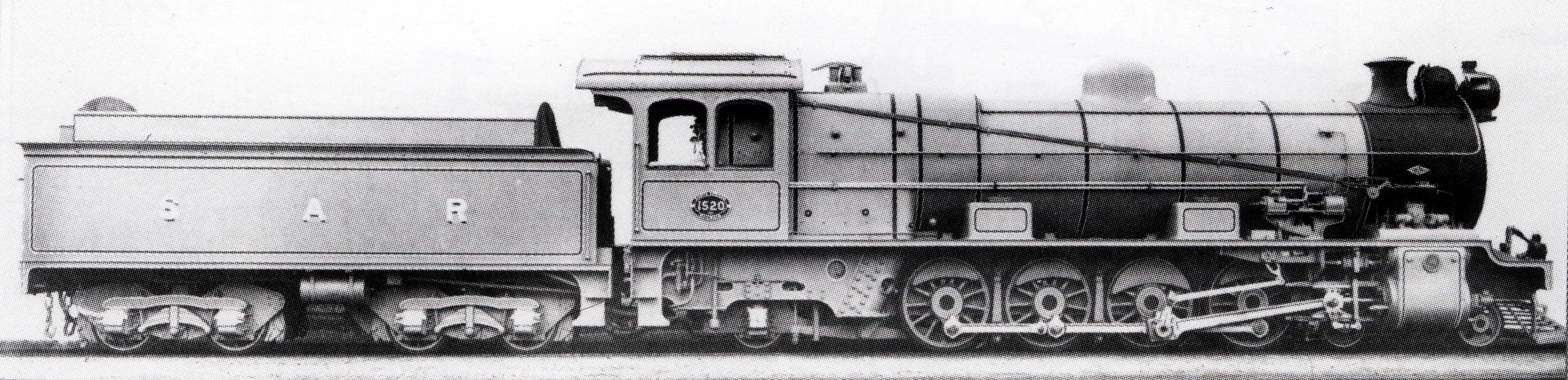
Type MP1 on NBL-built no. 1520, c. 1919

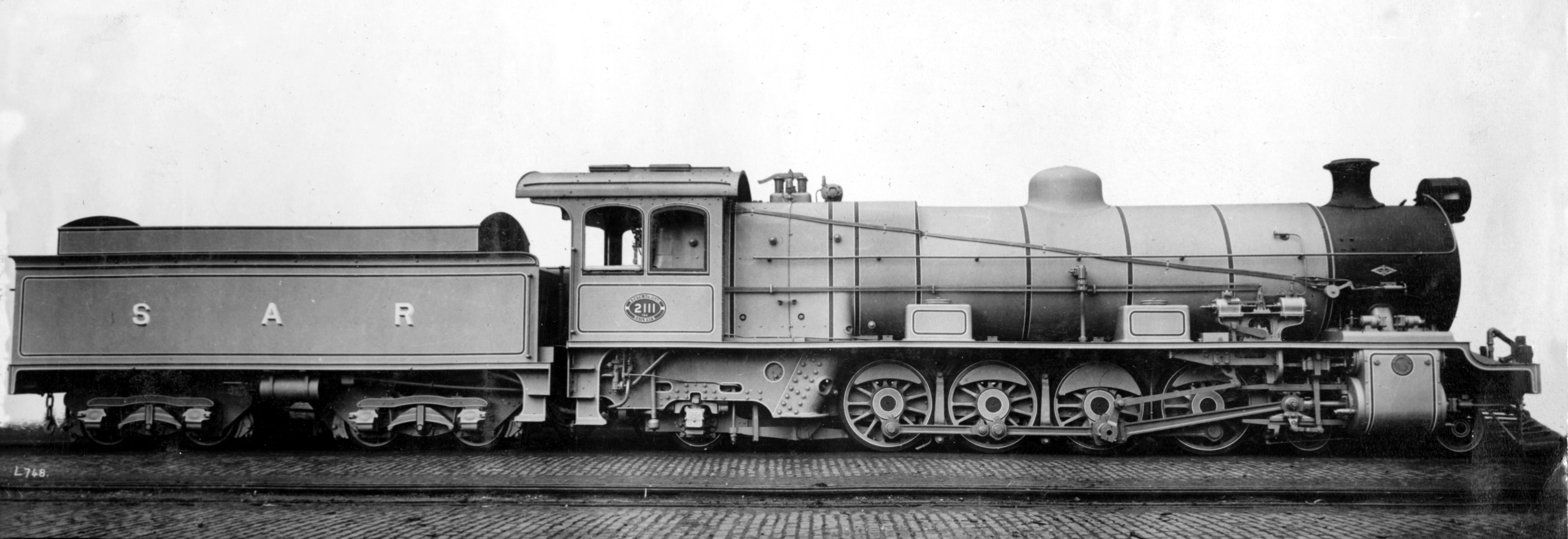
Type MP1 on NBL's no. 2111, c. 1921
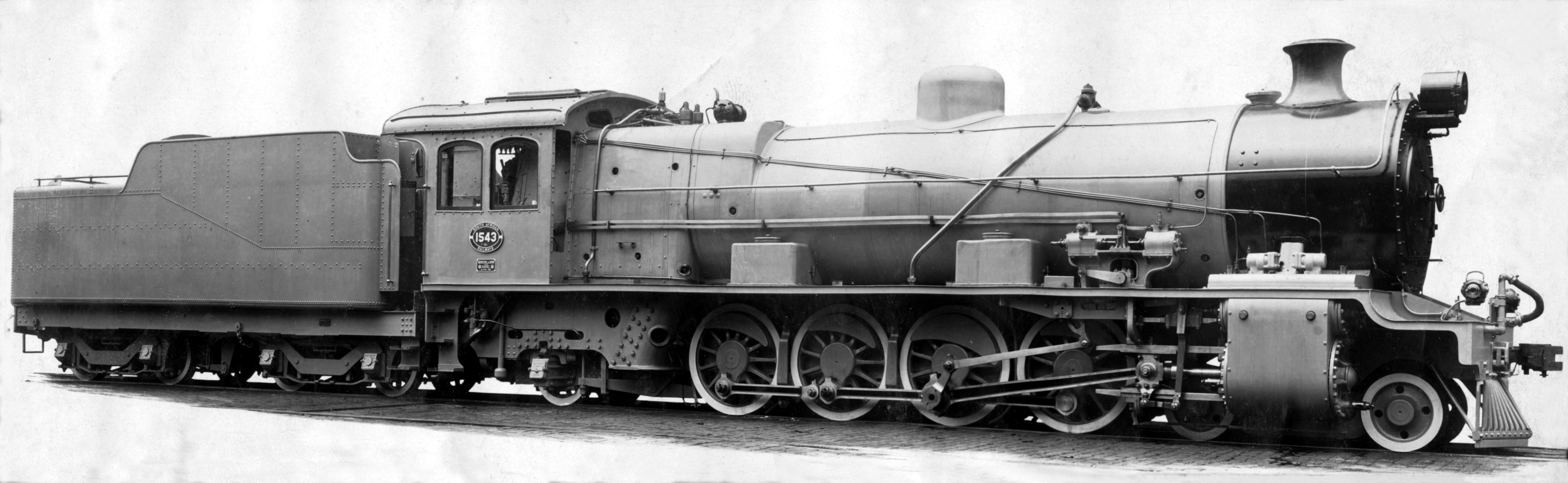
Type MT on Henschel-built no. 1543, c. 1928

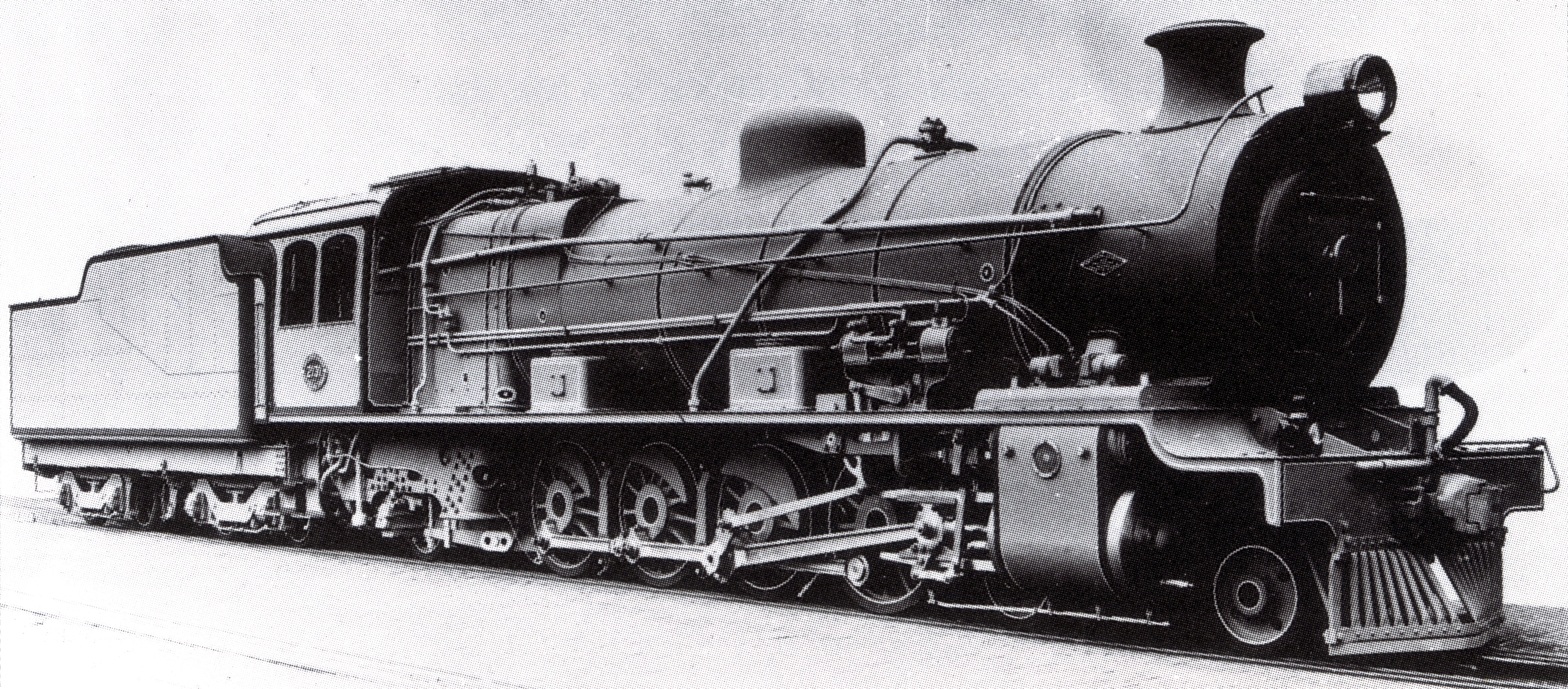
Type MT on NBL-built no. 2131, c. 1929

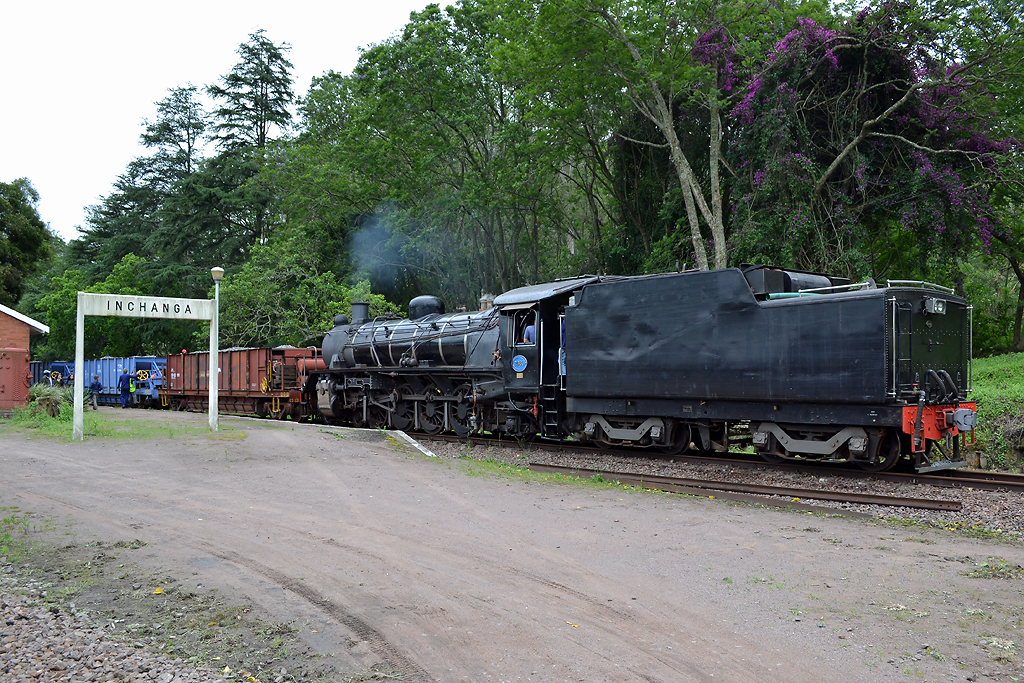
Type MT on Class 19D, 2012.

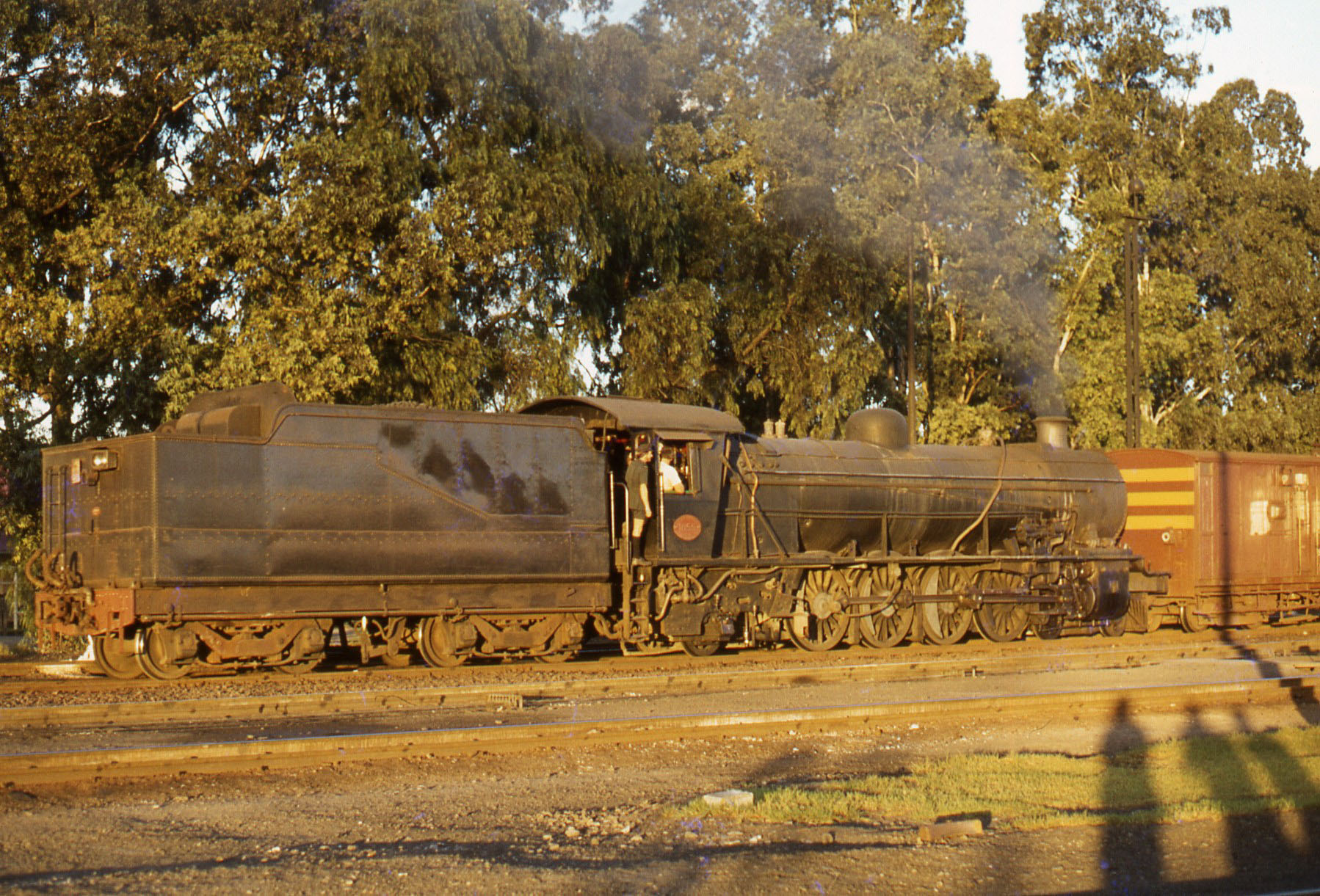
Type MT1 on Class 15AR, 1979

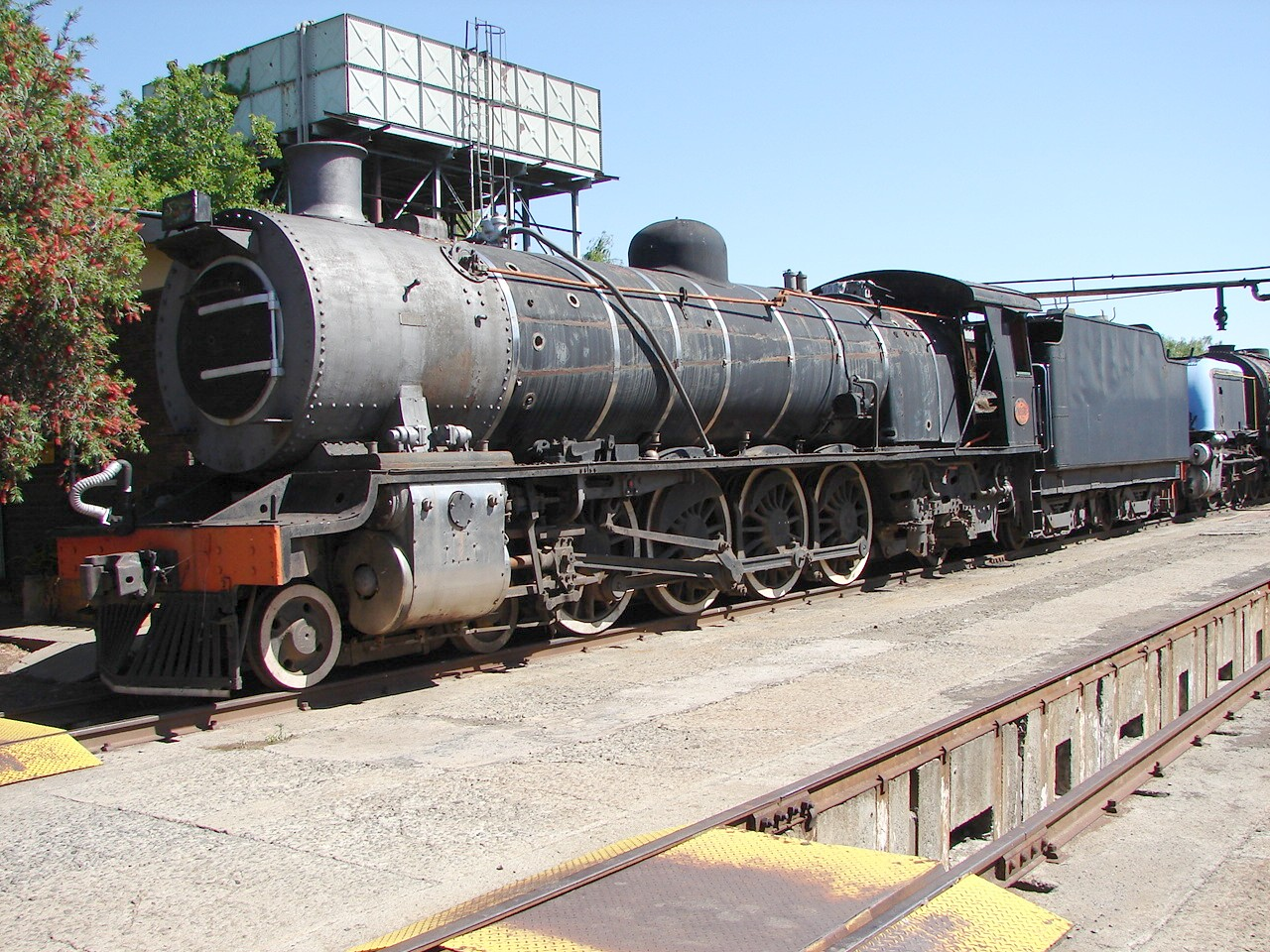
MT2 no. 2723 on 15AR no. 1850, 2009
