= South African Class 14R 4-8-2 =

South African Class 14R 4-8-2 may refer to one of the following steam locomotive classes that were reclassified to Class 14R after being reboilered with Watson Standard no. 2 boilers:

- South African Class 14 4-8-2
- South African Class 14A 4-8-2
- South African Class 14B 4-8-2
