= South African Class 12B 4-8-2 =

1920 design of steam locomotive

South African Class 12B & 12R 4-8-2
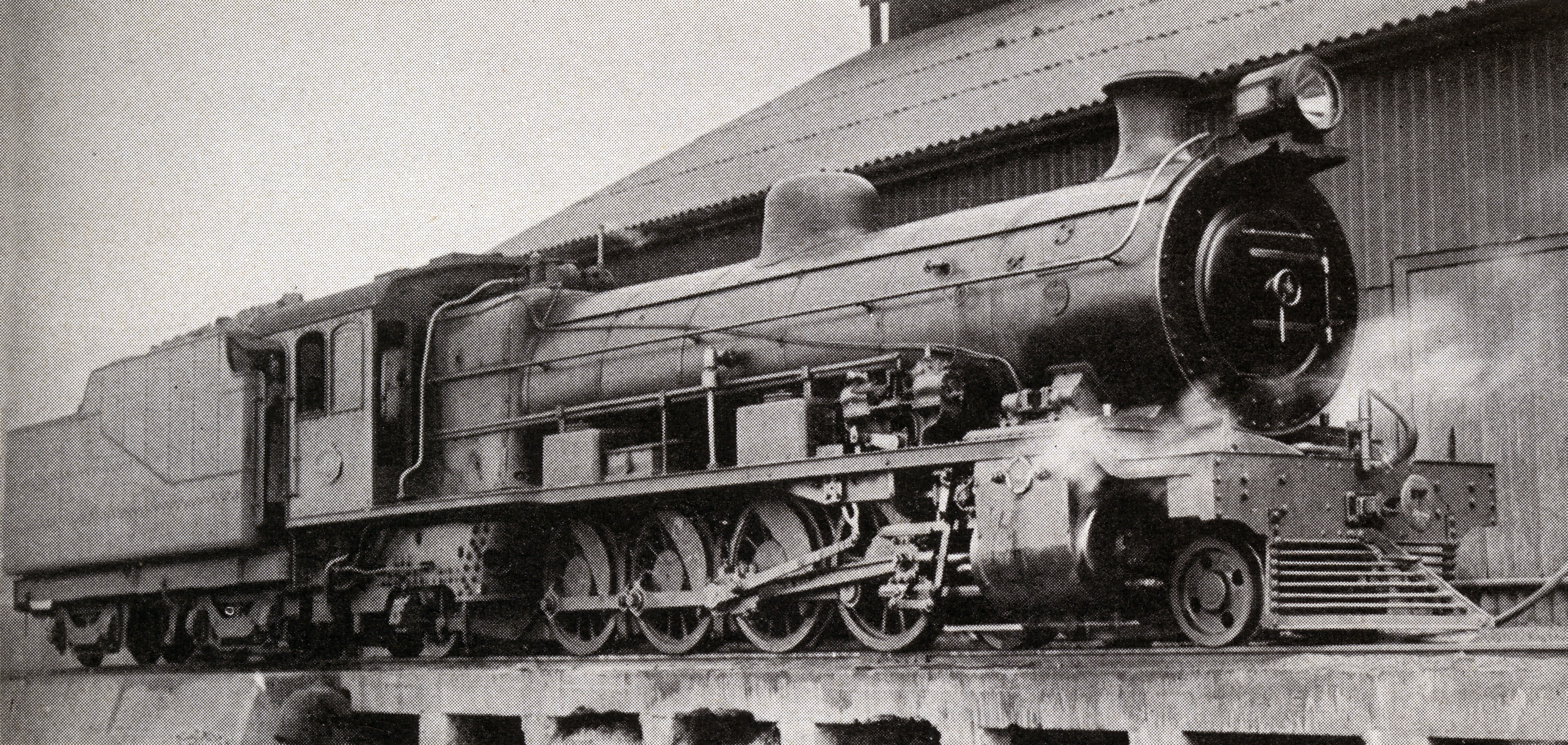
- Class 12R no. 1931 at Port Elizabeth sheds, with Belpaire firebox, c. 1930
Type and origin
- ♠ Class 12B as built with a Belpaire firebox ♥ Class 12R rebuilt with a Watson Standard boiler
- Power type: Steam
- Designer: South African Railways (D.A. Hendrie)
- Builder: Baldwin Locomotive Works
- Serial number: 52476, 52558-52559, 52583-52584, 52649-52651, 52690-52693, 52712-52713, 52723-52724, 52754-52767
- Model: Class 12B
- Build date: 1920
- Total produced: 30
Specifications
- Configuration
  - Whyte: 4-8-2 (Mountain)
  - UIC: ♠ 2′D1’n2 – ♥ 2′D1’h2
- Driver: 2nd coupled axle
- Gauge: 3 ft 6 in (1,067 mm) Cape gauge
- Leading dia.: 28 1/2 in (724 mm)
- Coupled dia.: 51 in (1,295 mm)
- Trailing dia.: 33 in (838 mm)
- Tender wheels: 34 in (864 mm)
- Wheelbase: 58 ft 3 3/4 in (17,774 mm)
  - Engine: 31 ft 9 1/2 in (9,690 mm)
  - Leading: 6 ft 2 in (1,880 mm)
  - Coupled: 13 ft 6 in (4,115 mm)
  - Tender: 16 ft 9 in (5,105 mm)
  - Tender bogie: 4 ft 7 in (1,397 mm)
- Length
  - Over couplers: 66 ft 8 in (20,320 mm)
- Height: ♠ 12 ft 10 in (3,912 mm) ♥ 12 ft 7 1/2 in (3,848 mm)
- Frame type: Plate
- Axle load: ♠ 16 LT 15 cwt (17,020 kg) ♥ 17 LT 9 cwt (17,730 kg)
  - Leading: ♠ 15 LT 13 cwt (15,900 kg) ♥ 16 LT 2 cwt (16,360 kg)
  - 1st coupled: ♠ 16 LT 13 cwt (16,920 kg) ♥ 16 LT 15 cwt (17,020 kg)
  - 2nd coupled: ♠ 16 LT 15 cwt (17,020 kg) ♥ 17 LT 9 cwt (17,730 kg)
  - 3rd coupled: ♠ 16 LT 14 cwt (16,970 kg) ♥ 16 LT 17 cwt (17,120 kg)
  - 4th coupled: ♠ 16 LT 15 cwt (17,020 kg) ♥ 16 LT 15 cwt (17,020 kg)
  - Trailing: ♠ 12 LT 4 cwt (12,400 kg) ♥ 11 LT 16 cwt (11,990 kg)
  - Tender bogie: Bogie 1: 27 LT 10 cwt (27,940 kg); Bogie 2: 23 LT 11 cwt (23,930 kg)
  - Tender axle: 13 LT 15 cwt (13,970 kg)
- Adhesive weight: ♠ 66 LT 17 cwt (67,920 kg) ♥ 67 LT 16 cwt (68,890 kg)
- Loco weight: ♠ 94 LT 14 cwt (96,220 kg) ♥ 95 LT 14 cwt (97,240 kg)
- Tender weight: 51 LT 1 cwt (51,870 kg)
- Total weight: ♠ 145 LT 15 cwt (148,100 kg) ♥ 146 LT 15 cwt (149,100 kg)
- Tender type: MP1 (2-axle bogies); MP, MP1, MR, MS, MT, MT1, MT2, MX, MY, MY1 permitted
- Fuel type: Coal
- Fuel capacity: 10 LT (10,160 kg)
- Water cap.: 4,250 imp gal (19,300 L)
- Firebox
  - Type: ♠ Belpaire – ♥ Round-top
  - Grate area: ♠ 40 sq ft (3.7 m^{2}) ♥ 37 sq ft (3.4 m^{2})
- Boiler
  - Model: Watson Standard no. 2
  - Pitch: ♠ 7 ft 7 in (2,311 mm) ♥ 7 ft 8 1/4 in (2,343 mm)
  - Diameter: ♠♥ 5 ft 7 1/2 in (1,714 mm)
  - Tube plates: ♠ 20 ft (6,096 mm) ♥ 19 ft 4 in (5,893 mm) steel ♥ 19 ft 3 5/8 in (5,883 mm)
  - Small tubes: ♠ 139: 2 1/4 in (57 mm) ♥ 87: 2 1/2 in (64 mm)
  - Large tubes: ♠ 24: 5 1/2 in (140 mm) ♥ 30: 5 1/2 in (140 mm)
- Boiler pressure: ♠♥ 190 psi (1,310 kPa)
- Safety valve: ♠ Ramsbottom – ♥ Pop
- Heating surface
  - Firebox: ♠ 160 sq ft (15 m^{2}) ♥ 142 sq ft (13.2 m^{2})
  - Tubes: ♠ 2,328 sq ft (216.3 m^{2}) ♥ 1,933 sq ft (179.6 m^{2})
  - Total surface: ♠ 2,488 sq ft (231.1 m^{2}) ♥ 2,075 sq ft (192.8 m^{2})
- Superheater
  - Heating area: ♠ 574 sq ft (53.3 m^{2}) ♥ 492 sq ft (45.7 m^{2})
- Cylinders: Two
- Cylinder size: 22 1/2 in (572 mm) bore 26 in (660 mm) stroke
- Valve gear: Walschaerts
- Valve type: Piston
- Couplers: Johnston link-and-pin AAR knuckle (1930s)
Performance figures
- Tractive effort: ♠♥ 36,780 lbf (163.6 kN) @ 75%
Career
- Operators: South African Railways
- Class: Class 12B & 12R
- Number in class: 30
- Numbers: 1931–1960
- Delivered: 1920
- First run: 1920
- Withdrawn: c. 1984
- The leading coupled axle had flangeless wheels

The South African Railways Class 12B 4-8-2 of 1920 was a steam locomotive.

In 1920, the South African Railways placed thirty Class 12B steam locomotives with a 4-8-2 Mountain type wheel arrangement in service.

== Manufacturer ==
In May 1920, an additional thirty locomotives, built to the Class 12 design of SAR Chief Mechanical Engineer (CME) D.A. Hendrie, were delivered to the South African Railways (SAR) from Baldwin Locomotive Works in the United States of America. Most of them were erected in the SAR workshops, but a few were contracted to James Brown and Company at Durban for erection. Even though they were very similar to the second and subsequent orders of the Class 12 which was also designed specifically for the Midland System, they were classified separately as Class 12B and numbered in the range from 1931 to 1960. Like the Class 12, they were also built with plate frames, Walschaerts valve gear and Belpaire fireboxes.

== Classification ==
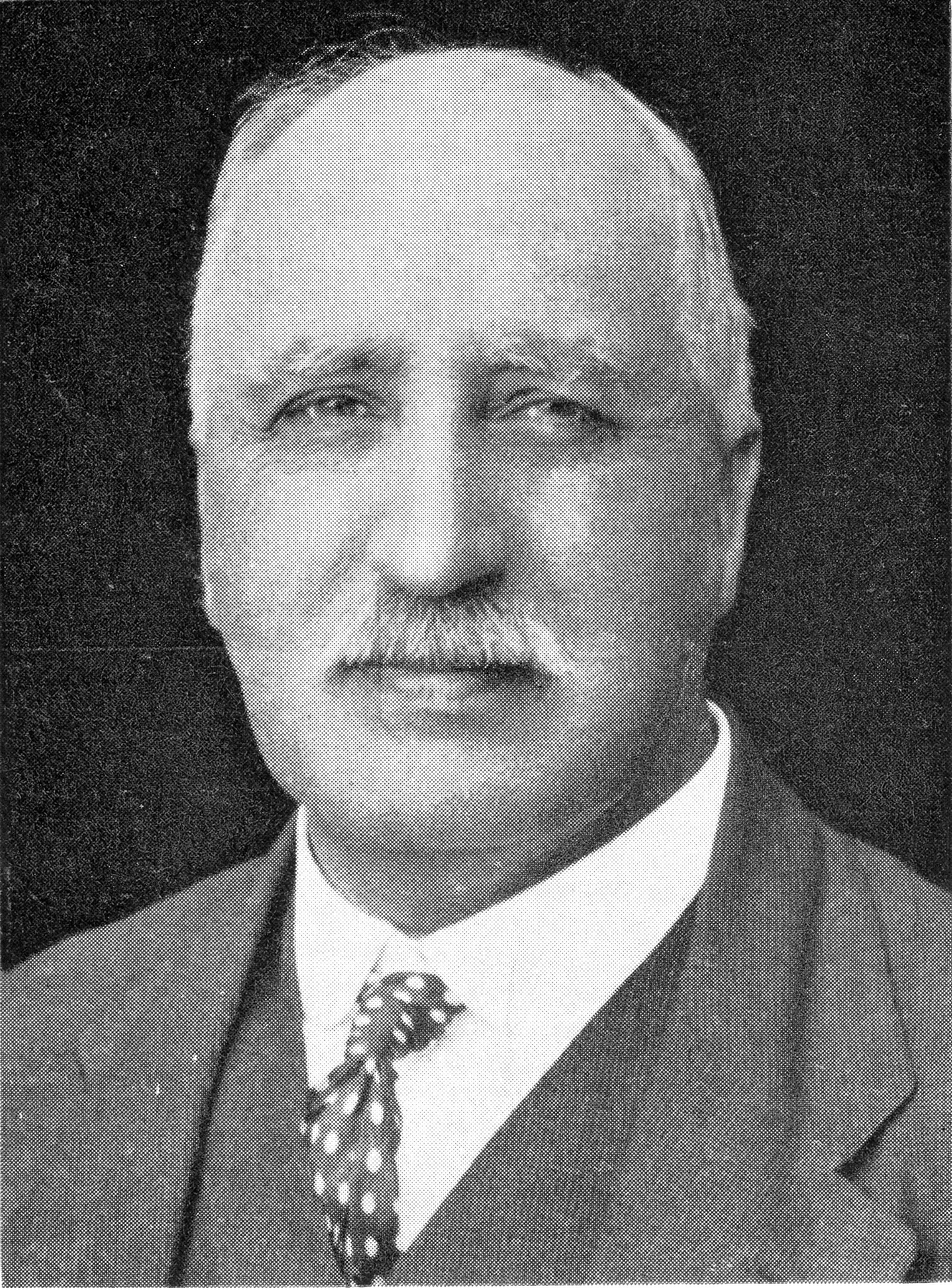
D.A. Hendrie

The separate 12B classification has been ascribed to the fact that the wheelbase of the leading bogie was 2 inches (51 millimetres) longer than on the original Class 12 locomotives. This was probably not the reason, bearing in mind that only the first eight out of altogether 46 Class 12 locomotives were built with leading bogies with a 6 feet (1,829 millimetres) wheelbase, while the other thirty-eight all had leading bogies with a 6 feet 2 inches (1,880 millimetres) wheelbase, the same as the Class 12B. More likely, the separate classification was simply based on the fact that the Class 12 was British-built while the Class 12B was American-built.

== Watson Standard boilers ==
During the 1930s, many serving locomotives were reboilered with a standard boiler type designed by then CME A.G. Watson as part of his standardisation policy. Such Watson Standard reboilered locomotives were reclassified by adding an "R" suffix to their classification.

All thirty Class 12B locomotives were eventually reboilered with Watson Standard no. 2 boilers. In the process, they were also equipped with Watson cabs with their distinctive slanted fronts, compared to the conventional vertical fronts of their original cabs. Upon reboilering, the unknown original reason for the separate classification was ignored and instead of becoming Class 12BR, the reboilered locomotives were reclassified to Class 12R along with the reboilered Class 12 locomotives.

Their original Belpaire saturated steam boilers were fitted with Ramsbottom safety valves, while the Watson Standard superheated steam boiler was fitted with Pop safety valves.

== Service ==
=== South African Railways ===
All thirty locomotives were placed in service on the Cape Midland to work on the mainline out of Port Elizabeth, where they largely remained until being withdrawn after more than sixty years in service. Even though they were not designed to be mixed traffic locomotives, they saw service on both passenger and goods working. Until the Class 15F arrived on the Midland, the mainline was ruled by these locomotives. Later, in spite of their small 51 inches (1,295 millimetres) diameter coupled wheels, they were comfortable at 60 miles per hour (97 kilometres per hour) when employed on the mainline in tandem with the larger Class 15F.

The Class 12Rs saw mainline work until well into 1969, when the arrival of new Class 33-400 diesel-electrics brought almost fifty years of mainline service to an end. The entire Class gave more than fifty years of service before the first one was withdrawn.

Even in their twilight years, these locomotives still saw mainline service on the Klipplaat run and as local goods haulers around Port Elizabeth.

=== Industrial ===
For some reason, few Class 12Rs ended up in industrial service despite their evident suitability for such work. Of the ex Class 12B locomotives, only no. 1936 was sold to Enyati Colliery and later became Western Holdings Gold Mine's no. 8.

== Works numbers ==
The Baldwin works numbers did not run consecutively for the whole order and are shown in the table.

Class 12B 4-8-2 Works numbers
SAR no.	Works no.
1931	52476
1932	52558
1933	52559
1934	52583
1935	52584
1936	52649
1937	52650
1938	52651
1939	52690
1940	52691
1941	52692
1942	52693
1943	52712
1944	52713
1945	52723
1946	52724
1947	52754
1948	52755
1949	52756
1950	52757
1951	52758
1952	52759
1953	52760
1954	52761
1955	52762
1956	52763
1957	52764
1958	52765
1959	52766
1960	52767

== Preservation ==
Class	Number	Works nmr	THF / Private	Leaselend / Owner	Current Location	Outside South Africa	?
12R	1865	BP 5994	Private		Kimberley Locomotive Depot		
12R	1947	BALDWIN 52754	THF	Reefsteamers	Germiston Locomotive Depot		
12R	1505	NBL 20176	THF	Umgeni Steam Railway	Kloofstation (Inchaga)		
12A	2111	NBL 22751	THF		Bloemfontein Locomotive Depot		
12AR	1535	NBL 21753	THF	Reefsteamers	Germiston Locomotive Depot		

== Illustration ==
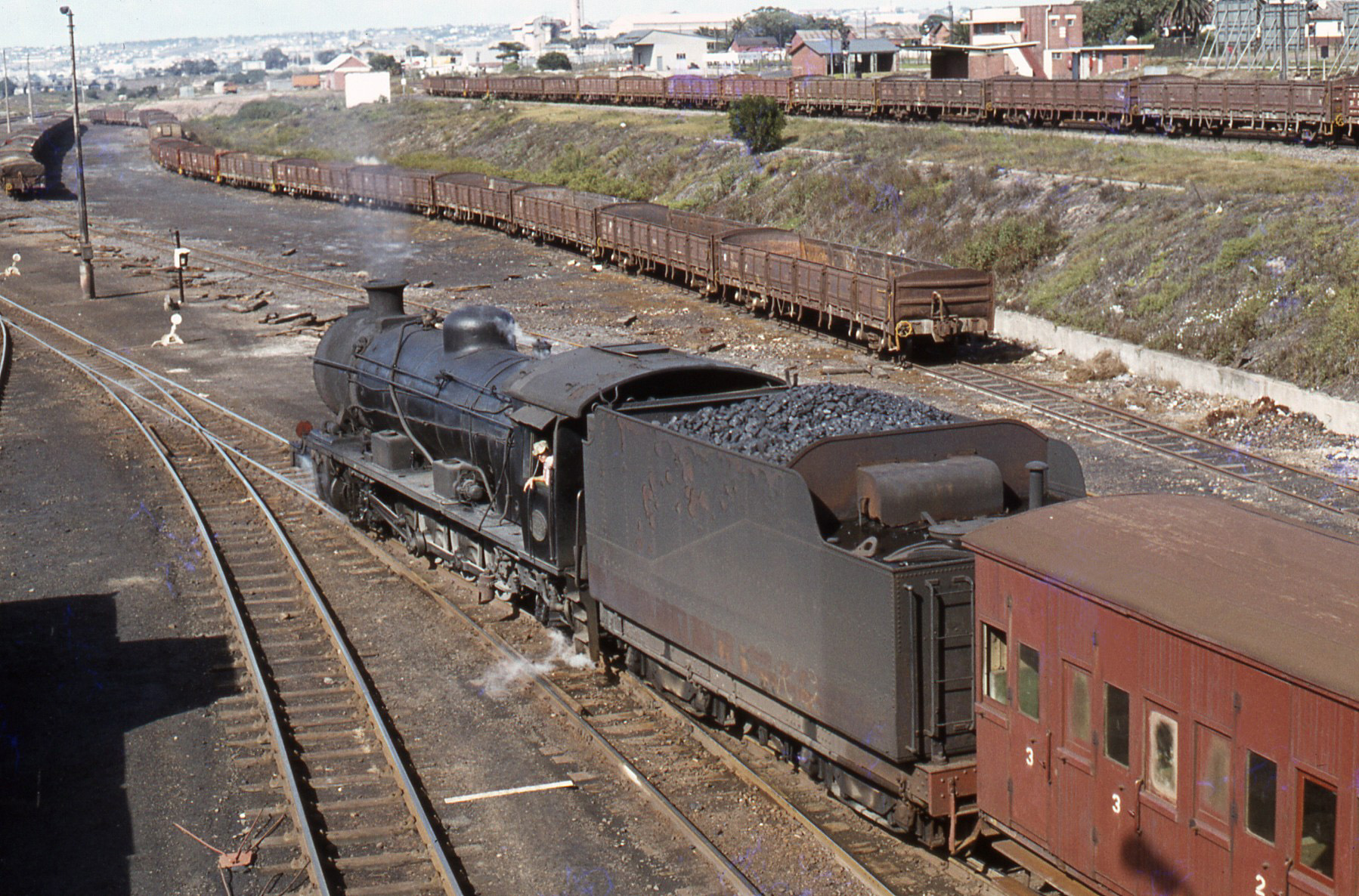
Class 12R no. 1939 on the shunt at New Brighton, 31 March 1979
