= South African type MY tender =

Steam locomotive tender in South Africa

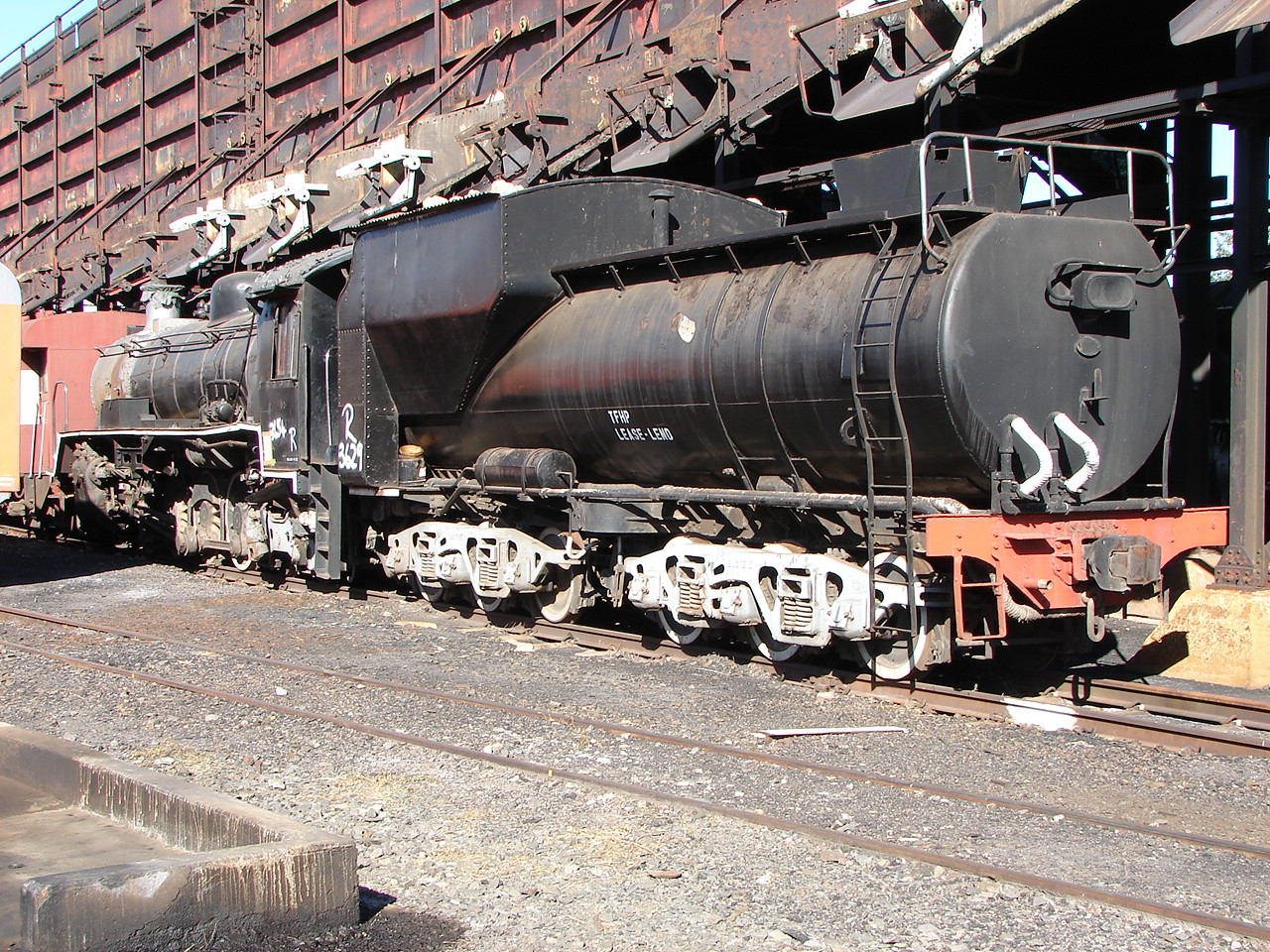
- Type MY tender on Class 24, 2009
Type and origin
- Locomotive: Class 24
- Designer: South African Railways (Dr. M.M. Loubser)
- Builder: North British Locomotive Company
- In service: 1949
Specifications
- Configuration: 3-axle bogies
- Gauge: 3 ft 6 in (1,067 mm) Cape gauge
- Length: 34 ft 3 1/4 in (10,446 mm)
- Bogies: Buckeye
- Wheel dia.: 34 in (864 mm)
- Wheelbase: 24 ft 7 1/4 in (7,499 mm)
  - Bogie: 8 ft 8 in (2,642 mm)
- Axle load: 9 LT 10 cwt (9,652 kg)
  - Front bogie: 28 LT 1 cwt (28,500 kg)
  - Rear bogie: 28 LT 10 cwt (28,960 kg)
- Weight empty: 61,500 lb (27,900 kg)
- Weight w/o: 56 LT 11 cwt (57,460 kg)
- Fuel type: Coal
- Fuel cap.: 9 LT (9.1 t)
- Water cap.: 4,520 imp gal (20,550 L)
- Stoking: Manual
- Couplers: Drawbar & AAR knuckle
Career
- Operators: South African Railways
- Numbers: SAR 3601-3700
- Nicknames: Torpedo

The South African type MY tender was a steam locomotive tender.

Type MY tenders entered service in 1949 and 1950, as tenders to the Class 24 2-8-4 Berkshire type branchline steam locomotives which entered service on the South African Railways in that year.

== Manufacturer ==
Type MY tenders were built in 1949 by the North British Locomotive Company.

The Class 24 2-8-4 Berkshire type steam locomotive was designed by Dr. M.M. Loubser, Chief Mechanical Engineer of the South African Railways (SAR) from 1939 to 1949, to replace the old Classes 6, 7 and 8 locomotives in branchline service on light rail in South Africa and especially in South West Africa. The Type MY entered service as tenders to these locomotives.

== Characteristics ==
The tender had a coal capacity of 9 long tons (9.1 tonnes), a water capacity of 4,520 imperial gallons (20,500 litres) and a maximum axle loading of 9 long tons 10 hundredweight (9,652 kilograms).

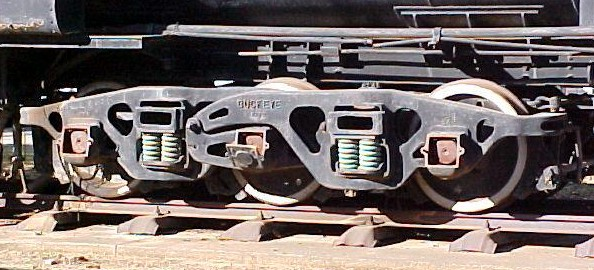
Buckeye bogie

It was a tank wagon type tender, similar in appearance to the North American Vanderbilt type tender, with a cylindrical water tank which had an inside diameter of 6 feet 5 3/4 inches (1,975 millimetres). The tender was similar to the Type MX tender, but its wheelbase was 10 feet 1 3/4 inches (3,092 millimetres) shorter. Like the Type MX tender, it rode on three-axle Buckeye bogies, supplied by General Steel Castings of Eddystone, Pennsylvania, and became commonly known as a Torpedo tender. Like its engine, the tender was equipped with vacuum brakes.

== Locomotive ==
Only the Class 24 locomotives were delivered new with Type MY tenders, which were numbered in the range from 3601 to 3700 for their engines. An oval number plate, bearing the engine number and often also the tender type, was attached to the rear end of the tenders.

== Classification letters ==
Since many tender types are interchangeable between different locomotive classes and types, a tender classification system was adopted by the SAR. The first letter of the tender type indicates the classes of engines to which it could be coupled. The "M_" tenders could be used with the locomotive classes as shown, although in some cases, engine drawbars and intermediate emergency chains had to be replaced or adjusted to suit the target locomotive.

- Class 12, Class 12A and Class 12B.
- Class 14, Class 14A and Class 14B.
- Class 15 and Class 15A.
- Class 16, Class 16A, Class 16B and Class 16C.
- Class 19, Class 19A, Class 19B, Class 19C and Class 19D.
- Class 20.
- Class 24.
- Class MC1, Class MH and Class MJ.
- Class S2.

The second letter indicates the tender's water capacity. The "_Y" tenders had a capacity of between 4,500 and 4,520 imperial gallons (20,460 and 20,550 litres; 5,404 and 5,428 US gallons).

A number, when added after the letter code, indicates differences between similar tender types, such as function, wheelbase or coal bunker capacity.

== Illustration ==
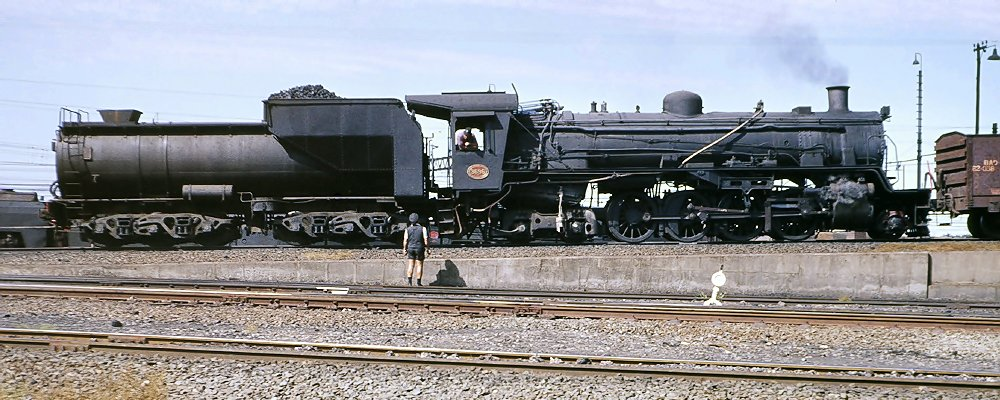
Type MY tender on Class 24, 1983

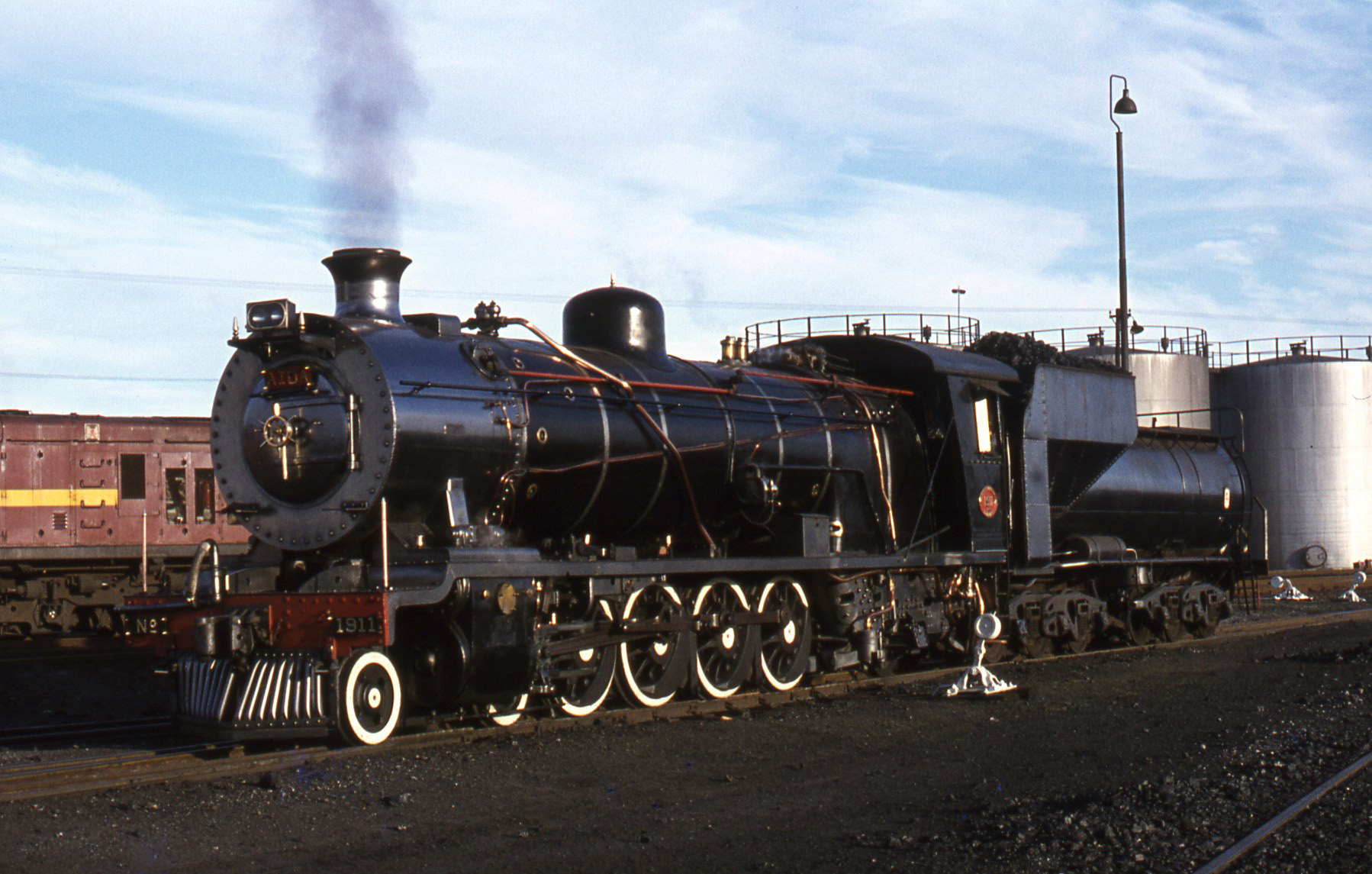
Type MY tender on Class 14A, 1978
