= South African Class 16 4-6-2 =

1914 design of steam locomotive

South African Classes 16 & 16R 4-6-2
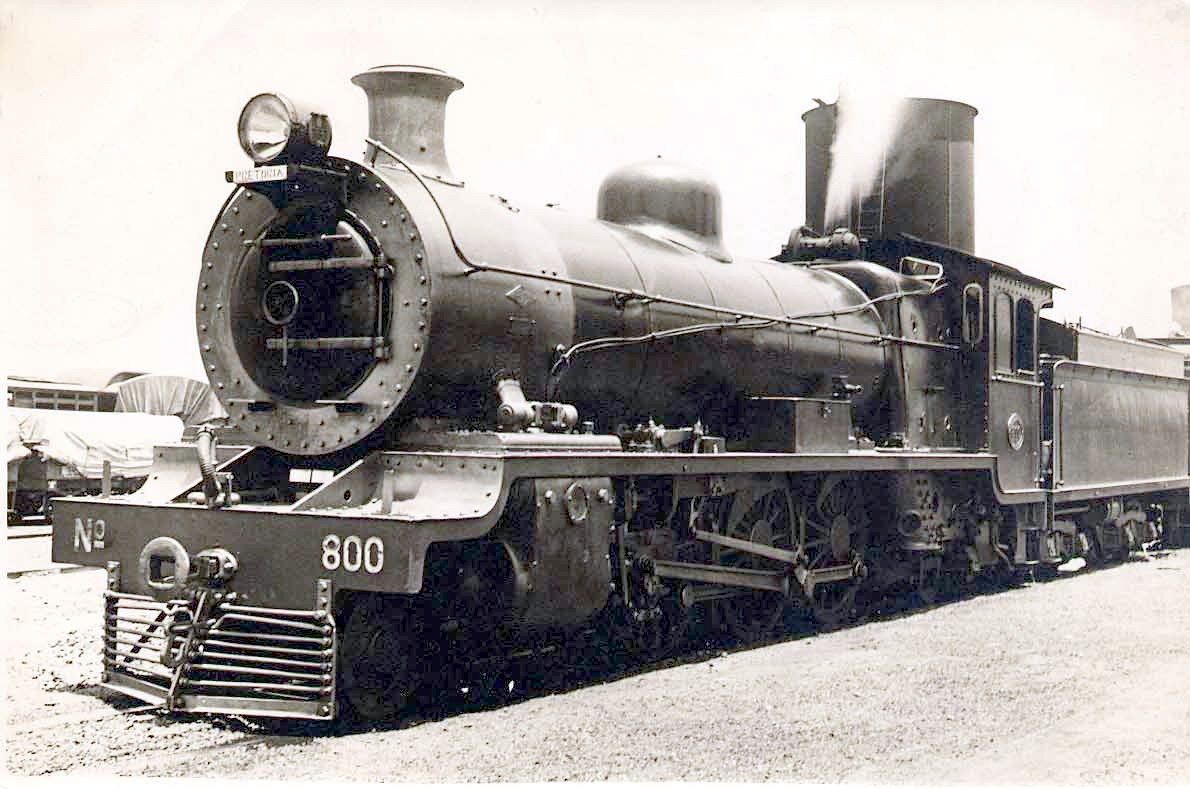
- Class 16 no. 800, Braamfontein, c. 1930
Type and origin
- ♠ Class 16 as built with a Belpaire firebox ♥ Class 16R rebuilt with a Watson Standard boiler ♣ Steel firebox – ♦ Copper firebox
- Power type: Steam
- Designer: South African Railways (D.A. Hendrie)
- Builder: North British Locomotive Company
- Serial number: 20430-20441
- Model: Class 16
- Build date: 1914
- Total produced: 12
Specifications
- Configuration
  - Whyte: 4-6-2 (Pacific)
  - UIC: 2'C1'h2
- Driver: 2nd coupled axle
- Gauge: 3 ft 6 in (1,067 mm) Cape gauge
- Leading dia.: 30 in (762 mm)
- Coupled dia.: 60 in (1,524 mm)
- Trailing dia.: 33 in (838 mm)
- Tender wheels: 34 in (864 mm)
- Wheelbase: 55 ft 11 3/4 in (17,062 mm)
  - Engine: 29 ft 5 1/2 in (8,979 mm)
  - Leading: 6 ft 2 in (1,880 mm)
  - Coupled: 10 ft 9 in (3,277 mm)
  - Tender: 16 ft 9 in (5,105 mm)
  - Tender bogie: 4 ft 7 in (1,397 mm)
- Length
  - Over couplers: 64 ft 4 1/8 in (19,612 mm)
- Height: ♠ 12 ft 10 in (3,912 mm) ♥ 12 ft 11 1/4 in (3,943 mm)
- Frame type: Plate
- Axle load: ♠ 18 LT (18,290 kg) ♥♣ 17 LT 15 cwt (18,030 kg)
  - Leading: ♠ 16 LT 3 cwt (16,410 kg) ♥♣ 16 LT 10 cwt (16,760 kg)
  - 1st coupled: ♠ 18 LT (18,290 kg) ♥♣ 17 LT 13 cwt (17,930 kg)
  - 2nd coupled: ♠ 18 LT (18,290 kg) ♥♣ 17 LT 15 cwt (18,030 kg)
  - 3rd coupled: ♠ 17 LT 18 cwt (18,190 kg) ♥♣ 17 LT 15 cwt (18,030 kg)
  - Trailing: ♠ 13 LT 12 cwt (13,820 kg) ♥♣ 13 LT 8 cwt (13,620 kg)
  - Tender bogie: Bogie 1: 27 LT 10 cwt (27,940 kg); Bogie 2: 23 LT 11 cwt (23,930 kg)
  - Tender axle: 13 LT 15 cwt (13,970 kg)
- Adhesive weight: ♠ 53 LT 18 cwt (54,760 kg) ♥♣ 53 LT 3 cwt (54,000 kg)
- Loco weight: ♠ 83 LT 13 cwt (84,990 kg) ♥♣ 82 LT 19 cwt (84,280 kg)
- Tender weight: 51 LT 1 cwt (51,870 kg)
- Total weight: ♠ 134 LT 14 cwt (136,900 kg) ♥♣ 134 LT (136,200 kg)
- Tender type: MP1 (2-axle bogies); MP, MP1, MR, MS, MT, MT1, MT2, MX, MY, MY1 permitted
- Fuel type: Coal
- Fuel capacity: 10 LT (10.2 t)
- Water cap.: 4,250 imp gal (19,300 L)
- Firebox
  - Type: ♠ Belpaire – ♥ Round-top
  - Grate area: ♠♥ 37 sq ft (3.4 m^{2})
- Boiler
  - Model: Watson Standard no. 2B
  - Pitch: ♠ 7 ft 9 in (2,362 mm) ♥ 8 ft (2,438 mm)
  - Diameter: ♠ 5 ft 4 5/8 in (1,641 mm) ♥ 5 ft 7 1/2 in (1,714 mm)
  - Tube plates: ♠ 18 ft 3 in (5,563 mm) ♥♣ 18 ft 4 in (5,588 mm) ♥♦ 18 ft 3 5/8 in (5,578 mm)
  - Small tubes: ♠ 131: 2 1/4 in (57 mm) ♥ 87: 2 1/2 in (64 mm)
  - Large tubes: ♠ 24: 5 1/2 in (140 mm) ♥ 30: 5 1/2 in (140 mm)
- Boiler pressure: ♠♥ 190 psi (1,310 kPa)
- Safety valve: ♠ Ramsbottom ♥ Pop
- Heating surface
  - Firebox: ♠ 146 sq ft (13.6 m^{2}) ♥ 142 sq ft (13.2 m^{2})
  - Tubes: ♠ 2,040 sq ft (190 m^{2}) ♥ 1,836 sq ft (170.6 m^{2})
  - Total surface: ♠ 2,186 sq ft (203.1 m^{2}) ♥ 1,978 sq ft (183.8 m^{2})
- Superheater
  - Heating area: ♠ 515 sq ft (47.8 m^{2}) ♥ 472 sq ft (43.9 m^{2})
- Cylinders: Two
- Cylinder size: 22 in (559 mm) bore 26 in (660 mm) stroke
- Valve gear: Walschaerts
- Valve type: Piston
- Couplers: Johnston link-and-pin AAR knuckle (1930s)
Performance figures
- Tractive effort: ♠♥ 29,890 lbf (133.0 kN) @ 75%
Career
- Operators: South African Railways
- Class: Class 16 & 16R
- Number in class: 12
- Numbers: 790–801
- Delivered: 1914
- First run: 1914
- The 2nd coupled axle had flangeless wheels

The South African Railways Class 16 4-6-2 of 1914 was a steam locomotive.

In 1914, the South African Railways placed twelve Class 16 steam locomotives with a 4-6-2 Pacific type wheel arrangement in passenger train service.

== Manufacturer ==
The Class 16 4-6-2 Pacific type passenger locomotive was designed by D.A. Hendrie, Chief Mechanical Engineer (CME) of the South African Railways (SAR) from 1910 to 1922. It was built by the North British Locomotive Company in Glasgow, Scotland, who delivered twelve locomotives in 1914, numbered in the range from 790 to 801.

== Characteristics ==
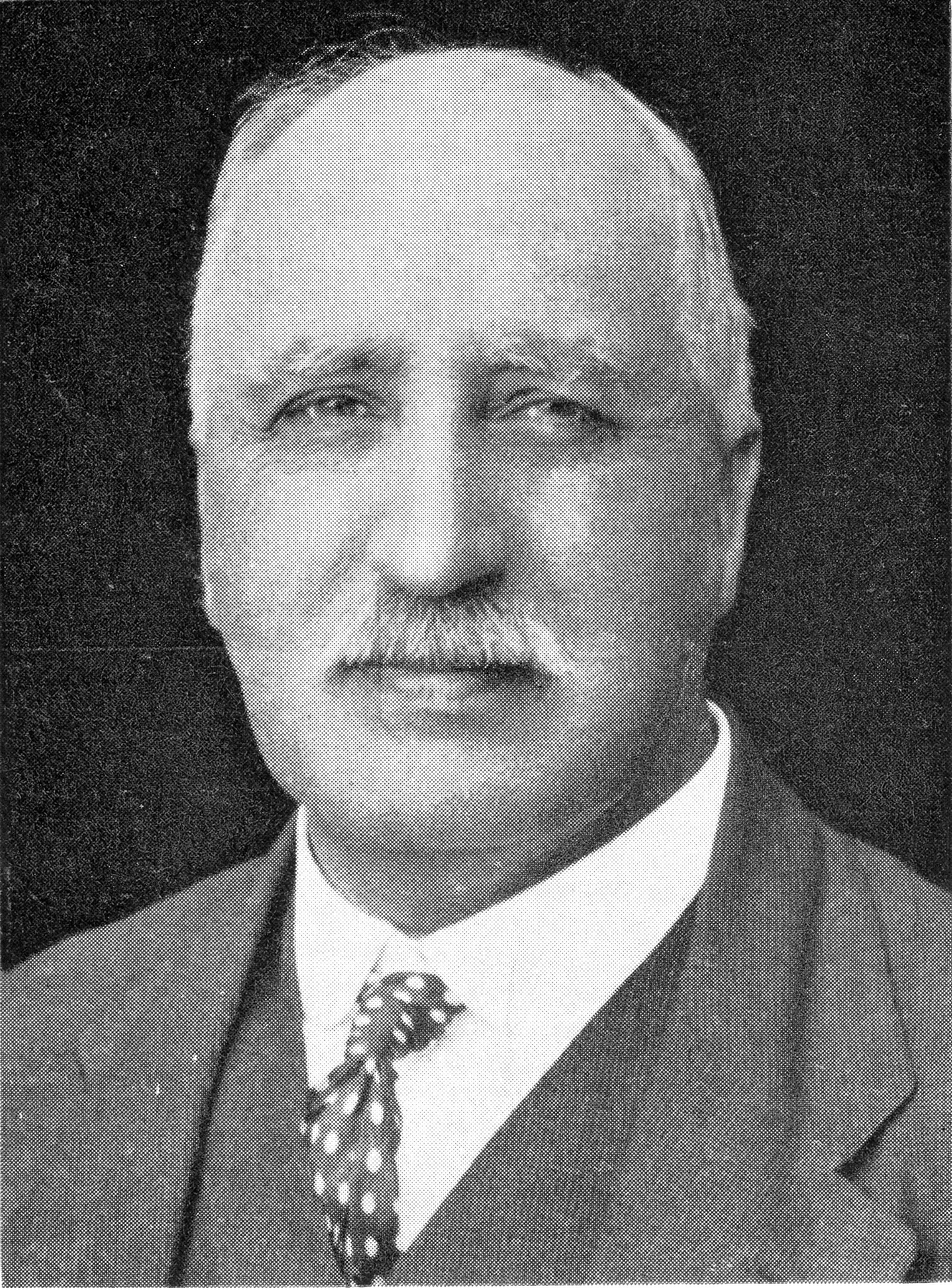
D.A. Hendrie

The design of the Class 16 closely followed that of Hendrie's Class 15 4-8-2 Mountain type which was introduced at the same time from the same builders and many parts were made interchangeable.

The cylinders were arranged outside the plate frames, with the piston valves above the cylinders and actuated by Walschaerts valve gear. The boilers were equipped with superheaters and had Belpaire fireboxes. The engines were delivered new with Type MP1 tenders with a 10 long tons (10.2 tonnes) coal capacity and a 4,250 imperial gallons (19,300 litres) water capacity.

== Power comparison ==
When it was built in 1914, the Class 16 was considered to be a very large and powerful express locomotive, even when compared to British locomotives which were built to run on 4 feet 8 1/2 inches (1,435 millimetres) broad gauge. As built, with 60 inches (1,524 millimetres) diameter coupled wheels, the ratio of wheel diameter to rail gauge was the same as that of a broad gauge locomotive with 81 inches (2,057 millimetres) diameter coupled wheels. Their tractive effort of 29,890 pounds-force (133.0 kilonewtons) at 75% boiler pressure exceeded the 27,800 pounds-force (124 kilonewtons) at 85% boiler pressure of Churchward's The Great Bear Pacific on the Great Western Railway and equalled, also at 85% boiler pressure, that of Gresley's later Great Northern Pacifics. This made the Class 16 the most powerful express passenger locomotive design yet to have been built in Great Britain at the time.

== Watson Standard boilers ==
During the 1930s, many serving locomotives were reboilered with a standard boiler type designed by A.G. Watson, CME of the SAR from 1929 to 1936, as part of his standardisation policy. Such Watson Standard reboilered locomotives were reclassified by adding an "R" suffix to their classification.

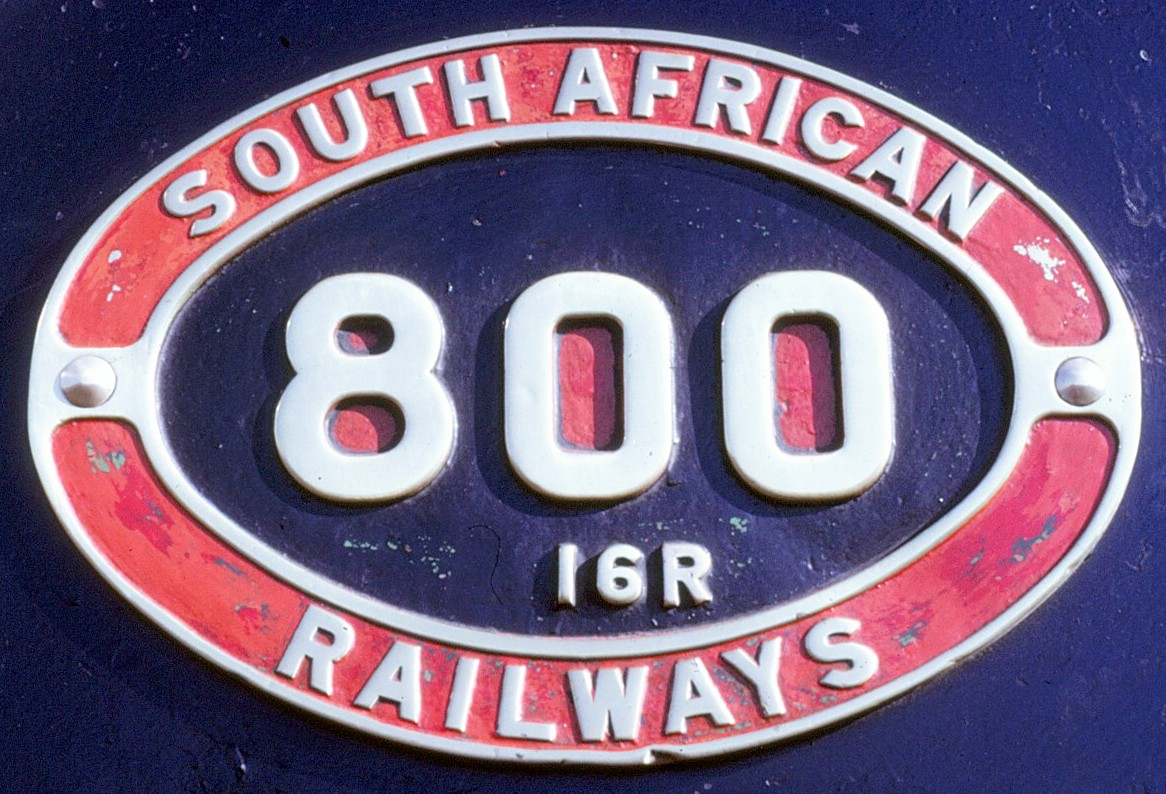

Eventually all twelve Class 16 locomotives were reboilered with Watson Standard no. 2B boilers and reclassified to Class 16R. Early conversions were equipped with copper and later conversions with steel fireboxes. In the process, they were also equipped with Watson cabs with their distinctive slanted fronts, compared to the conventional vertical fronts of their original cabs.

Their original Belpaire boilers were fitted with Ramsbottom safety valves, while the Watson Standard boiler was fitted with Pop safety valves. An obvious visual difference between an original and a Watson Standard reboilered locomotive is usually a rectangular regulator cover, just to the rear of the chimney on the reboilered locomotive. In the case of the Class 16 and Class 16R locomotives, two even more obvious differences are the Watson cab and the absence of the Belpaire firebox hump between the cab and boiler on the reboilered locomotives.

== Service ==
The Class 16 was intended for fast passenger trains in Transvaal, the Orange Free State and the upper sections of Natal where the gradients were not as severe. They were placed in suburban passenger service, working between Pretoria and Johannesburg, and in mainline service on the section from Johannesburg to Volksrust on the line to Natal. In later years, after being withdrawn from mainline passenger service, many of these locomotives remained employed in suburban passenger working and shunting service.

== Preservation ==
Number	Works nmr	THF / Private	Leaselend / Owner	Current Location	Outside South Africa	?
794		THF		Krugersdorp Locomotive Depot		

== Illustration ==
The main picture shows Class 16 no. 800 at Braamfontein c. 1930, as built with a Belpaire firebox and Type MP1 tender, on interurban service with a destination board for Pretoria below its headlight.

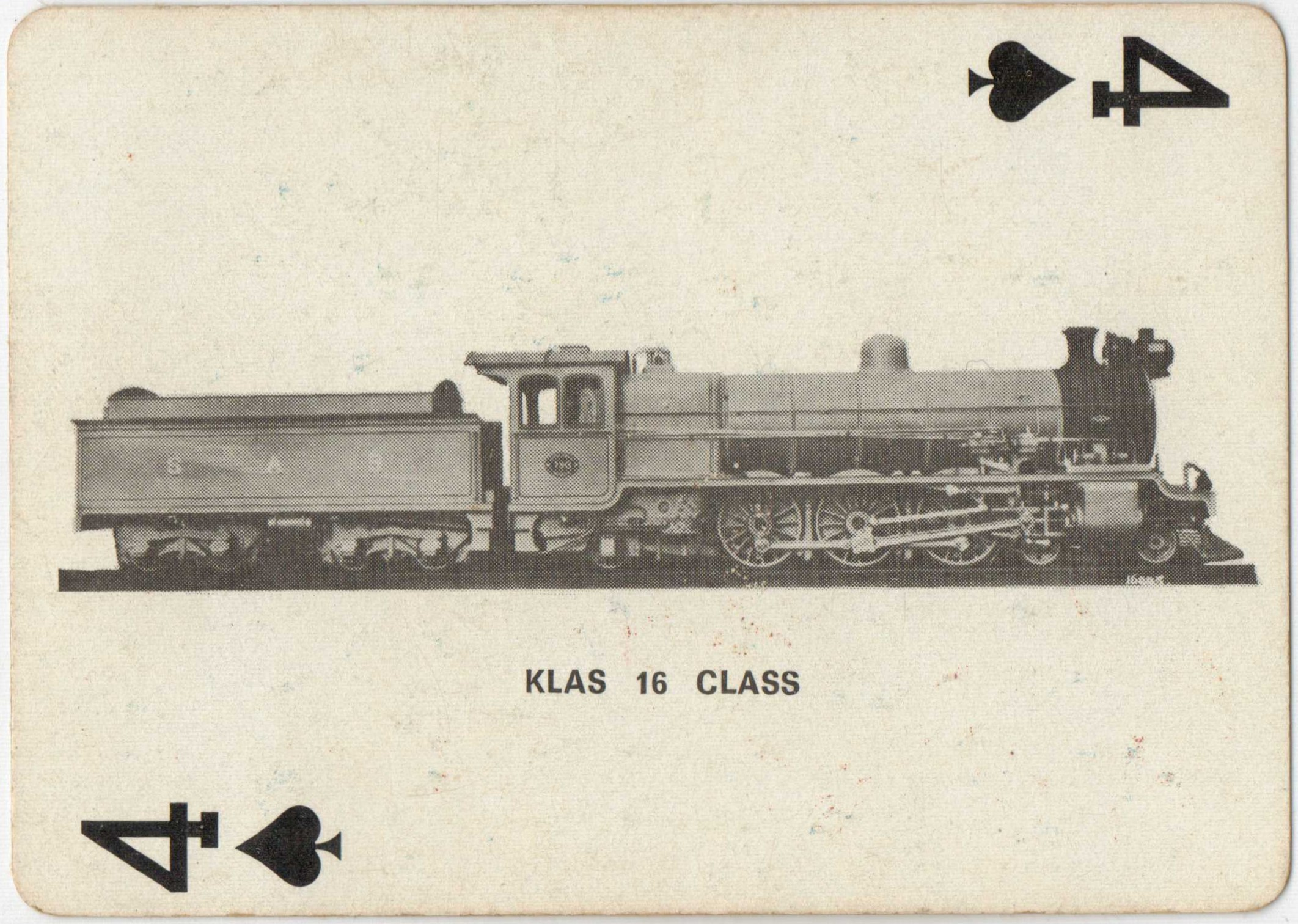
Class 16 no. 790, as built, on a SAR Museum playing card

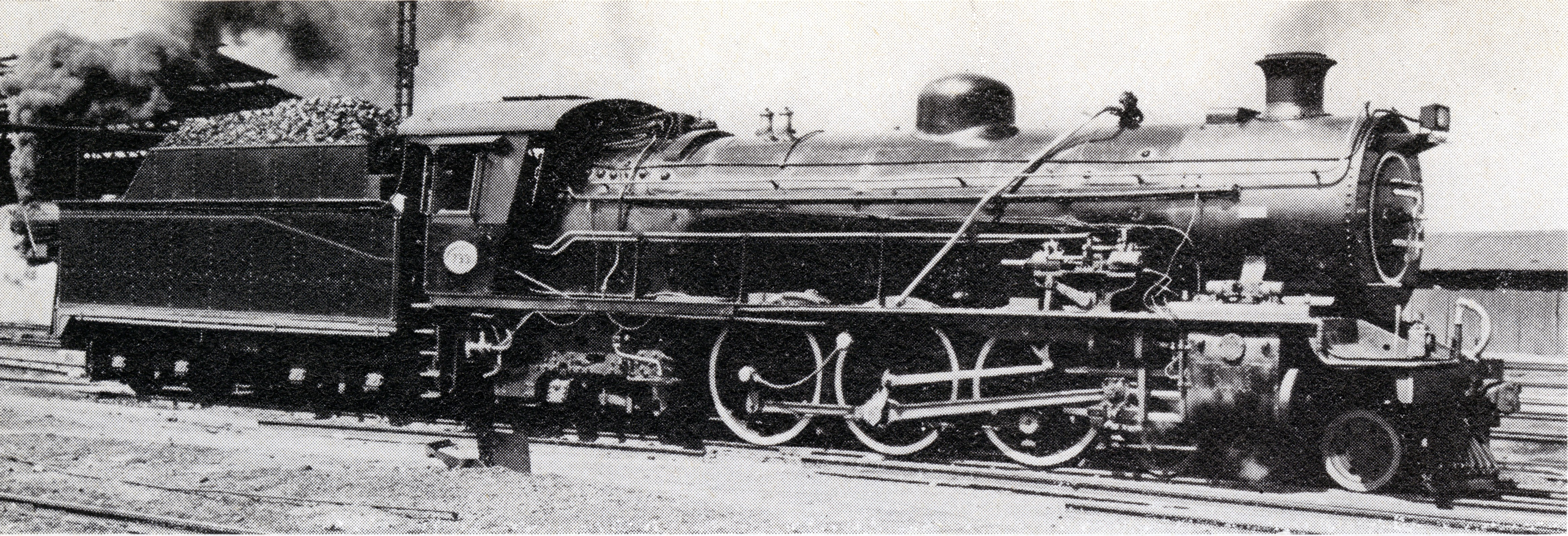
Class 16R no. 793 with a modified Type MP1 tender
