= South African Class 14B 4-8-2 =

1915 design of steam locomotive

South African Class 14B, 14 & 14R 4-8-2
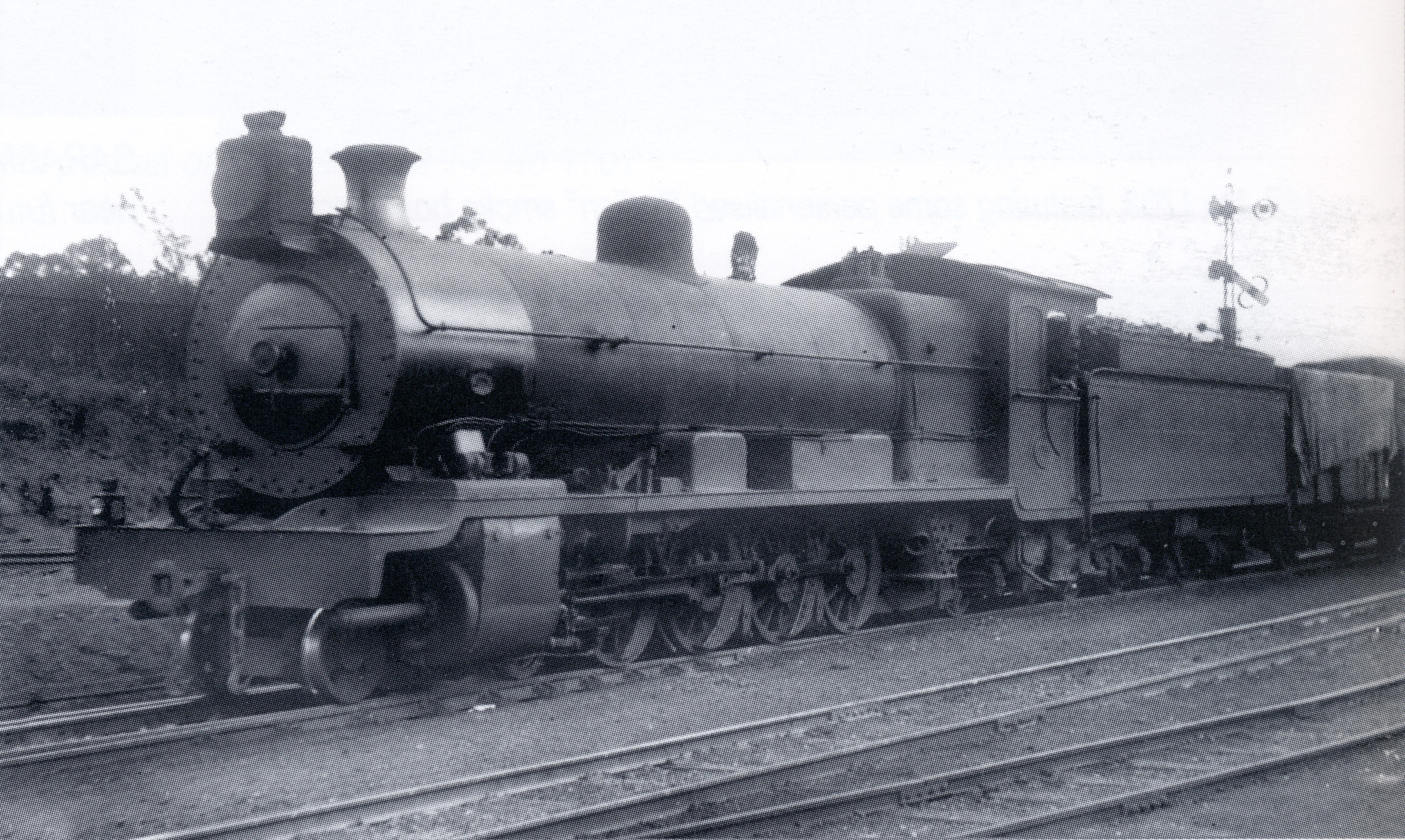
- Class 14B, as built, c. 1921
Type and origin
- ʘ Class 14B, saturated steam ♠ Class 14, superheated steam ♥ Class 14R rebuilt with a Watson Standard boiler ♣ Steel firebox - ♦ Copper firebox
- Power type: Steam
- Designer: South African Railways
- Builder: Beyer, Peacock & Company
- Order number: 0788
- Serial number: 5877-5891
- Model: Class 14B
- Build date: 1914-1915
- Total produced: 15
Specifications
- Configuration
  - Whyte: 4-8-2 (Mountain)
  - UIC: ʘ 2'D1'n2 - ♠♥ 2'D1'h2
- Driver: 2nd coupled axle
- Gauge: 3 ft 6 in (1,067 mm) Cape gauge
- Leading dia.: 28 1/2 in (724 mm)
- Coupled dia.: 48 in (1,219 mm)
- Trailing dia.: 33 in (838 mm)
- Tender wheels: 34 in (864 mm)
- Wheelbase: 56 ft 11 3/8 in (17,358 mm)
  - Engine: 30 ft 7 in (9,322 mm)
  - Leading: 6 ft 2 in (1,880 mm)
  - Coupled: 12 ft 9 in (3,886 mm)
  - Tender: 16 ft 9 in (5,105 mm)
  - Tender bogie: 4 ft 7 in (1,397 mm)
- Length
  - Over couplers: 65 ft 3 1/2 in (19,901 mm)
- Height: ʘ♠ 12 ft 7 1/2 in (3,848 mm) ♥ 12 ft 11 3/4 in (3,956 mm)
- Frame type: Plate
- Axle load: ʘ♠ 16 LT 3 cwt (16,410 kg) ♥♦ 16 LT 10 cwt (16,760 kg)
  - Leading: ʘ♠ 15 LT 14 cwt (15,950 kg) ♥♦ 15 LT 6 cwt (15,550 kg)
  - 1st coupled: ʘ♠ 16 LT 1 cwt (16,310 kg) ♥♦ 15 LT 17 cwt (16,100 kg)
  - 2nd coupled: ʘ♠ 16 LT 3 cwt (16,410 kg) ♥♦ 16 LT 10 cwt (16,760 kg)
  - 3rd coupled: ʘ♠ 16 LT 3 cwt (16,410 kg) ♥♦ 15 LT 15 cwt (16,000 kg)
  - 4th coupled: ʘ♠ 16 LT 1 cwt (16,310 kg) ♥♦ 15 LT 11 cwt (15,800 kg)
  - Trailing: ʘ♠ 10 LT 14 cwt (10,870 kg) ♥♦ 11 LT 10 cwt (11,680 kg)
  - Tender bogie: Bogie 1: 27 LT 10 cwt (27,940 kg); Bogie 2: 23 LT 11 cwt (23,930 kg)
  - Tender axle: 13 LT 15 cwt (13,970 kg)
- Adhesive weight: ʘ♠ 64 LT 8 cwt (65,430 kg) ♥♦ 63 LT 13 cwt (64,670 kg)
- Loco weight: ʘ♠ 90 LT 16 cwt (92,260 kg) ♥♦ 90 LT 4 cwt (91,650 kg)
- Tender weight: 51 LT 1 cwt (51,870 kg)
- Total weight: ʘ♠ 141 LT 17 cwt (144,100 kg) ♥♦ 141 LT 5 cwt (143,500 kg)
- Tender type: MP1 (2-axle bogies); MP, MP1, MR, MS, MT, MT1, MT2, MX, MY, MY1 permitted
- Fuel type: Coal
- Fuel capacity: 10 LT (10.2 t)
- Water cap.: 4,250 imp gal (19,300 L)
- Generator: Pyle National turbo
- Firebox
  - Type: ʘ♠ Belpaire - ♥ Round-top
  - Grate area: ʘ 36 sq ft (3.3 m^{2}) ♠♥ 37 sq ft (3.4 m^{2})
- Boiler
  - Model: Watson Standard no. 2
  - Pitch: ʘ♠ 7 ft 7 in (2,311 mm) ♥ 8 ft 1/2 in (2,451 mm)
  - Diameter: ʘ♠♥ 5 ft 7 1/2 in (1,714 mm)
  - Tube plates: ʘ♠ 19 ft (5,791 mm) ♥♣ 19 ft 4 in (5,893 mm) ♥♦ 19 ft 3 5/8 in (5,883 mm)
  - Small tubes: ʘ 253: 2 1/4 in (57 mm) ♠ 139: 2 1/4 in (57 mm) ♥ 87: 2 1/2 in (64 mm)
  - Large tubes: ♠ 24: 5 1/2 in (140 mm) ♥ 30: 5 1/2 in (140 mm)
- Boiler pressure: ʘ 200 psi (1,379 kPa) ♠♥ 190 psi (1,310 kPa)
- Safety valve: ♠ Ramsbottom - ♥ Pop
- Heating surface
  - Firebox: ʘ♠ 150 sq ft (14 m^{2}) ♥ 142 sq ft (13.2 m^{2})
  - Tubes: ʘ 2,825 sq ft (262.5 m^{2}) ♠ 2,212 sq ft (205.5 m^{2}) ♥ 1,933 sq ft (179.6 m^{2})
  - Total surface: ʘ 2,975 sq ft (276.4 m^{2}) ♠ 2,362 sq ft (219.4 m^{2}) ♥ 2,075 sq ft (192.8 m^{2})
- Superheater
  - Heating area: ♠ 540 sq ft (50 m^{2}) ♥ 492 sq ft (45.7 m^{2})
- Cylinders: Two
- Cylinder size: ʘ 21 in (533 mm) bore ♠♥ 22 in (559 mm) bore ʘ♠♥ 26 in (660 mm) stroke
- Valve gear: Walschaerts
- Valve type: Piston
- Couplers: Johnston link-and-pin AAR knuckle (1930s)
Performance figures
- Tractive effort: ʘ 35,831 lbf (159.38 kN) @ 75% ♠♥ 37,360 lbf (166.2 kN) @ 75%
Career
- Operators: South African Railways
- Class: Class 14B, 14 & 14R
- Number in class: 15
- Numbers: 1746-1760
- Delivered: 1915
- First run: 1915
- Withdrawn: 1982
- Disposition: 14 scrapped, 1 preserved

The South African Railways Class 14B 4-8-2 of 1915 was a steam locomotive.

In 1915, the South African Railways placed fifteen Class 14B saturated steam locomotives with a 4-8-2 wheel arrangement in service. When they were subsequently converted to superheating, they were reclassified to Class 14. In the 1930s all but one were reboilered with Watson Standard no. 2 boilers and reclassified to Class 14R.

== Manufacturer ==
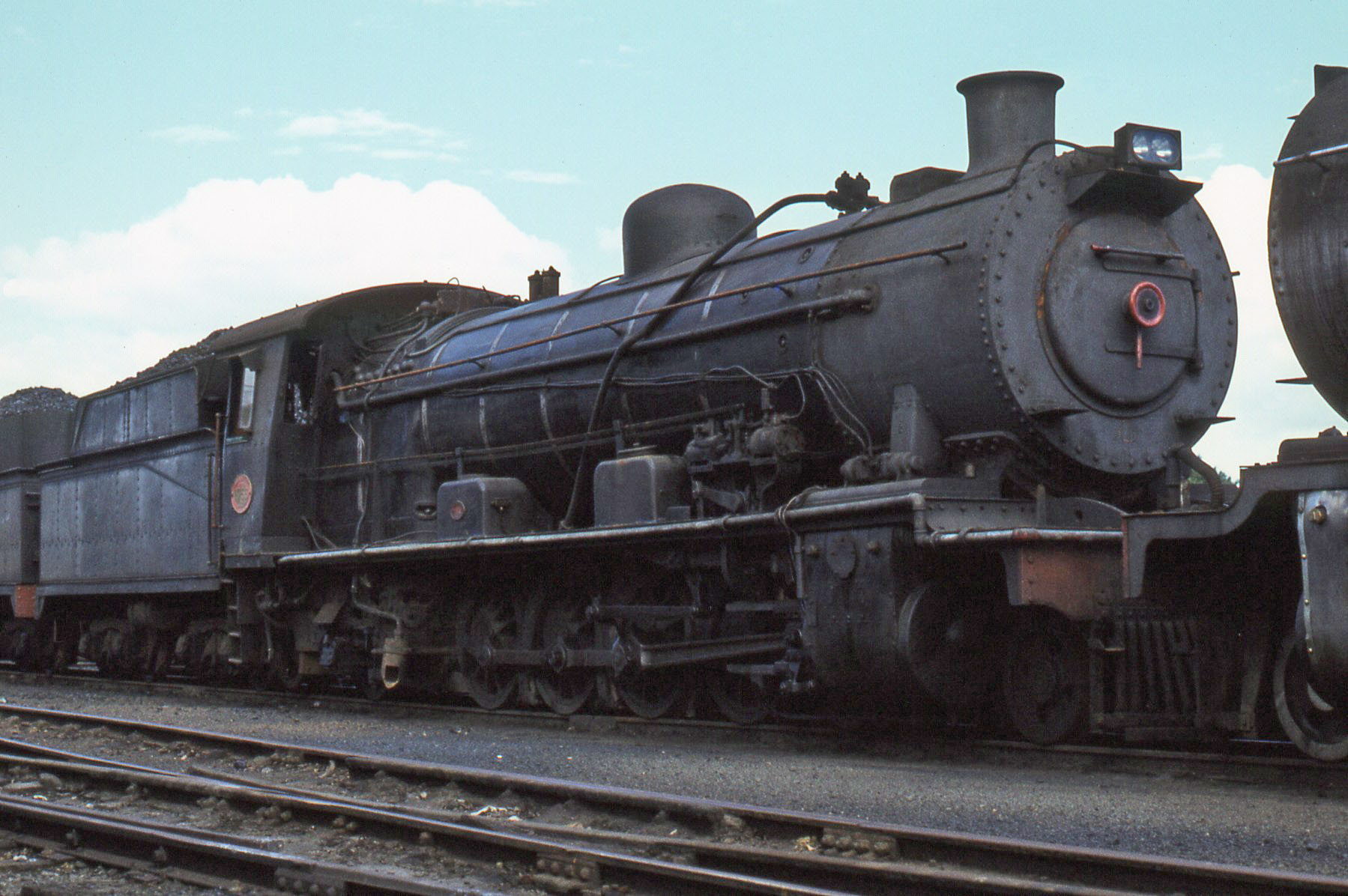
Class 14R no. 1756, 23 March 1979

The third version of the Class 14 locomotive was ordered from Beyer, Peacock & Company in 1914. Fifteen locomotives were delivered in 1915, numbered in the range from 1746 to 1760. These saturated steam versions of the Class 14 were designated Class 14B.

== Characteristics ==
Like the Class 14, the Class 14B had Walschaerts valve gear and a Belpaire firebox. Because it was intended for use on the lower section of the Natal mainline, D.A. Hendrie, Chief Mechanical Engineer (CME) of the South African Railways (SAR), concluded that no high degree of superheat would be attainable and the locomotives were therefore ordered without superheaters. They were intended for use on the Town Hill section near Pietermaritzburg, where the old line was on a 1 in 30 (3⅓%) gradient and where speeds were low with frequent stops which, it was reasoned, would not justify the use of superheating.

== Modification and reclassification ==
Once in service, the omission of superheating soon became a bone of contention. About six years after the Class 14B was commissioned, an officer of the Mechanical Department submitted a report which claimed that the loss of haulage power and increased water and coal consumption which were brought about by the absence of superheating on these engines, represented a loss to the SAR of approximately £100,000 when compared with the superheated Class 14. Given that eight years later, in 1929, the purchase price of a new Class 19A locomotive would be £6,387 (£5,323 for the engine and £1,064 for the tender), this was a staggering amount.

This report caused a flutter in the Railways Administration. The officer who made it, left the service to do very well elsewhere. Conversion of the Class 14B to superheating began soon afterwards. Between 1922 and 1925, all fifteen Class 14B locomotives were converted. Their cylinders were reamed from 21 to 22 inches (533 to 559 millimetres) bore and the boiler pressure reduced from 200 to 190 pounds per square inch (1,379 to 1,310 kilopascals). Since their being non-superheated with smaller cylinders had been the only reasons for their separate Class 14B classification, they were all reclassified to Class 14.

Of all the locomotives introduced during Hendrie's term as CME, the Class 14B was the only one to fall short of expectations. In fairness to Hendrie and his decision to omit superheating, it should be borne in mind that, at the time, automatic dampers were still in use, which cut out the superheater while the regulator was closed. This reduced much of the superheater's effectiveness on undulating track and where frequent stops are required. A report had been submitted in Natal earlier to the effect that superheating was of little or no advantage on that System, where the many short and steep gradients prevented a high degree of superheat from being attained with the automatic dampers in use at the time. In view of the added cost and weight of the superheating equipment, the arguments against it in Natal were therefore considered reasonable at the time.

== Watson Standard boilers ==
During the 1930s, many serving locomotives were reboilered with a standard boiler type designed by then CME A.G. Watson as part of his standardisation policy. Such Watson Standard reboilered locomotives were reclassified by adding an "R" suffix to their classification.

From 1935, all the ex Class 14B locomotives except no. 1750 were reboilered with Watson Standard no. 2 boilers and reclassified to Class 14R. Only slight modifications were found necessary to take the new boilers. In the process, the engines were also equipped with Watson cabs with their distinctive slanted fronts, compared to the conventional vertical fronts of the original cabs. The flangeless leading coupled wheels were flanged and Type MR tenders were attached to the reboilered engines. No. 1750 was sold to ISCOR without being reboilered.

Their original Belpaire boilers were fitted with Ramsbottom safety valves, while the Watson Standard boiler was fitted with Pop safety valves. An obvious difference between an original and a Watson Standard reboilered locomotive is usually a rectangular regulator cover, just to the rear of the chimney on the reboilered locomotive. In the case of the ex Class 14B locomotives, two even more obvious differences are the Watson cab and the absence of the Belpaire firebox hump between the cab and boiler on the reboilered locomotives.

== Service ==
=== South African Railways ===
The locomotives were initially in service on the lower sections of the Natal mainline, particularly the Town Hill section near Pietermaritzburg. After their reboilering and the electification of the Natal mainline, most were then allocated to Empangeni in the north and Port Shepstone in the south. In 1976, many were transferred to the Witwatersrand for shunting service. They were all withdrawn from service by 1983.

=== Industrial ===
Five were sold into industrial service:

- 1750 became ISCOR no. 15 and later Enyati Colliery no. 3.
- 1754 and 1759 went to Rustenburg Platinum Mines, retaining their SAR numbers.
- 1755 became St Helena Gold Mines no. 7.
- 1757 was sold to Grootvlei Proprietary Mines Limited.

== Preservation ==
No. 1459 is the sole survivor and is in storage at Bloemfontein Locomotive Depot.
