= South African type MX tender =

Steam locomotive introduced in 1949

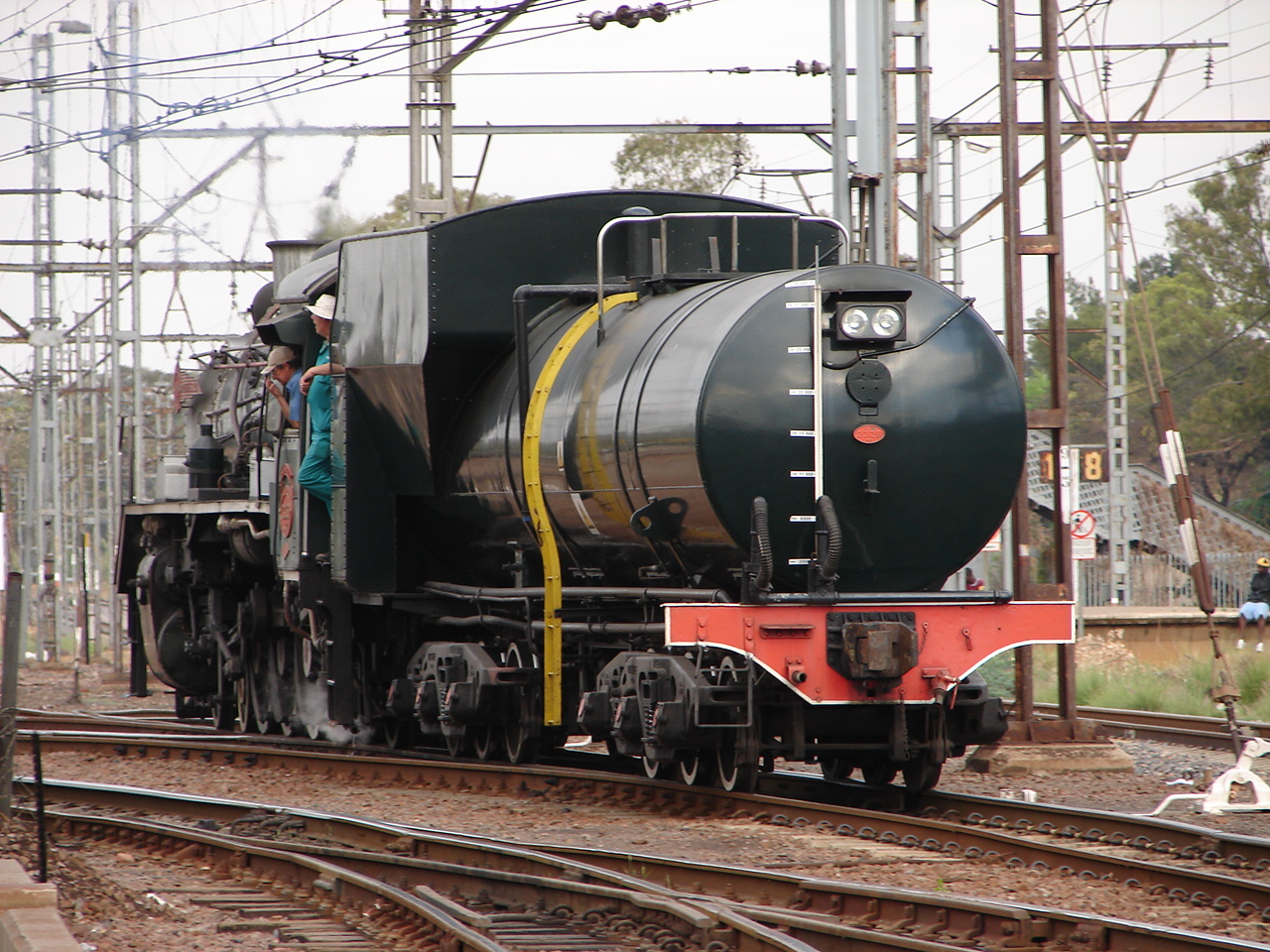
- Type MX tender on Class 19D, 2009
Type and origin
- Locomotive: Class 19D
- Designer: South African Railways (Dr. M.M. Loubser)
- Builder: North British Locomotive Company
- In service: 1949
Specifications
- Configuration: 3-axle bogies
- Gauge: 3 ft 6 in (1,067 mm) Cape gauge
- Length: 44 ft 8 3/8 in (13,624 mm)
- Bogies: Buckeye
- Wheel dia.: 34 in (864 mm)
- Wheelbase: 34 ft 9 in (10,592 mm)
  - Bogie: 8 ft 8 in (2,642 mm)
- Axle load: 12 LT 10 cwt (12,700 kg)
  - Front bogie: 37 LT 10 cwt (38,100 kg)
  - Rear bogie: 35 LT 17 cwt (36,430 kg)
- Weight empty: 72,424 lb (32,851 kg)
- Weight w/o: 73 LT 7 cwt (74,530 kg)
- Fuel type: Coal
- Fuel cap.: 12 LT (12.2 t)
- Water cap.: 6,500 imp gal (29,500 L)
- Stoking: Manual
- Couplers: Drawbar & AAR knuckle
Career
- Operators: South African Railways
- Numbers: SAR 3321-3370
- Nicknames: Torpedo

The South African type MX tender was a steam locomotive tender.

Type MX tenders entered service in 1949, as tenders to the last batch of Class 19D 4-8-2 Mountain type steam locomotives which entered service on the South African Railways in that year.

== Manufacturer ==
Type MX tenders were built in 1948 by the North British Locomotive Company.

The South African Railways (SAR) placed its final batch of fifty Class 19D locomotives in service in 1949, built by North British. The new Type MX tender for these engines was designed by Dr. M.M. Loubser, Chief Mechanical Engineer of the SAR from 1939 to 1949.

== Characteristics ==
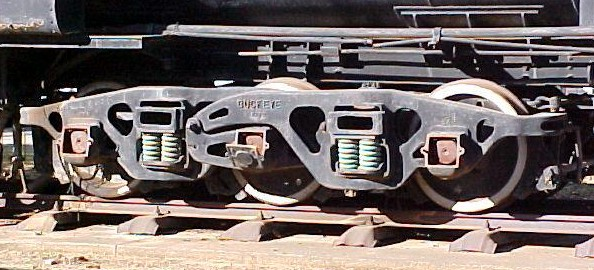
Buckeye bogie

The Type MX tender had a coal capacity of 12 long tons (12.2 tonnes), a water capacity of 6,500 imperial gallons (29,500 litres) and a maximum axle loading of 12 long tons 10 hundredweight (12,700 kilograms). It was a tank wagon type tender with a cylindrical water tank, similar in appearance to the North American Vanderbilt type tenders, and was the first of its kind on the SAR. It rode on three-axle Buckeye bogies to reduce the axle load and became commonly known as a Torpedo tender.

== Locomotive ==
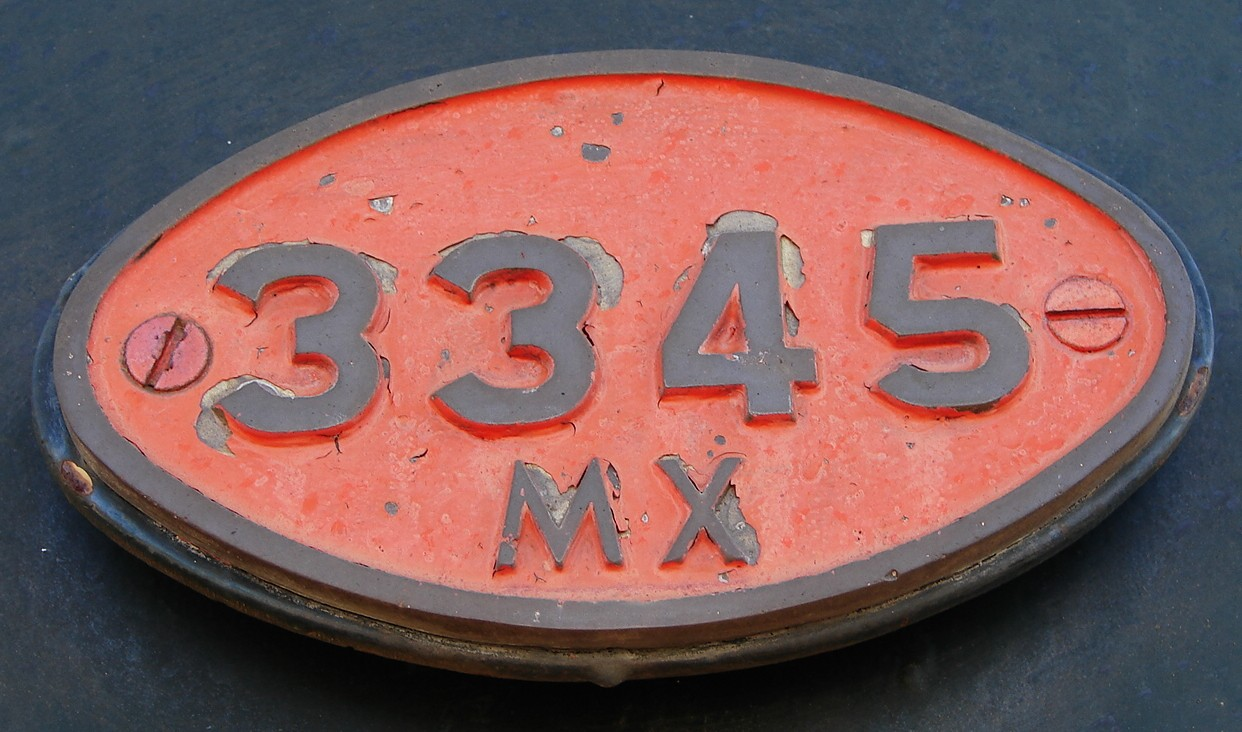

Only the last batch of fifty Class 19D locomotives were delivered new with Type MX tenders, which were numbered in the range from 3321 to 3370 for their engines. An oval number plate, bearing the engine number and tender type, was attached to the rear end of the tenders.

== Classification letters ==
Since many tender types are interchangeable between different locomotive classes and types, a tender classification system was adopted by the SAR. The first letter of the tender type indicates the classes of engines to which it could be coupled. The "M_" tenders could be used with the locomotive classes as shown, although in some cases engine drawbars and intermediate emergency chains had to be replaced or adjusted to suit the target locomotive.

- Class 12, Class 12A and Class 12B.
- Class 14, Class 14A and Class 14B.
- Class 15 and Class 15A.
- Class 16, Class 16A, Class 16B and Class 16C.
- Class 19, Class 19A, Class 19B, Class 19C and Class 19D.
- Class 20.
- Class 24.
- Class MC1, Class MH and Class MJ.
- Class S2.

The second letter indicates the tender's water capacity. The "_X" tenders had a capacity of 6,500 imperial gallons (29,500 litres; 7,810 US gallons).

== Illustration ==
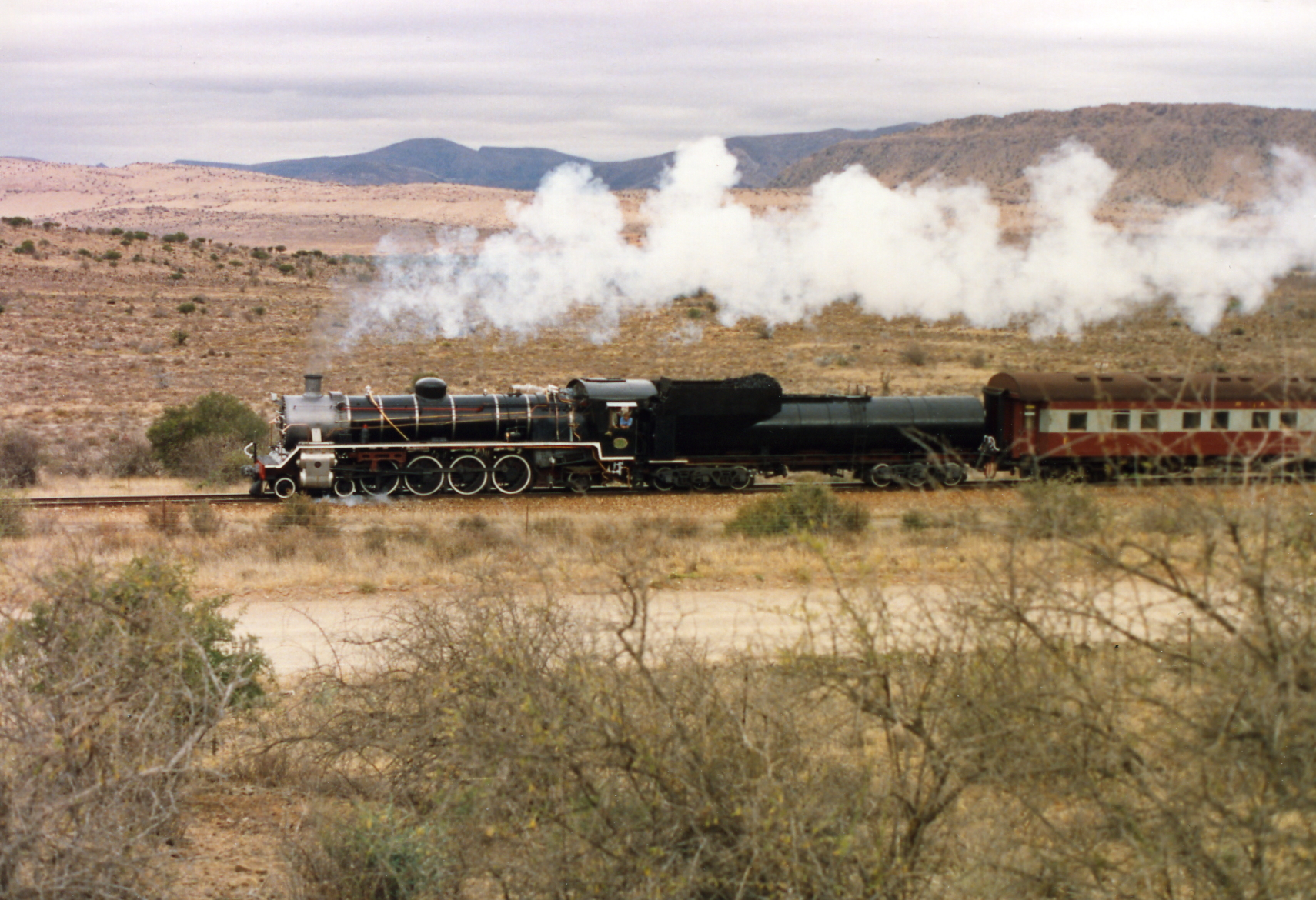
Type MX tender on Class 19C, 1989

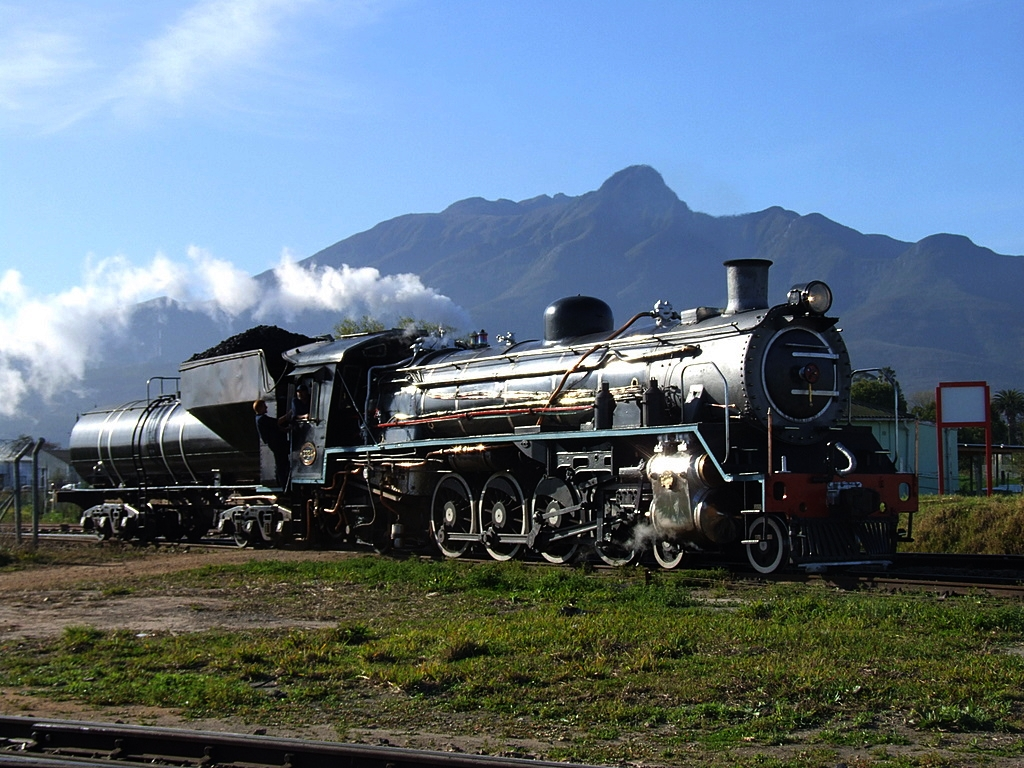
Type MX tender on Class 19D, 2008
