= 2350 class =

2350 class may refer to:

- Illinois Central 2350 Class, 4-8-2 steam locomotives
- Queensland Railways 2350 class, diesel-electric locomotives
