= South African Class 15B 4-8-2 =

1918 design of steam locomotive

South African Class 15B & 15BR 4-8-2
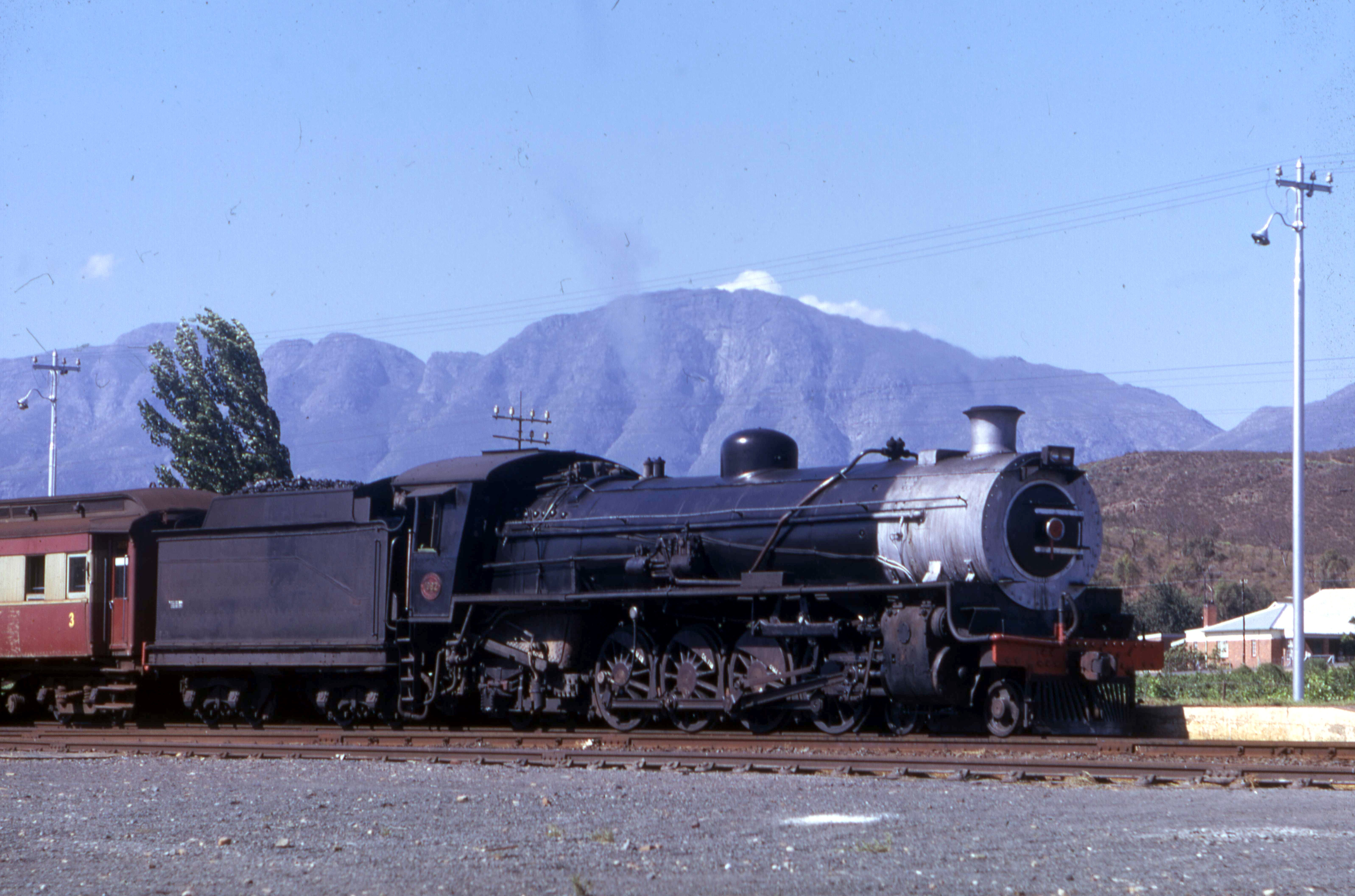
- Class 15BR no. 1982 at Bonnievale, February 1974
Type and origin
- ♠ Class 15B as built with a Belpaire firebox ♥ Class 15BR rebuilt with a Watson Standard boiler ʘ 22 in (559 mm) bore - ʘ 21 3/4 in (552 mm) bore
- Power type: Steam
- Designer: Montreal Locomotive Works
- Builder: Montreal Locomotive Works
- Serial number: 58440-58449, 61424-61443
- Model: Class 15B
- Build date: 1918-1922
- Total produced: 30
Specifications
- Configuration
  - Whyte: 4-8-2 (Mountain)
  - UIC: 2'D1'h2
- Driver: 2nd coupled axle
- Gauge: 3 ft 6 in (1,067 mm) Cape gauge
- Leading dia.: 28 1/2 in (724 mm)
- Coupled dia.: 57 in (1,448 mm)
- Trailing dia.: 33 in (838 mm)
- Tender wheels: 34 in (864 mm)
- Wheelbase: 62 ft 7 1/4 in (19,082 mm)
  - Engine: 33 ft 9 in (10,287 mm)
  - Leading: 6 ft 2 in (1,880 mm)
  - Coupled: 15 ft (4,572 mm)
  - Tender: 17 ft 11 in (5,461 mm)
  - Tender bogie: 4 ft 7 in (1,397 mm)
- Length
  - Over couplers: 70 ft 5 1/8 in (21,466 mm)
- Height: ♠ 12 ft 10 in (3,912 mm) ♥ 13 ft 3/4 in (3,981 mm)
- Frame type: Bar
- Axle load: ♠ 16 LT 11 cwt (16,820 kg) ♥ 16 LT 11 cwt (16,820 kg)
  - Leading: ♠ 16 LT 4 cwt (16,460 kg) ♥ 16 LT 6 cwt (16,560 kg)
  - 1st coupled: ♠ 16 LT 1 cwt (16,310 kg) ♥ 16 LT 11 cwt (16,820 kg)
  - 2nd coupled: ♠ 16 LT 2 cwt (16,360 kg) ♥ 15 LT 16 cwt (16,050 kg)
  - 3rd coupled: ♠ 16 LT 8 cwt (16,660 kg) ♥ 16 LT 7 cwt (16,610 kg)
  - 4th coupled: ♠ 16 LT 11 cwt (16,820 kg) ♥ 16 LT 9 cwt (16,710 kg)
  - Trailing: ♠ 10 LT 8 cwt (10,570 kg) ♥ 10 LT 6 cwt (10,470 kg)
  - Tender axle: 12 LT 14 cwt 2 qtr (12,930 kg) av.
- Adhesive weight: ♠ 65 LT 2 cwt (66,140 kg) ♥ 68 LT 3 cwt (69,240 kg)
- Loco weight: ♠ 91 LT 14 cwt (93,170 kg) ♥ 94 LT 15 cwt (96,270 kg)
- Tender weight: 50 LT 18 cwt (51,720 kg)
- Total weight: ♠ 142 LT 12 cwt (144,900 kg) ♥ 145 LT 13 cwt (148,000 kg)
- Tender type: LP (2-axle bogies)
- Fuel type: Coal
- Fuel capacity: 10 LT (10.2 t)
- Water cap.: 4,250 imp gal (19,300 L)
- Firebox
  - Type: ♠ Belpaire ♥ Round-top
  - Grate area: ♠ 40 sq ft (3.7 m^{2}) ♥ 37 sq ft (3.4 m^{2})
- Boiler
  - Model: Watson Standard no. 2A
  - Pitch: ♠ 7 ft 9 in (2,362 mm) ♥ 8 ft 1 1/2 in (2,476 mm)
  - Diameter: ♠ 5 ft 4 13/16 in (1,646 mm) ♥ 5 ft 7 1/2 in (1,714 mm)
  - Tube plates: ♠ 19 ft (5,791 mm) ♥ 21 ft 8 in (6,604 mm) steel ♥ 21 ft 7 5/8 in (6,594 mm) copper
  - Small tubes: ♠ 113: 2 1/4 in (57 mm) ♥ 87: 2 1/2 in (64 mm)
  - Large tubes: ♠ 21: 5 1/2 in (140 mm) ♥ 30: 5 1/2 in (140 mm)
- Boiler pressure: ♠♥ʘ 185 psi (1,276 kPa) ♠♥ʘ 190 psi (1,310 kPa)
- Safety valve: ♠ Ramsbottom - ♥ Pop
- Heating surface
  - Firebox: ♠ 188 sq ft (17.5 m^{2}) ♥ 143 sq ft (13.3 m^{2})
  - Tubes: ♠ 1,840 sq ft (171 m^{2}) ♥ 2,171 sq ft (201.7 m^{2})
  - Total surface: ♠ 2,028 sq ft (188.4 m^{2}) ♥ 2,313 sq ft (214.9 m^{2})
- Superheater
  - Heating area: ♠ 446 sq ft (41.4 m^{2}) ♥ 537 sq ft (49.9 m^{2})
- Cylinders: Two
- Cylinder size: ♠♥ʘ 22 in (559 mm) bore ♠♥ʘ 21 3/4 in (552 mm) bore ♠♥ 28 in (711 mm) stroke
- Valve gear: Walschaerts
- Valve type: Piston
- Couplers: Johnston link-and-pin AAR knuckle (1930s)
Performance figures
- Tractive effort: ♠♥ʘ 32,990 lbf (146.7 kN) @ 75% ♠♥ʘ 33,130 lbf (147.4 kN) @ 75%
Career
- Operators: South African Railways; Caminhos de Ferro de Moçambique; Tweefontein United Collieries; Randfontein Estates Gold Mine
- Class: Class 15B & 15BR
- Number in class: 30
- Numbers: 1829–1838, 1971-1990
- Delivered: 1918-1922
- First run: 1918
- Withdrawn: 1976
- The leading coupled axle had flangeless wheels

The South African Railways Class 15B 4-8-2 of 1918 was a steam locomotive.

Between 1918 and 1922, the South African Railways placed thirty Class 15B steam locomotives with a 4-8-2 Mountain type wheel arrangement in service.

== Manufacturer ==
The Class 15B was ordered at a time when further orders of the earlier Class 15 models were unobtainable from manufacturers in the United Kingdom as a result of wartime disruption in Europe. The first batch of ten Class 15B 4-8-2 steam locomotives for the South African Railways (SAR) was therefore ordered from the Montreal Locomotive Works (MLW) in Canada, who undertook to supply engines of equivalent power, wheelbase and weight to that of the Class 15A, but built to their own design. They were built and delivered in 1918, numbered in the range from 1829 to 1838. A second batch of twenty locomotives was ordered from the same builders and delivered in 1922, numbered in the range from 1971 to 1990.

== Characteristics ==
They were built to the general specifications of the Class 15A, but with 4 inches (102 millimetres) thick bar frames instead of plate frames and some other typical North American features, and they were equipped with Belpaire fireboxes with combustion chambers. Many of the parts of these engines were similar to those of the Class 14C which was built by the same manufacturers in that same year.

== Modifications ==
=== Cylinder bushing ===
The first ten locomotives were modified on similar lines as the earlier versions of the Class 14C. As they went in for major overhauls, they had their cylinders bushed to reduce the bore from the as-built 22 to 21 3/4 inches (559 to 552 millimetres). At the same time, their operating boiler pressure was adjusted upwards from 185 to 190 pounds per square inch (1,276 to 1,310 kilopascals) to keep their tractive effort more or less unaffected by the reduction in piston diameter.

=== Watson Standard boilers ===
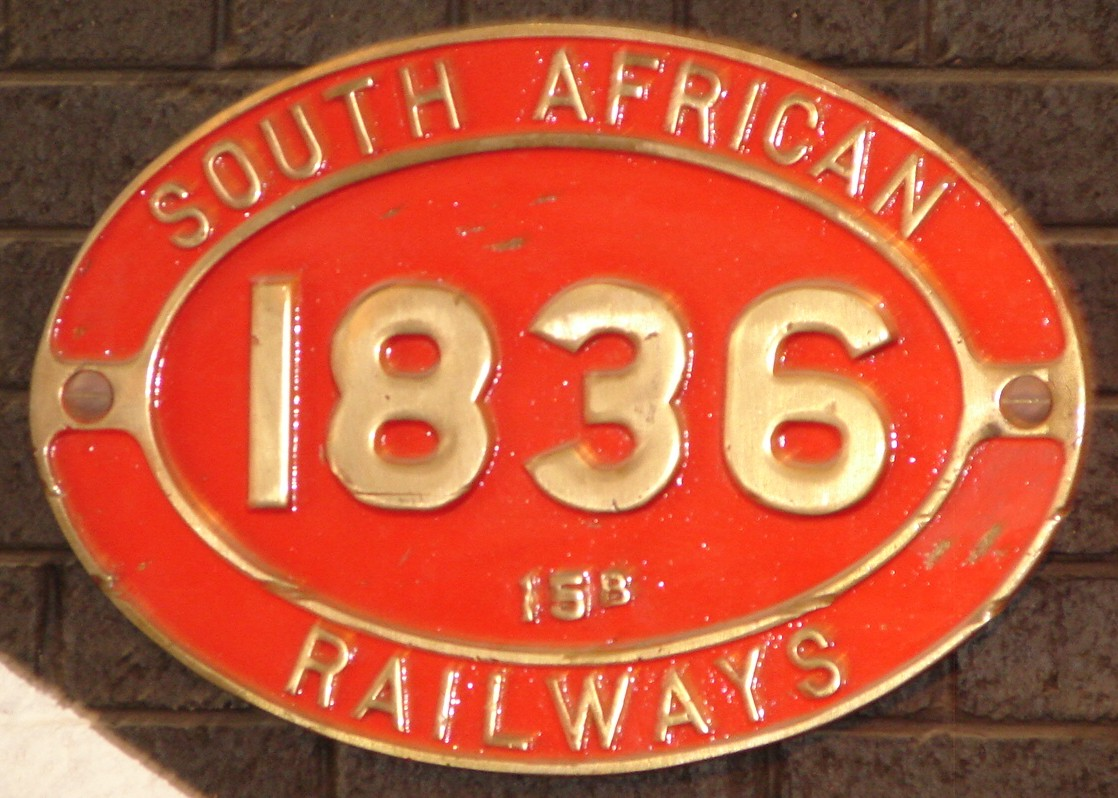
Class 15B

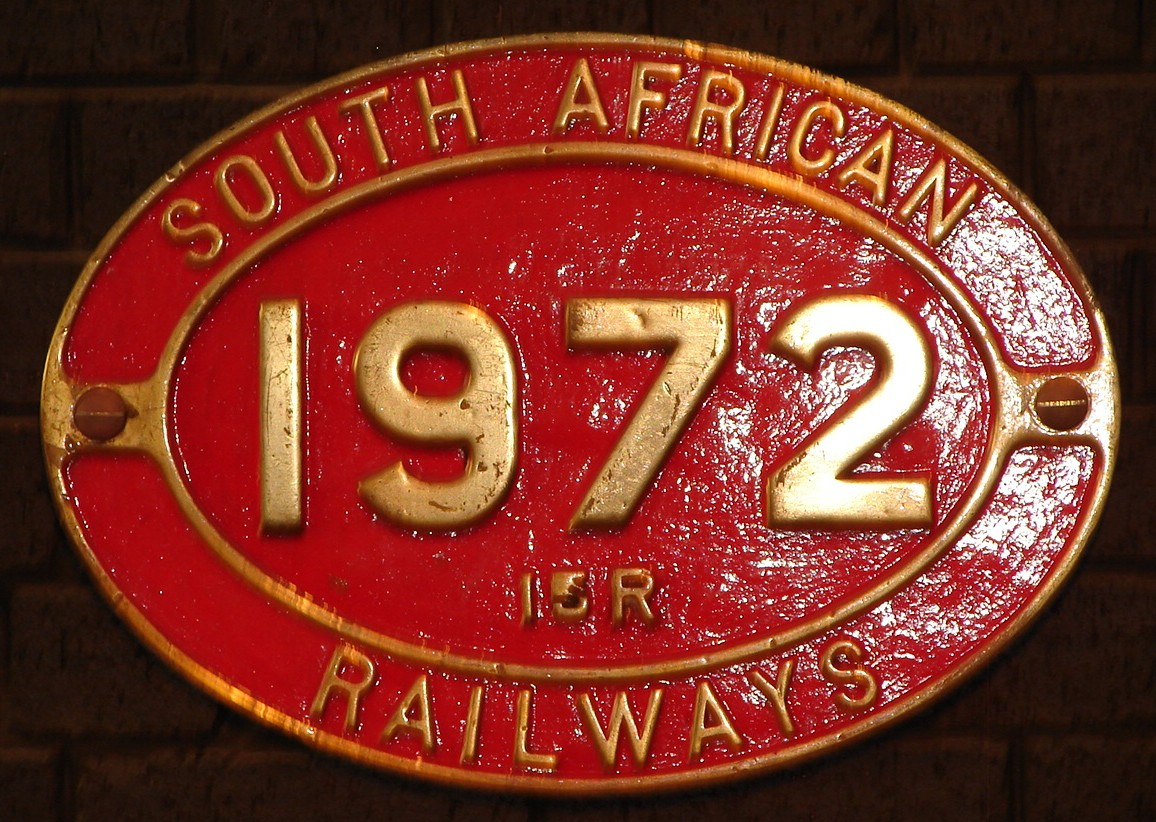
Class 15R

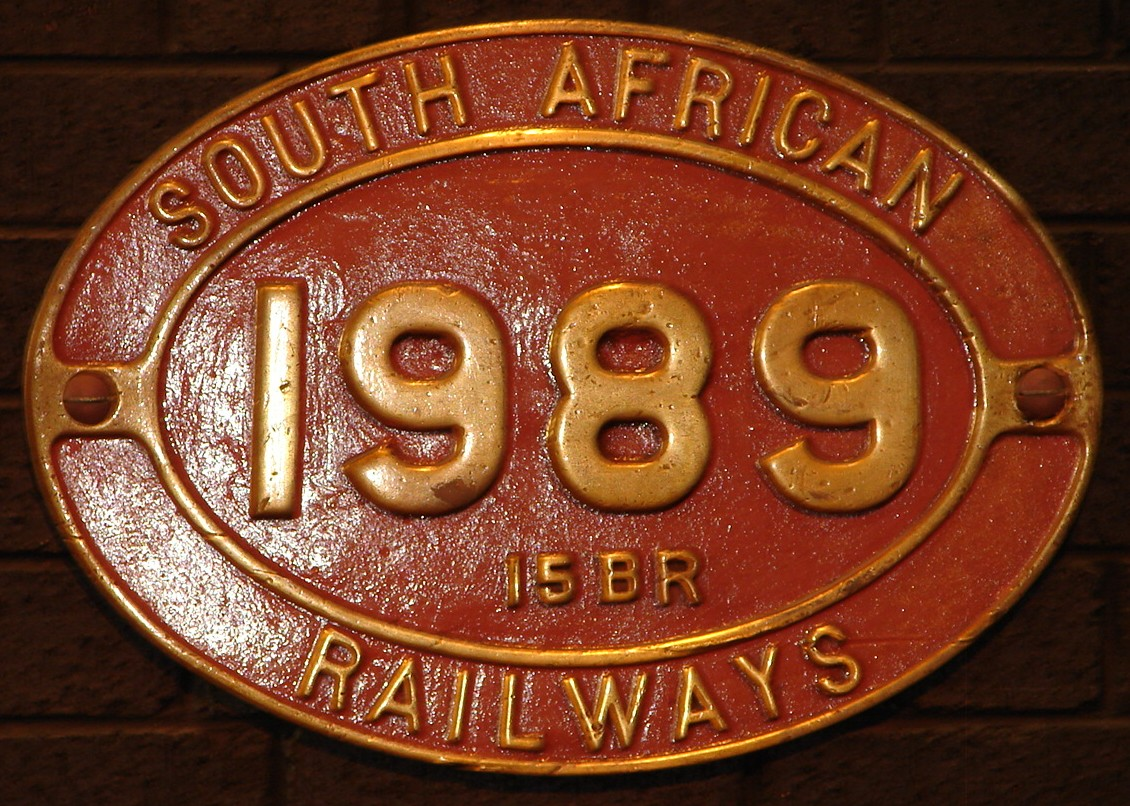
Class 15BR

During the 1930s, many serving locomotives were reboilered with a standard boiler type designed by A.G. Watson, CME of the SAR at the time, as part of his standardisation policy. Such Watson Standard reboilered locomotives were reclassified by adding an "R" suffix to their classification.

Eventually all thirty Class 15B locomotives were reboilered with Watson Standard no. 2A boilers and reclassified to Class 15BR. The number plate of no. 1972, as illustrated, had the "B" omitted in error.

Only slight modifications were found necessary to accept the Watson Standard boilers. With the new boilers, the side running boards and platforms were attached to the engine frames instead of to the boilers as in the original design. In the reboilering process, the boiler pitch was raised from 7 feet 9 inches (2,362 millimetres) to 8 feet 1 1/2 inches (2,476 millimetres), which raised the chimney height from 12 feet 10 inches (3,912 millimetres) to 13 feet 3/4 inch (3,981 millimetres). As also happened with the Class 14C, this exceeded the loading gauge height of 13 feet (3,962 millimetres) above the railhead. These were the only two locomotive types where the height restriction had been exceeded by 1945.

Their original Belpaire boilers were fitted with Ramsbottom safety valves, while the Watson Standard boiler was fitted with Pop safety valves. Early conversions were equipped with copper and later conversions with steel fireboxes. In the process of reboilering they were also equipped with Watson cabs, with their distinctive slanted fronts compared to the conventional vertical fronts of their original cabs, to enable easier access to the firebox stays.

An obvious difference between an original and a Watson Standard reboilered locomotive is usually a rectangular regulator cover, just to the rear of the chimney on the reboilered locomotive. In the case of the Class 15B and Class 15BR, two even more obvious differences are the Watson cab and the absence of the Belpaire firebox hump between the cab and boiler on the reboilered locomotives.

== Service ==
=== South African Railways ===
The Class 15B was placed in service in the eastern Orange Free State, but eventually spent most of their working lives in the Cape Midland, working south from Noupoort to Cradock and across to De Aar. When the Class 15F started taking over in that area, they were gradually relocated to Cape Town, from where they worked goods and passenger trains to the north. They also worked across Sir Lowry's Pass to Caledon and Bredasdorp in the Overberg and on the Bitterfontein line via Malmesbury and Klawer.

Some were shedded at Worcester and at Ashton for shunting. The usual way of exchanging the Ashton shunter every fortnight was for it to be used on the local passenger train which was normally hauled by a Garratt. They were withdrawn by 1976.

=== Caminhos de Ferro de Moçambique ===
In March and July 1973, twelve Class 15BR locomotives were sold in two batches to Caminhos de Ferro de Moçambique (CFM), the Mozambique Railways, which mainly used them for shunting at Lourenco Marques and occasionally on freight service to Swaziland. The SAR engine numbers of these locomotives were 1836, 1974, 1981, 1983, 1984 and 1986 sold in March 1973, and 1829, 1831, 1838, 1976, 1977 and 1985 sold in July 1973. The CFM renumbered the March batch to 421, 426 and 422 to 425, and the July batch to 427 to 432. This renumbering sequence could, however, not be ascertained with certainty.

=== Industrial ===
Six Class 15BR locomotives were sold into industrial use.

- Numbers 1972 and 1980 went to Tweefontein United Collieries.
- Numbers 1973, 1975, 1982 and 1990 went to the Randfontein Estates Gold Mine (REGM).

== Preservation ==
Number	Works nmr	THF / Private	Leaselend / Owner	Current Location	Outside South Africa	?
1832		THF		Queenstown Locomotive Depot		
1979		THF		Krugersdorp Locomotive Depot		

== Illustration ==
The main picture shows Class 15BR no. 1982 at Bonnievale on the Saturdays-only Worcester-Riversdale passenger train in February 1974. The following pictures show SAR no. 1838 as built, with a Belpaire firebox, and REGM no. R7, ex SAR Class 15BR no. 1990, with a Watson Standard boiler and round-top firebox, photographed on the Doornkop branch while heading a mine manager's tour of the REGM system on 14 September 1997.

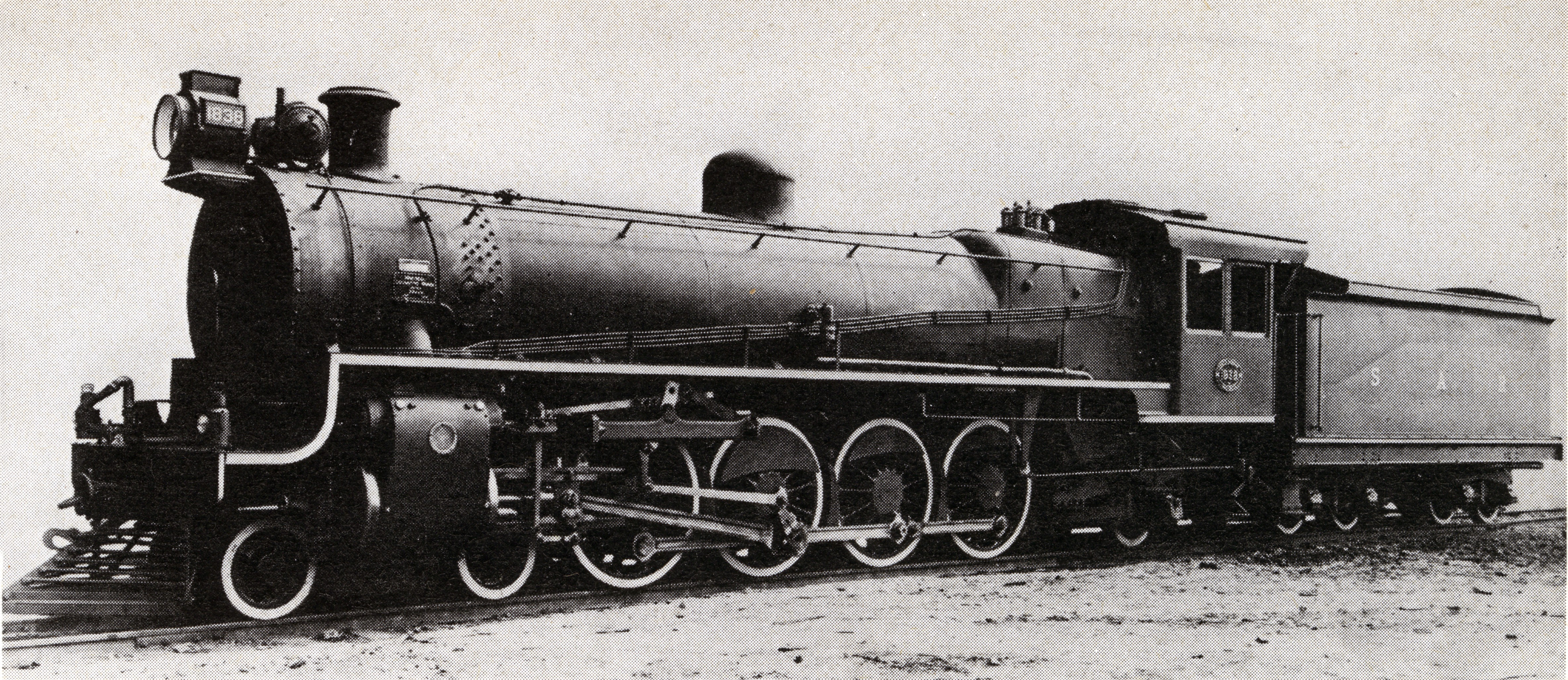
SAR no. 1838 as built with Belpaire firebox

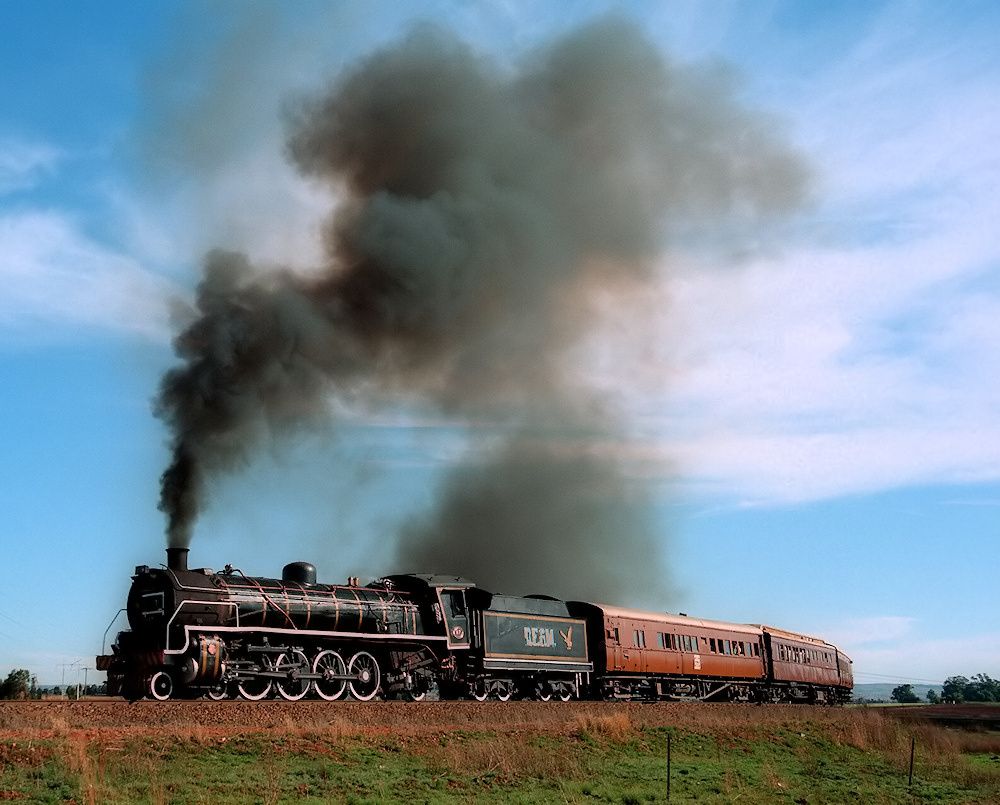
REGM no. R7 on the Doornkop branch
