= 4-8-2 =

Locomotive wheel arrangement

4-8-2 (Mountain)
- Front of locomotive at left

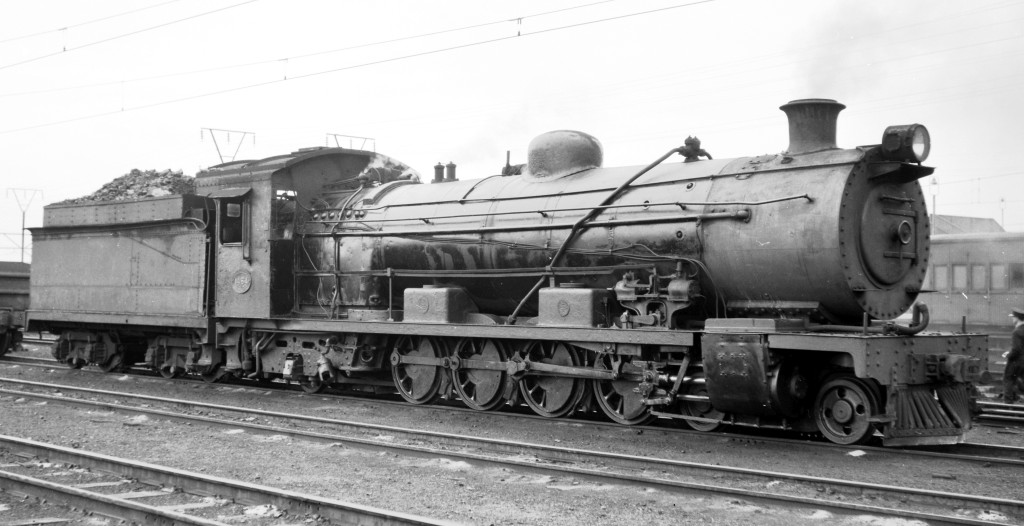
- NGR Hendrie D, an early example of a Mountain locomotive
Equivalent classifications
- UIC class: 2′D1
- French class: 241
- Turkish class: 47
- Swiss class: 4/7
- Russian class: 2-4-1
First known tank engine version
- First use: 1888
- Country: Colony of Natal
- Locomotive: NGR Class D, Dübs A
- Railway: Natal Government Railways
- Designer: William Milne
- Builder: Dübs & Company
- Evolved to: 4-10-2T
First known tender engine version
- First use: 1906
- Country: Colony of Natal
- Locomotive: NGR Altered Class B
- Railway: Natal Government Railways
- Designer: David Hendrie
- Builder: Natal Government Railways
- Evolved from: 4-8-0 modified
- Evolved to: 4-8-4
- Benefits: Improved stability at speed
First known "True type" version
- First use: 1911
- Country: United States
- Locomotive: No. 316 and 317
- Railway: Chesapeake and Ohio Railway
- Designer: American Locomotive Company
- Builder: American Locomotive Company (Richmond Locomotive Works)
- Evolved from: 4-6-2
- Benefits: Heavy freight haulage on mountainous sections of railway

Under the Whyte notation for the classification of steam locomotives, 4-8-2 represents the wheel arrangement of four leading wheels, eight powered and coupled driving wheels and two trailing wheels. This type of steam locomotive is commonly known as the Mountain type, though the New York Central Railroad used the name Mohawk for their 4-8-2s.

== Overview ==
The Colony of Natal in South Africa and New Zealand were innovators of the 4-8-2 Mountain wheel arrangement. The Natal Government Railways (NGR) placed in service the first tank engines with the 4-8-2 arrangement, and the NGR was also first to modify tender locomotives to use a 4-8-2 wheel arrangement. The New Zealand Railways Department (NZR) introduced the first tender locomotives designed and built as 4-8-2.

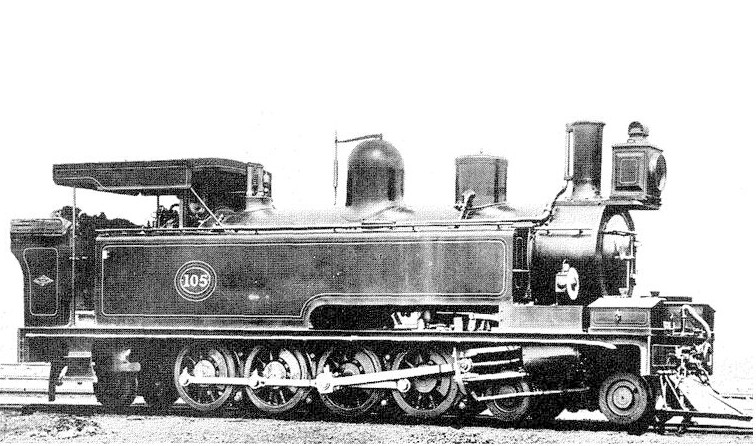
NGR Class D

In 1888, the Natal Government Railways placed the first five of its eventual one hundred Class D 4-8-2 tank locomotives in service. The locomotive was designed by William Milne, the locomotive superintendent of the NGR from 1877 to 1896, and was built by Dübs & Company. This was the first known use of the 4-8-2 wheel arrangement.

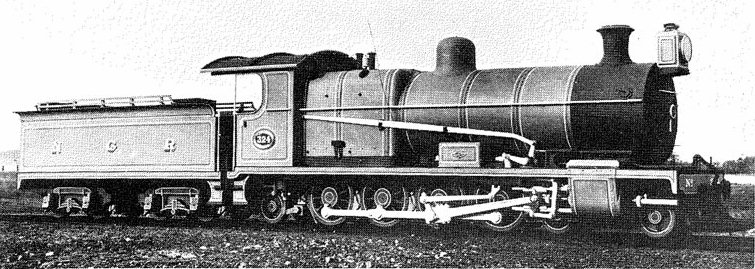
NGR Class B

In 1906, six NGR Class B 4-8-0 Mastodon locomotives, designed by D.A. Hendrie, NGR Locomotive Superintendent from 1903 to 1910, were modified to a 4-8-2 wheel arrangement by having trailing bissel trucks added below their cabs to improve their stability when hauling fast passenger trains. These altered Class B locomotives were the first 4-8-2 tender locomotives in the world.

The first locomotive to be designed and built as a 4-8-2 tender locomotive was New Zealand's X class, designed by Alfred Beattie and built by NZR's Addington Workshops in 1908. It was designed to haul heavy freight trains on the mountainous central section of the North Island Main Trunk. Some believed this was the source of the "Mountain" name of the 4-8-2 type, although it is also possible that the name was originated by the Chesapeake & Ohio Railway in the United States, who named the type after the Allegheny Mountains. The X class was, however, not a typical Mountain type, since its trailing truck served to spread the axle load rather than to allow a larger and wider firebox. The trailing wheels were positioned well behind a narrow firebox, which itself sat above the coupled wheels, necessitating the same design compromise between coupled wheel diameter and grate size as on a 2-8-0 Consolidation or 4-8-0 Twelve wheeler. A more common 4-8-2 design was a progression of the classic 4-6-2 Pacific layout, which featured a wide firebox positioned above the trailing truck and behind the coupled wheels, allowing for a wide and deep firebox as well as large coupled wheels.

The NGR in 1909 placed in service the first example of the more common Mountain design, when it commissioned five Class Hendrie D 4-8-2 tender locomotives. It was designed by Hendrie to handle coal traffic on the upper Natal mainline and, while it was based on the Class Hendrie B 4-8-0, it had the firebox positioned to the rear of the coupled wheels to make a larger grate and ashpan possible. To accomplish this, the plate frame was equipped with a cast bridle at the rear to accommodate the improved firebox design, and the load also necessitated the addition of a trailing truck. Five locomotives were built by the North British Locomotive Company and delivered in 1909. The 4-8-2 type went on to become the most widely used steam locomotive wheel arrangement in South Africa, with altogether thirty classes of both tank and tender versions eventually seeing service on the South African Railways.

== Usage ==
=== Angola ===
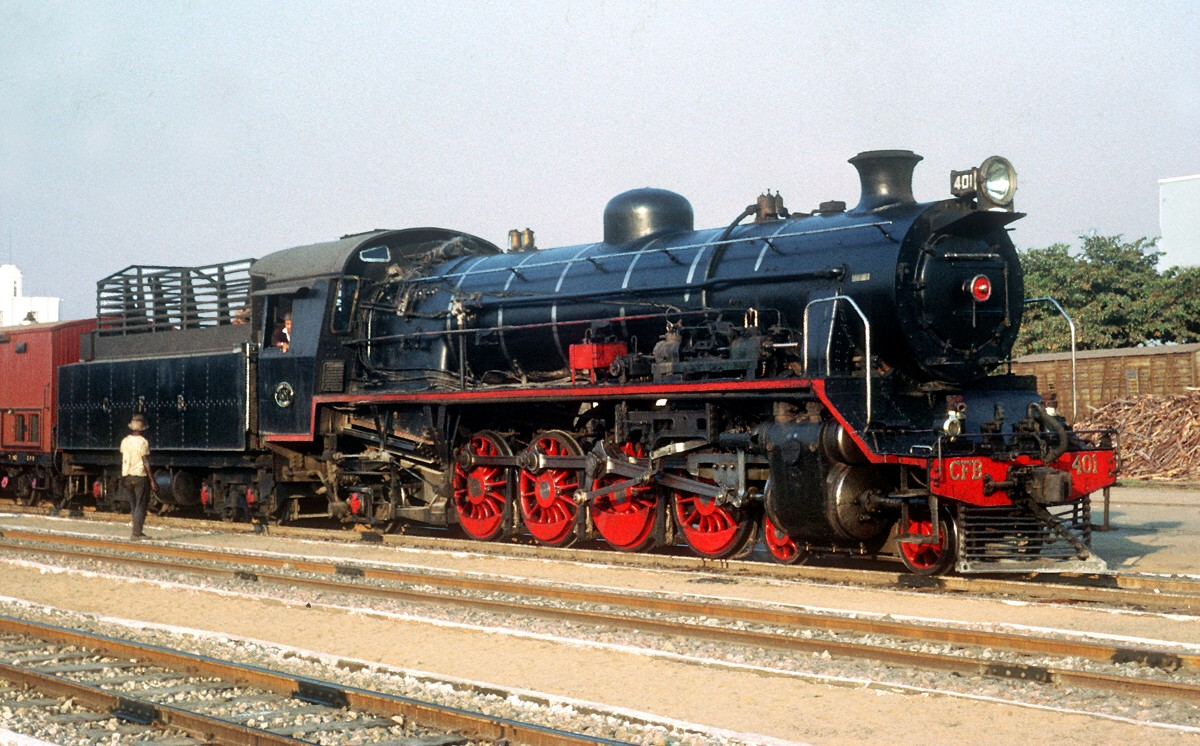
CFB 11th Class 4-8-2 No. 401 at Lobito Station, Angola

In 1951, six 4-8-2 locomotives were built by North British Locomotive Company to the design of the South African Class 19D for the Angolan Caminho de Ferro de Benguela (CFB or Benguela railway) as their 11th Class.

=== Australia ===
Unlike some other countries which utilised the 4-8-2 design for heavy passenger duties, the Australian 4-8-2 was more typically used as a heavy goods locomotive with small coupled wheels and a very large firebox.

The first 4-8-2 in Australia was the 3 ft 6 in (1,067 mm) gauge Q class of the Tasmanian Government Railways. Nineteen were built in batches between 1922 and 1945 by Perry Engineering in South Australia, Walkers Limited of Maryborough, Queensland and Clyde Engineering of New South Wales. Until 1950, the class handled the majority of mainline goods trains around the state.

Armstrong Whitworth built ten 500 class 4-8-2 locomotives for the South Australian Railways in 1926. They were the most powerful locomotives in Australia at the time and the heaviest non-articulated locomotives yet built in the United Kingdom. In 1929, they were modified to 500B class 4-8-4 Northern locomotives.

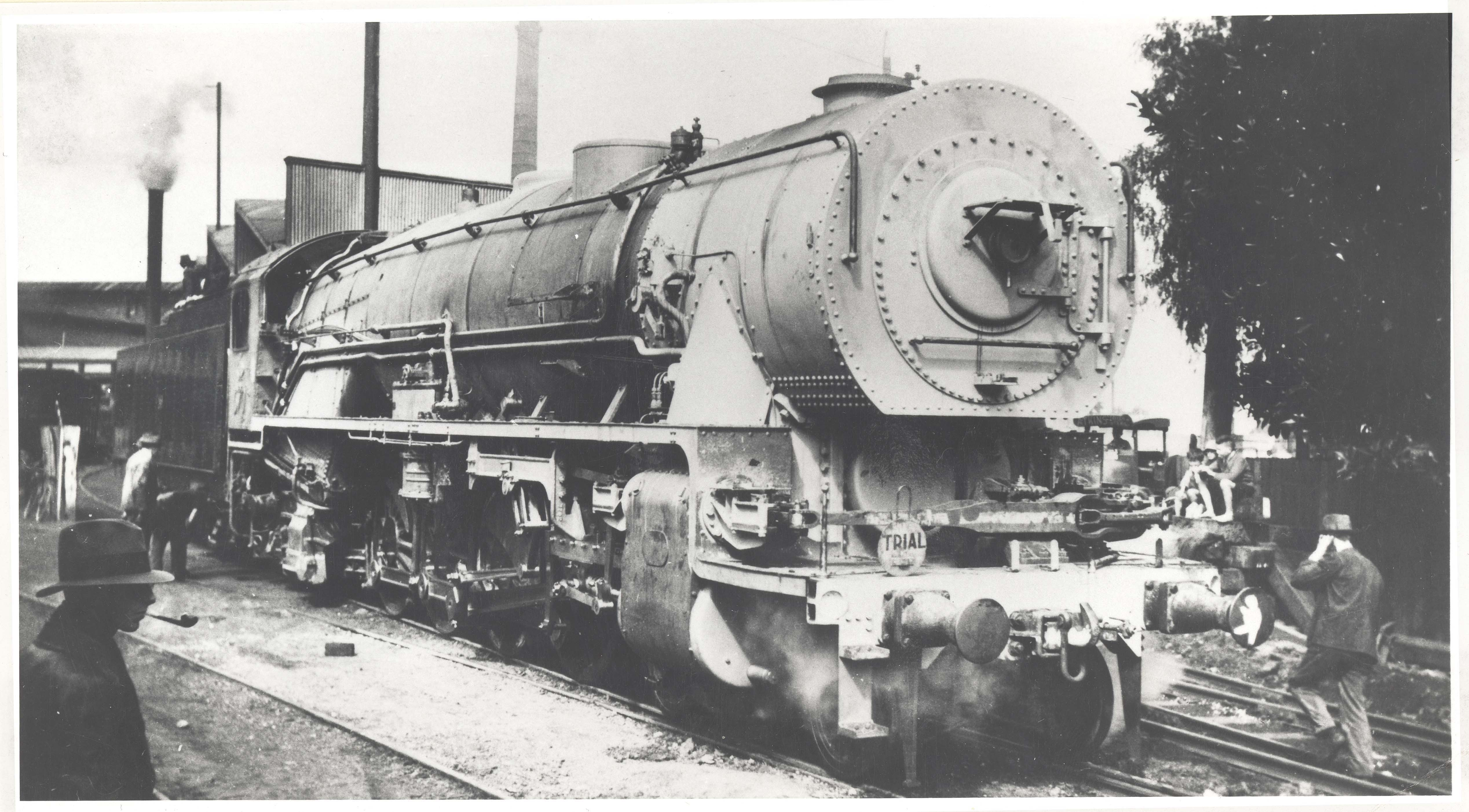
NSWGR D57 class No. 5701

The three-cylinder D57 class locomotive of the New South Wales Government Railways (NSWGR) was one of the largest and most powerful locomotives ever built in Australia. Twenty-five were built by Clyde Engineering from 1929. With their large 65 square feet (6 square metres) grates and 64,327 pounds-force (286 kilonewtons) tractive effort, they were put to good use on the steep, 1 in 33 (3%) and 1 in 40 (2½%) gradients leading out of Sydney on the New South Wales mainlines.

The D57 design was developed further in 1950 with the smaller cylindered D58 class, of which thirteen were built at the Eveleigh and Cardiff Locomotive Workshops of the NSWGR. This class proved to be less successful, suffering from reliability problems attributed to the rack and pinion valve gear that was used for the third cylinder instead of the Gresley-Holcroft valve gear that was used on the D57 class.

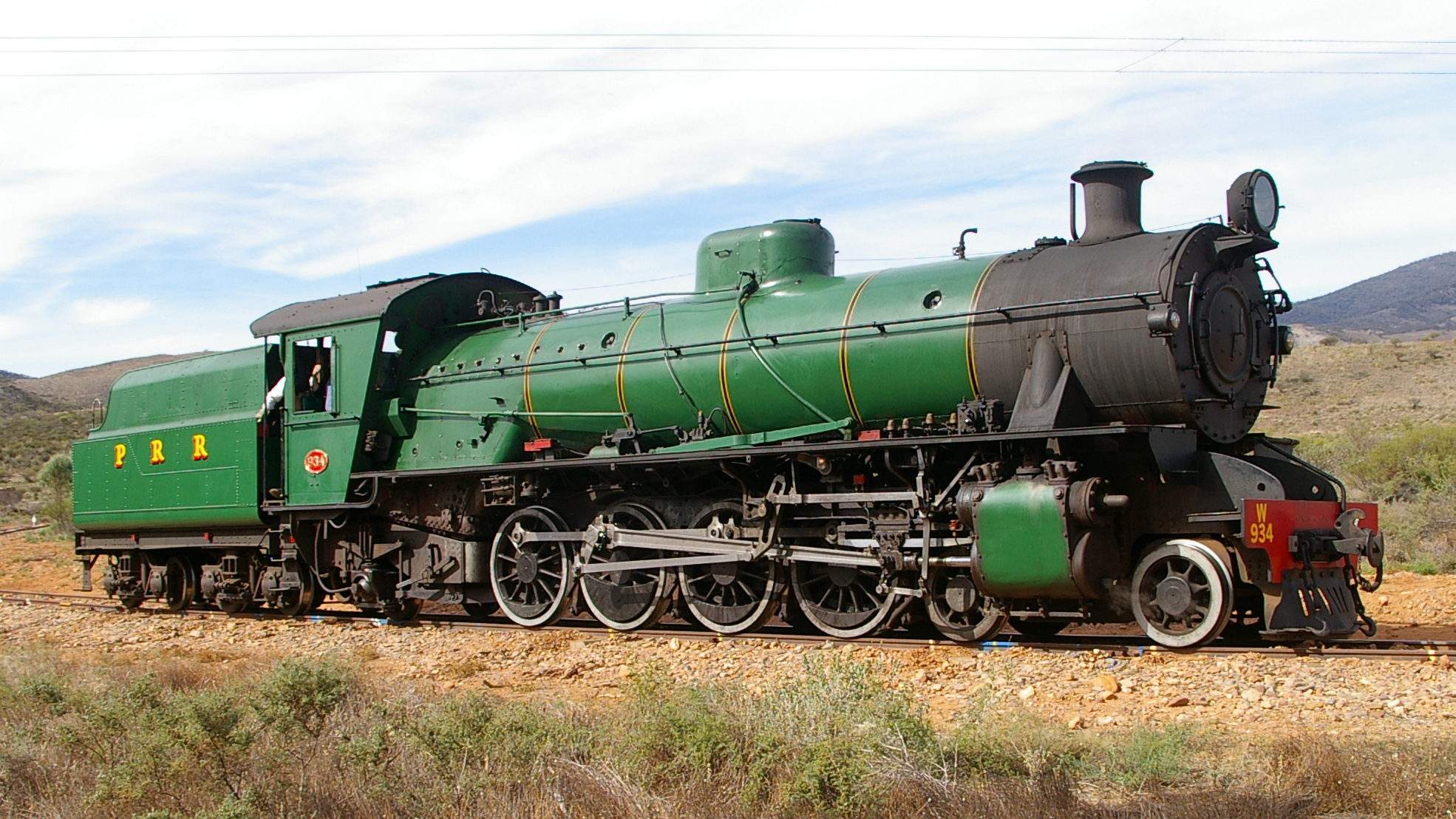
WAGR W class No. W934

The Western Australian Government Railways (WAGR) introduced two classes of 4-8-2 locomotives for freight haulage on the state's 3 ft 6 in (1,067 mm) network. The first was the S class, of which ten were built at the WAGR Midland Railway Workshops from 1943, with the locomotives named after West Australian mountains. The second was the W class, of which 64 were built by Beyer, Peacock & Company in 1951 and 1952. The 4-8-2 layout allowed for the weight of these relatively powerful locomotives to be spread over a number of axles, resulting in the W class having a maximum axle load of less than 10 tons. It also enabled the incorporation of a wide firebox for burning poor-quality coal.

In 1951, the Tasmanian Government Railways purchased a modern 4-8-2 locomotive, the H class. Eight locomotives were built by Vulcan Foundry for freight train working.

=== Bulgaria ===
In 1941, the Bulgarian State Railways (BDZ) placed an order with Henschel & Son in Germany for fifty BDZ class 03 express passenger locomotives. They were of the type 2′D1′h3S (2-4-1 axle arrangement, simple steam expansion, superheating, three-cylinder, fast train service) and were designed to be capable of hauling heavy passenger trains over the often severe profiles of the 4 ft 8 1/2 in (1,435 mm) standard gauge Bulgarian mainlines, with gradients of up to 2.8%.

The first two locomotives were delivered by the end of 1941. During trials, it proved that the specifications of the BDZ designing engineers were correct and that they had successfully overcome the shortcomings of insufficient power and some construction problems that had been experienced with the BDZ 2-8-2 Mikado class 01 1′D1′h2S and class 02 1′D1′h3S locomotives. Mass production began the following year, but was interrupted by war restrictions introduced by the German authorities and delivery was halted before the full order was filled. Only ten more locomotives were built and delivered at the end of 1942 and early 1943, and the total number of the BDZ class 03 remained at twelve locomotives, numbered 03.01 to 03.12.

After 1958, these locomotives were gradually converted to mixed fuel oil and coal firing, which resulted in improved steaming ability and better performance, particularly on mountainous lines. During their 35 years of service, they exhibited excellent performance with only minor problems such as oval wear on the leading axle's inside crank. After factory repair, one of these locomotives, no. 03.12, was preserved in the depot at Gorna Oryahovitsa and returned to operation for tourist trains.

=== Canada ===
The Angus Shops of Canadian Pacific (CP) built a pair of 4-8-2 locomotives in 1914. While they were not replicated, CP kept them in service for thirty years. CP reverted to 4-6-2 Pacific locomotives before moving on to the 4-6-4 Hudson.

Canadian National operated eighty U-1 class 4-8-2 locomotives in passenger service, built by Montreal Locomotive Works in 1944. The last twenty, designated the U-1-f class, were delivered with semi-streamlined conical smokebox covers that earned them the nickname of Bullet Nose Bettys.

=== Czechoslovakia ===
The Czechoslovak State Railways (ČSD) introduced the 498.0 class 4-8-2 express passenger locomotive in 1938 following successful trials in the Tatra Mountains comparing it to an alternative 2-8-4 Berkshire prototype. In 1954, the design was developed further into the 498.1 class. These technically sophisticated locomotives were reputedly capable of 11% thermal efficiency.

The ČSD also built a lighter and more numerous 475 class 4-8-2 locomotive.

=== France ===
In France, the 4-8-2 Mountain, known as the 241 type based on its axle arrangement, began to be used on the more undulating routes as increasingly heavy loads, brought about by the introduction of all-steel passenger cars after 1918, began to overtax the hill-climbing capabilities of the existing 4-6-2 Pacific and the speed capabilities of 2-8-2 Mikado locomotives. Altogether 275 4-8-2 locomotives were built for French service.

- The Chemins de fer de l'Est (Est) took delivery of a prototype 4-8-2 four-cylinder compound locomotive from its own Épernay shops in 1925. This was the first Mountain type to be built for commercial service within France. The Est subsequently ordered forty production locomotives in 1930, based on the prototype design but with improvements. Delivery took place over the following three years. One of these, 241.004, ended up in Germany during World War II and served in the East German Deutsche Reichsbahn until 1955 as DR 08 1001, the only 4-8-2 Mountain in German service.
- Between 1930 and 1932, the Chemins de Fer de l'État (État) obtained 49 locomotives built to the 4-8-2 design of the Est. Under SNCF management after 1938, these locomotives were transferred to the Est region and served there for the rest of their service lives.
- The Chemins de fer de Paris à Lyon et à la Méditerranée (PLM) introduced 145 bullet-nosed Class 241A compound Mountain types in 1925 to increase train speeds over the Seuil de Bourgogne incline. This four-cylinder compound locomotive was unusual in having short connecting rods for the outside high-pressure cylinders that connected to the first driving axle rather than the second, as was typical of most six- or eight-coupled locomotives. Possibly as a result of this, the locomotive did not run smoothly at speeds faster than 100 kilometres per hour (62 miles per hour). In addition, to limit the weight the built-up locomotive frames were lightly constructed, which allowed torsion and flexing that caused the wheel bearings to overheat. This problem was never solved on the PLM engines. However, despite these shortcomings and true to the Mountain type, they were still able to haul heavy passenger trains over gradients at speed and could take an 800 tonne load over a 1 in 200 gradient at 90 to 100 kilometres per hour (56 to 62 miles per hour).

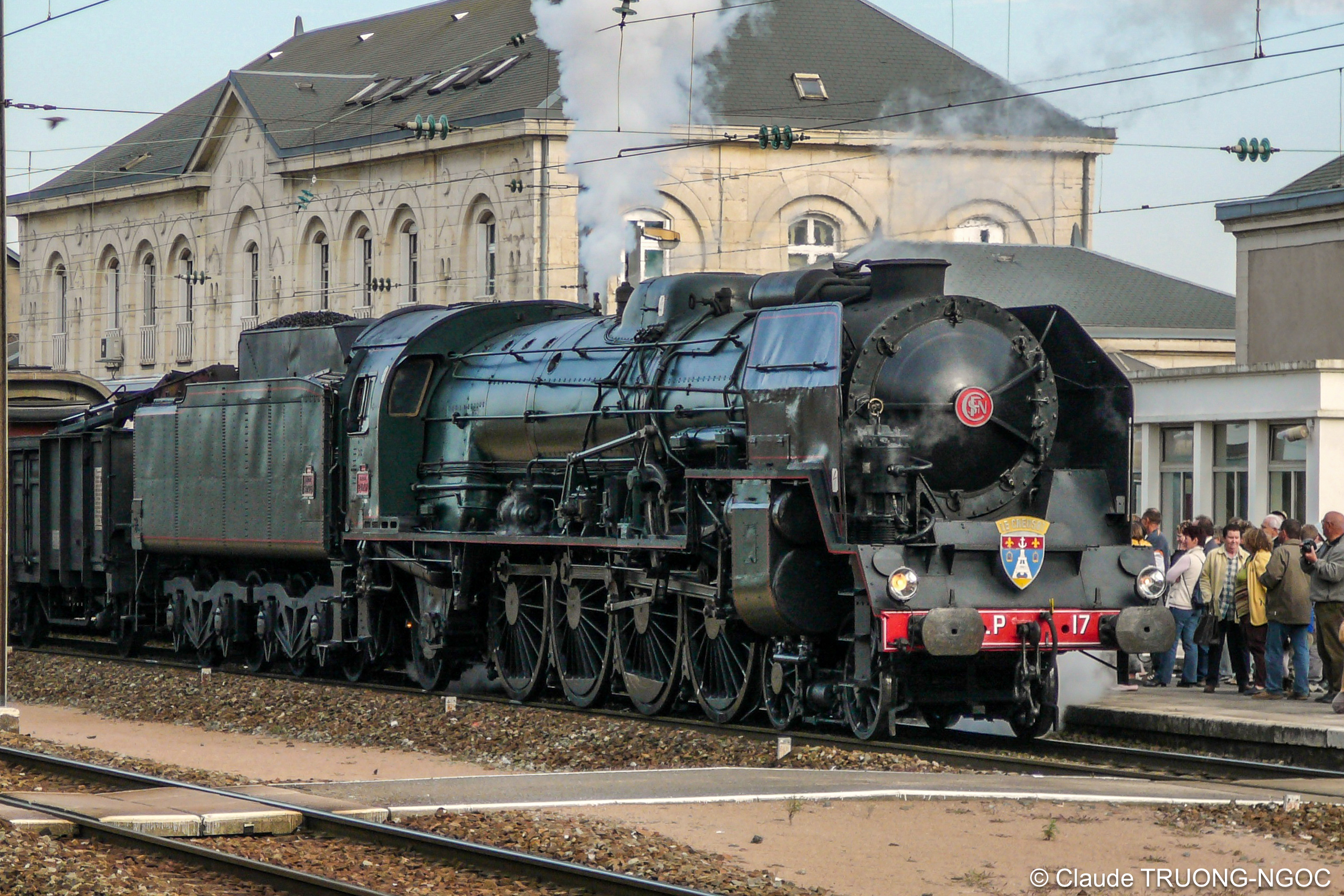
SNCF Class 241P No. 241.P 17

- Based on the Class 241A, the unique PLM Class 241C1, built in 1930, had connecting rods linking the second and third driving axles. This locomotive served as the prototype for development of the post-war standard SNCF Class 241P.
- The PLM also experimented with a high-pressure watertube boiler on the unique PLM 241B1 prototype, constructed with a German Schmidt-Henschel boiler in 1930. Soon it was learned, however, that this locomotive was a failure; it was retired and broken up by the mid-1930s.
- The État also built a prototype three-cylinder simple expansion 4-8-2 locomotive in 1932, the 241.101, which was an embarrassing failure for the company but which was later converted by André Chapelon into the legendary SNCF Class 242A1 4-8-4 Northern locomotive.
- The SNCF, with design input from André Chapelon, developed the earlier PLM 241C1 into the 35-strong Class 241P in 1948. These locomotives, although prone to axle box problems caused by a frame that was not rigid enough for the 4,000 indicated horsepower (3,000 kilowatts) output of the cylinders, were nevertheless very effective and some were still running in the early 1970s.

=== Mozambique ===
In March and July 1973, twelve reboilered South African Railways Class 15BR locomotives, built by Montreal Locomotive Works (MLW) in Canada between 1918 and 1922, were sold to Caminhos de Ferro de Moçambique (CFM), the Mozambique Railways, where they were mainly used for shunting at Lourenco Marques and occasionally on freight service to Swaziland.

=== New Zealand ===
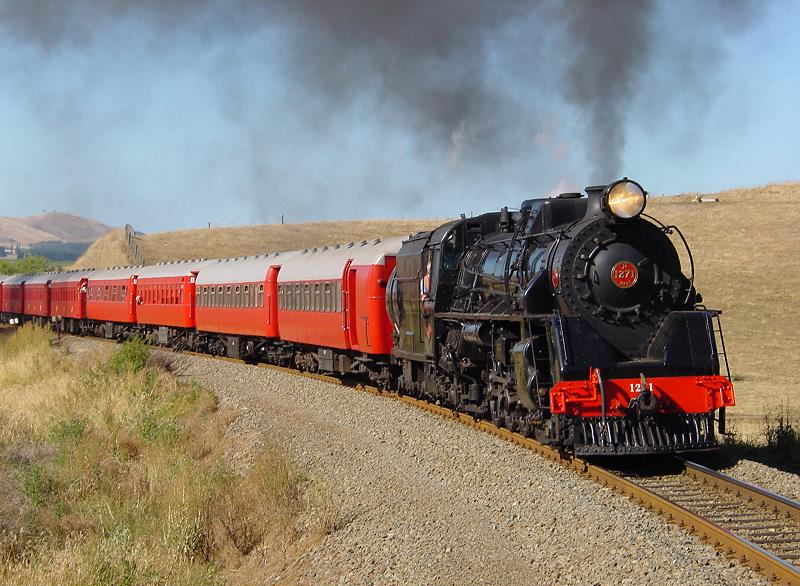
NZR J^{A} class No. 1271

The first of eighteen X class 4-8-2 De Glehn compound locomotives, designed by Alfred Beattie, the Chief Mechanical Engineer of the New Zealand Railways Department (NZR) between 1900 and 1913, was built by the NZR's Addington Workshops in Christchurch in 1908. The first locomotive in the world to be designed and built as a 4-8-2 tender locomotive, it was designed to haul heavy freight trains on the newly completed mountainous central section of the North Island Main Trunk. One member of the pioneering X class survives and is currently located at the depot of the Feilding and District Steam Rail Society.

Between 1940 and 1956, 91 J and J^{A} class locomotives entered service. Of these, 56 were built by North British Locomotive Company and 35 by the Hillside Railway Workshops in Dunedin. These locomotives survived in service until 1971 and were the last in-service steam locomotives on the NZR. Ten have been preserved. An oil fired derivative of the J class, the JB class also utilized the Mountain type wheel arrangement.

=== Philippines ===
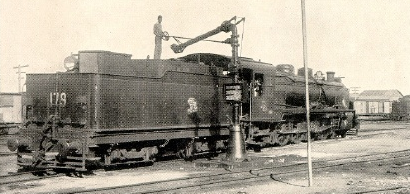
The Manila Railroad Company, now the Philippine National Railways, operated two classes before and after World War II. The first class was the pre-war 170 class. Ten locomotives were built in 1921 by Alco. Three units were refurbished after being damaged by the war. In 1948, another ten locomotives, numbered the 100-class, were ordered from the Pennsylvania-based Vulcan Iron Works. Another 10 were built in 1948. Both the rebuilt 170 class and the new 100 class were decommissioned starting in 1956, when MRR ordered the replacement of all its steam locomotives with diesel locomotives such as the GE UM12C. None of these locomotives were preserved like all of MRR's steam locomotives.

=== Poland ===
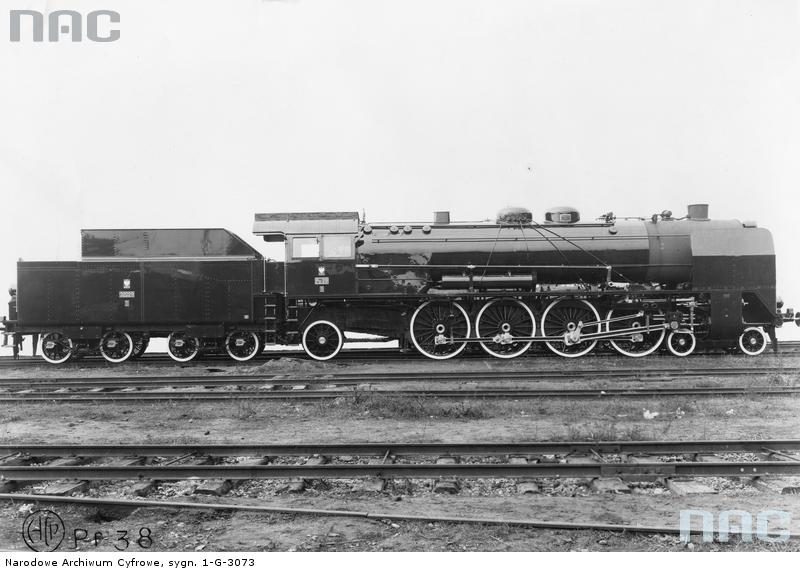
Pu29

In 1931 three Pu29 mountains were delivered to PKP. They were used predominantly to pull heavy trains between East Prussia exclave and main territory of Germany, transiting through the Polish Pomerania, also known as the Polish Corridor.

=== Rhodesia ===
==== Northern Rhodesia ====
Two 4-8-2 locomotives were built in 1952 by Henschel & Son to the design of the South African Class 19D, for the Nkana copper mines in Northern Rhodesia (now Zambia). They were numbered 337 and 338 in the Rhodesia Railways 19th class number range.

==== Southern Rhodesia ====
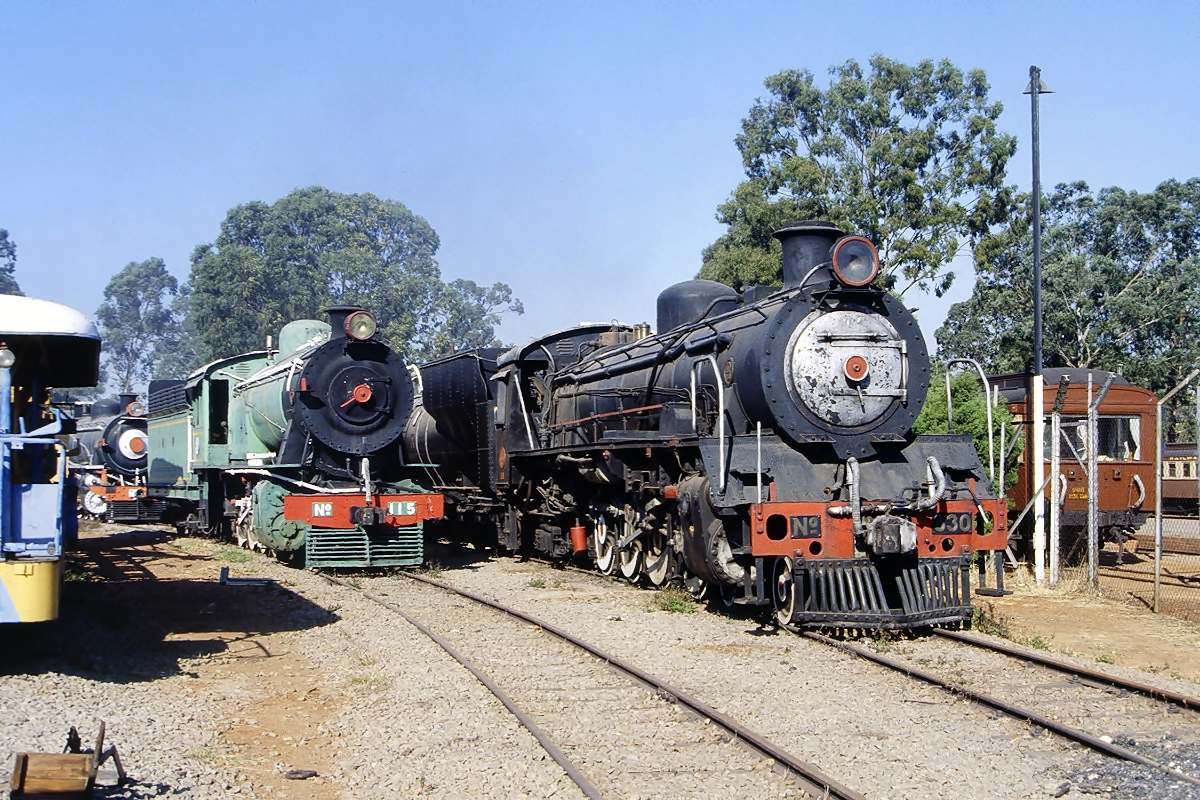
Rhodesia Railways 19th Class, at right

A lighter version of the South African Class 4A 4-8-2 was built for the Rhodesia Railways (RR) by North British Locomotive Company (NBL) in 1921. It was designated the RR 10th Class and was used on the long section south of Bulawayo in Southern Rhodesia (now Zimbabwe) through Bechuanaland Protectorate (now Botswana) to Mafeking in the Cape Province. Like the South African Class 4A, the RR 10th Class had a combustion chamber, the only RR locomotive class with this feature.

Between 1951 and 1953, 21 4-8-2 locomotives were built for RR by Henschel & Son to the design of the South African Class 19D, as their 19th class and 19C class. Their tenders were similar to the South African version's Torpedo, but with plate frame instead of Buckeye bogies. One of these, the sole RR 19C class, was built as a condensing locomotive.

In 1955, four more, without superheating and numbered from 1 to 4, were built to the design of the South African Class 19D by NBL for the Wankie Colliery in Southern Rhodesia.

=== South Africa ===
Tank locomotives

Of the thirty classes of 4-8-2 locomotives to see service on the South African Railways (SAR), four were tank locomotives.

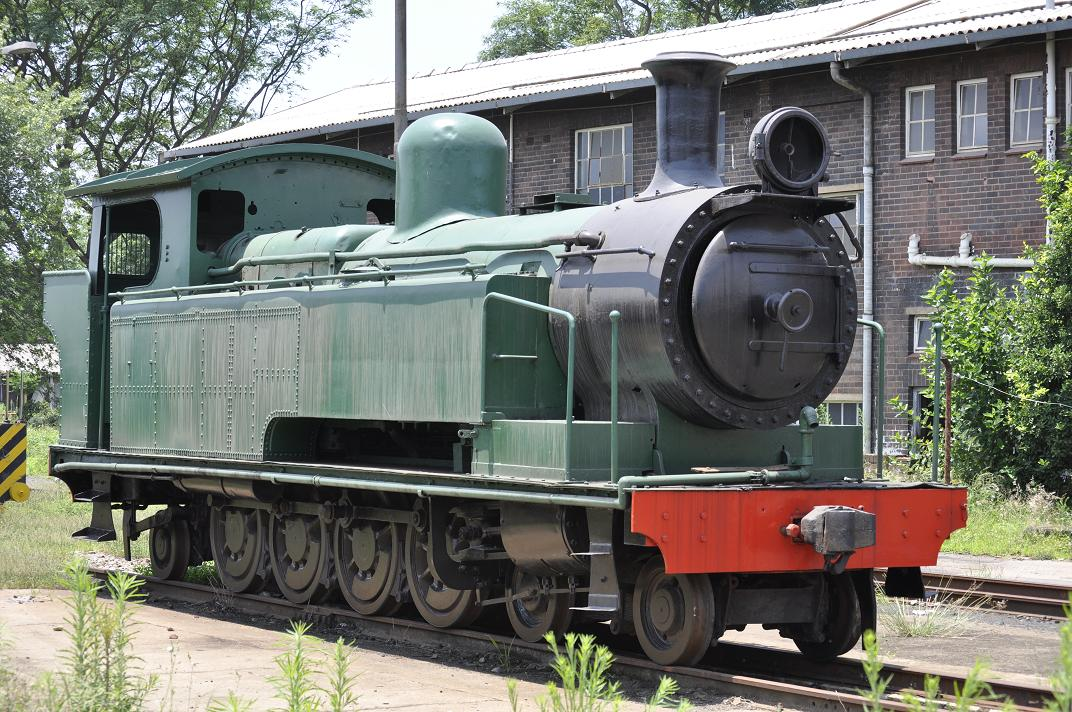
Ex NGR Class D, SAR Class A

- The first locomotive in the world to be designed with this wheel arrangement was the Class D 4-8-2T tank of the Natal Government Railways (NGR), the brain-child of Locomotive Superintendent William Milne and built by Dübs & Company. Altogether 100 of these locomotives were delivered in ten batches between 1888 and 1899. In 1912, they came into SAR stock and were designated Class A.
- When the 4-10-2T Reid Tenwheelers of the NGR, designed by Locomotive Superintendent G.W. Reid, began to be withdrawn from mainline service for branch line and shunting duties c. 1909, they were gradually converted to a 4-8-2T wheel arrangement by removing the fifth set of coupled wheels. In 1912, five such converted locomotives, originally built by Dübs between 1901 and 1903, were designated Class H2 on the SAR. The SAR converted many more Reid Ten-wheelers to 4-8-2T, but reclassified only the first three of these to Class H2, while the rest retained their Class H classification even after modification.
- In 1902, the Imperial Military Railways placed 35 4-10-2T tank locomotives in service, built by Dübs and Neilson, Reid and Company to the specifications of the Reid Tenwheeler of the NGR. They became the Class E on the Central South African Railways, who converted six of them to 4-8-2T tank locomotives. In 1912, the five survivors were designated Class H1 on the SAR.
- In 1904, the NGR placed 25 Class E 4-8-2T tank locomotives in service. It was the first locomotive to be designed for the NGR by locomotive superintendent D.A. Hendrie and was built by North British Locomotive Company (NBL). In 1912, these locomotives were designated Class G by the SAR.

Tender locomotives

Between 1909 and 1953, when the Class 25 and Class 25NC 4-8-4 Northern locomotives arrived on the scene, 4-8-2 Mountain tender locomotives became the most popular goods locomotives on South African rails. Between 1906 and 1938 altogether 26 different classes of 4-8-2 locomotives were acquired for mainline and branch line service.

In 1906, the NGR modified six of its Class B 4-8-0 Mastodon locomotives, built by NBL in 1904, to Class Altered B locomotives to improve their stability on passenger trains. This made them the first tender locomotives in the world with a 4-8-2 wheel arrangement. In 1912, they were classified as Class 1B by the SAR.

The SAR Class 3 originated on the NGR. Three variants were introduced between 1909 and 1912.

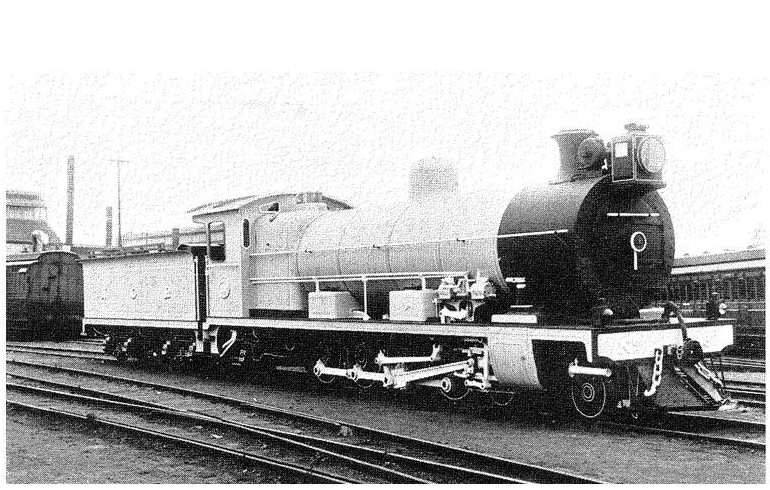
Ex NGR Class Hendrie D, SAR Class 3

- In 1909, the NGR commissioned the first of thirty Class B (1909) 4-8-2 tender locomotives, also known as the Hendrie D. Designed by D.A. Hendrie to handle coal traffic on the upper Natal mainline and based on his altered Class B 4-8-2 Mountain of 1906, the firebox was positioned to the rear of the coupled wheels to make an improved grate and ashpan possible. Although not the first tender locomotives designed and built as 4-8-2, they were the first examples of the most common 4-8-2 design. They were built by NBL in 1909 and 1910. In 1912, they were designated Class 3 on the SAR.
- In 1910, the NGR placed a single experimental Class B American D 4-8-2 locomotive in service, built by the American Locomotive Company (ALCO). The locomotive was similar to the Class B Hendrie D and was nicknamed Maude Allan by the enginemen. In 1912, it became the sole Class 3A on the SAR.
- In 1912, the SAR took delivery of ten Class 3B Mountain locomotives that had been ordered by the NGR the year before. Designed by Hendrie and built by NBL, these locomotives had plate frames, Walschaerts valve gear and Belpaire fireboxes and were the first of Hendrie's designs to have superheaters and piston valves instead of slide valves.

The Class 4 originated on the Cape Government Railways (CGR). Two variants were introduced in 1911 and 1913.

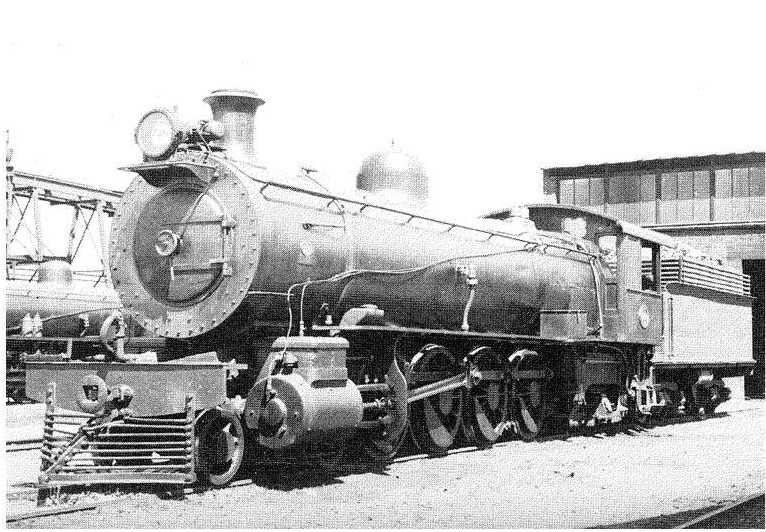
Class 4 at Worcester

- In 1911, the CGR placed two 4-8-2 Mountain locomotives in service. Designed by chief locomotive superintendent H.M. Beatty as a heavy mixed traffic locomotive with Stephenson valve gear and that used saturated steam, they were built by NBL. They were not classified on the CGR but a year later, when they were taken onto the SAR roster, they were designated Class 4.
- In 1913 and 1914, ten Class 4A locomotives were placed in service by the SAR. Built by NBL, it was an improved version of the predecessor Class 4, with a superheater and Walschaerts valve gear. Like their two forerunners, they were excellent steamers and, with the improvements, gave a much better performance.

Three Class 12 variants were introduced by the SAR between 1912 and 1920.

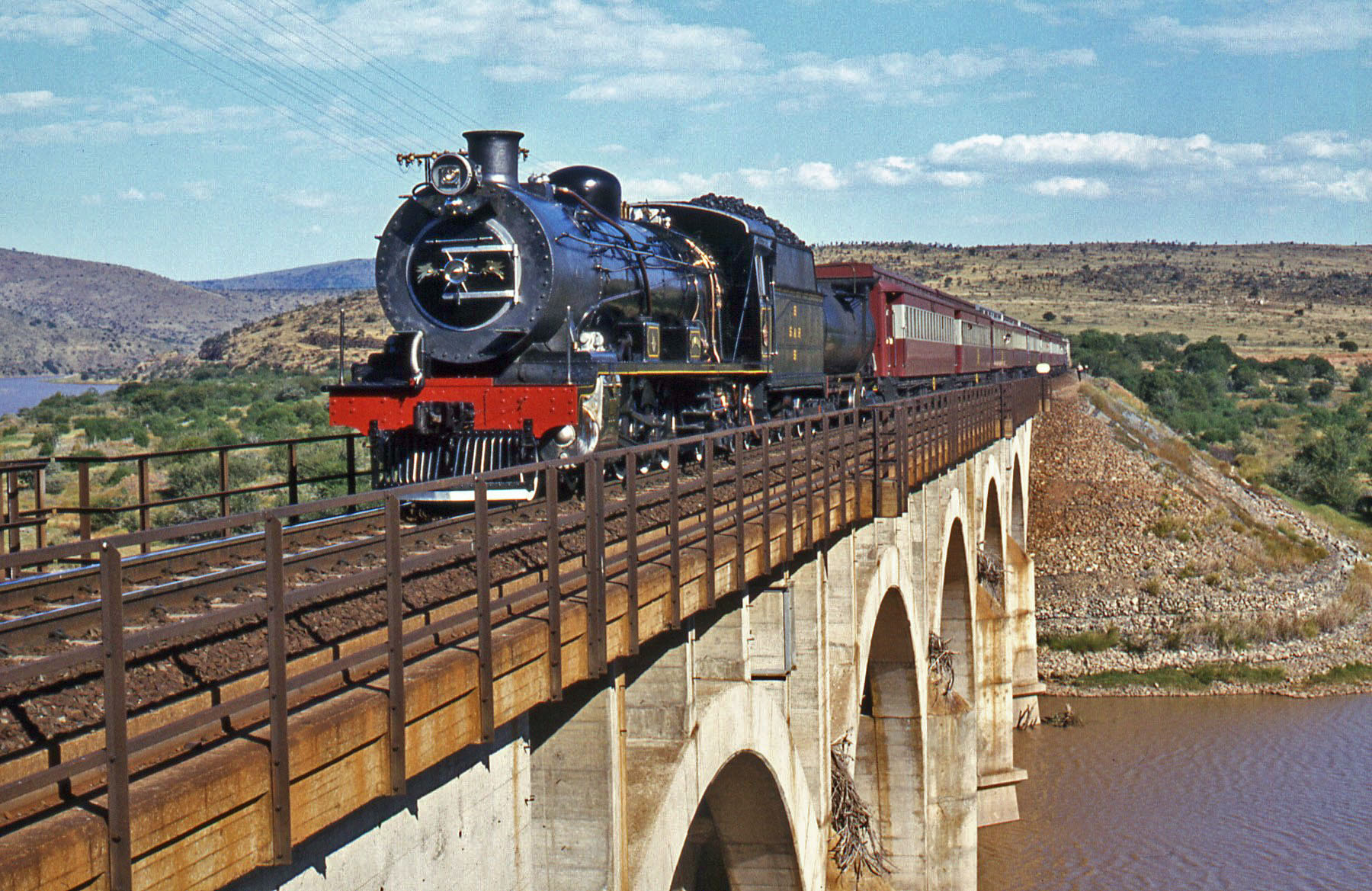
Class 12R crossing the Great Fish River

- Between 1912 and 1922, the SAR placed 46 Class 12 locomotives in service. Designed by SAR chief mechanical engineer (CME) D.A. Hendrie for use in coal traffic on the line from Witbank to Germiston, they were the largest non-articulated locomotives in South Africa at the time. The first 26 were built by NBL between 1912 and 1915 and the remainder by Beyer, Peacock & Company (BP) in 1922.
- Between 1919 and 1929, 67 Class 12A locomotives entered service. It was the final locomotive design by Hendrie and one of his finest. An improved and larger version of his Class 12, with larger diameter cylinders and a redesigned boiler that included a combustion chamber, it was superheated and had Walschaerts valve gear and a Belpaire firebox. Forty-eight were built by NBL between 1919 and 1929 and 19 by Henschel & Son in Germany in 1928 and 1929.
- In 1920, the SAR placed thirty Class 12B locomotives in service, built to the Class 12 design by Baldwin Locomotive Works in the United States. They were very similar to the second and subsequent orders of the Class 12 but were classified separately as Class 12B, possibly merely because they were American-built while the Class 12 was British-built.

Four Class 14 variants were introduced by the SAR between 1913 and 1918.

- Between 1913 and 1915, the SAR placed 45 Class 14 locomotives in service. Designed by Hendrie as a development of the Class 12, it was built by Robert Stephenson & Company. With 48 inches (1,219 millimetres) coupled wheels, it was evolved as intermediate locomotive between the Class 3B with its 45 inches (1,143 millimetres) coupled wheels and the Class 12 with its 51 inches (1,300 millimetres) coupled wheels.
- In 1914 and 1915, 41 Class 14A locomotives entered service. Also designed by Hendrie, it was a lighter locomotive for use on coastal lines and was built by NBL. Like the Class 14, it also had Walschaerts valve gear, a Belpaire firebox and was superheated, but it had a smaller boiler and smaller cylinders to reduce the axle loading.
- In 1915, fifteen Class 14B locomotives entered service. Built by BP, its intended use was on the lower section of the Natal mainline where speeds were low with frequent stops, and Hendrie therefore designed them without superheaters. In service, the omission of superheating soon became controversial; by 1927 all of them were converted to superheating and reclassified to Class 14. Of all the locomotives introduced by Hendrie, the Class 14B was the only one to fall short of expectations.

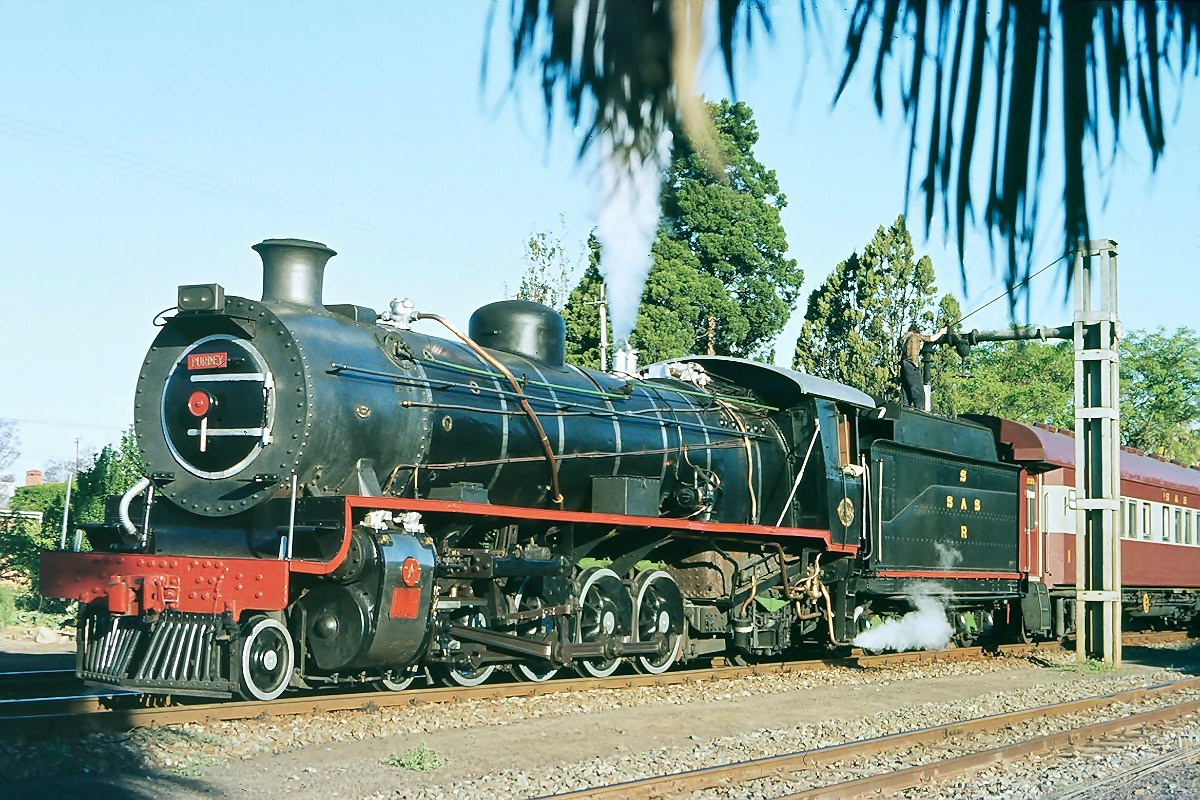
Class 14CRB No. 2004 at Robertson

- Between 1918 and 1922, 73 Class 14C locomotives were ordered from the Montreal Locomotive Works (MLW), in Canada, as a result of wartime disruption in Europe. While built to Hendrie's specifications, they were designed by MLW, resulting in a locomotive with some typical North American characteristics and with American-style high running boards. The locomotives were delivered in four batches, all four with different engine weights and maximum axle loads. Through re-boilerings and re-balancings during its service life, this single class eventually ended up as six different locomotive classes.

SAR introduced seven Class 15 variants between 1914 and 1938.

- In 1914, ten Class 15 locomotives entered service, built by NBL and designed by Hendrie as large mixed traffic locomotives with larger 57 inches (1,448 millimetres) coupled wheels for use in the Orange Free State, where grades and curvature were less severe than on the coastal sections. To reduce the weight on the trailing wheels, steel fireboxes were used, a feature that became standard on large locomotives, but necessitated the introduction of water treatment plants in some parts of the country to prevent corrosion.

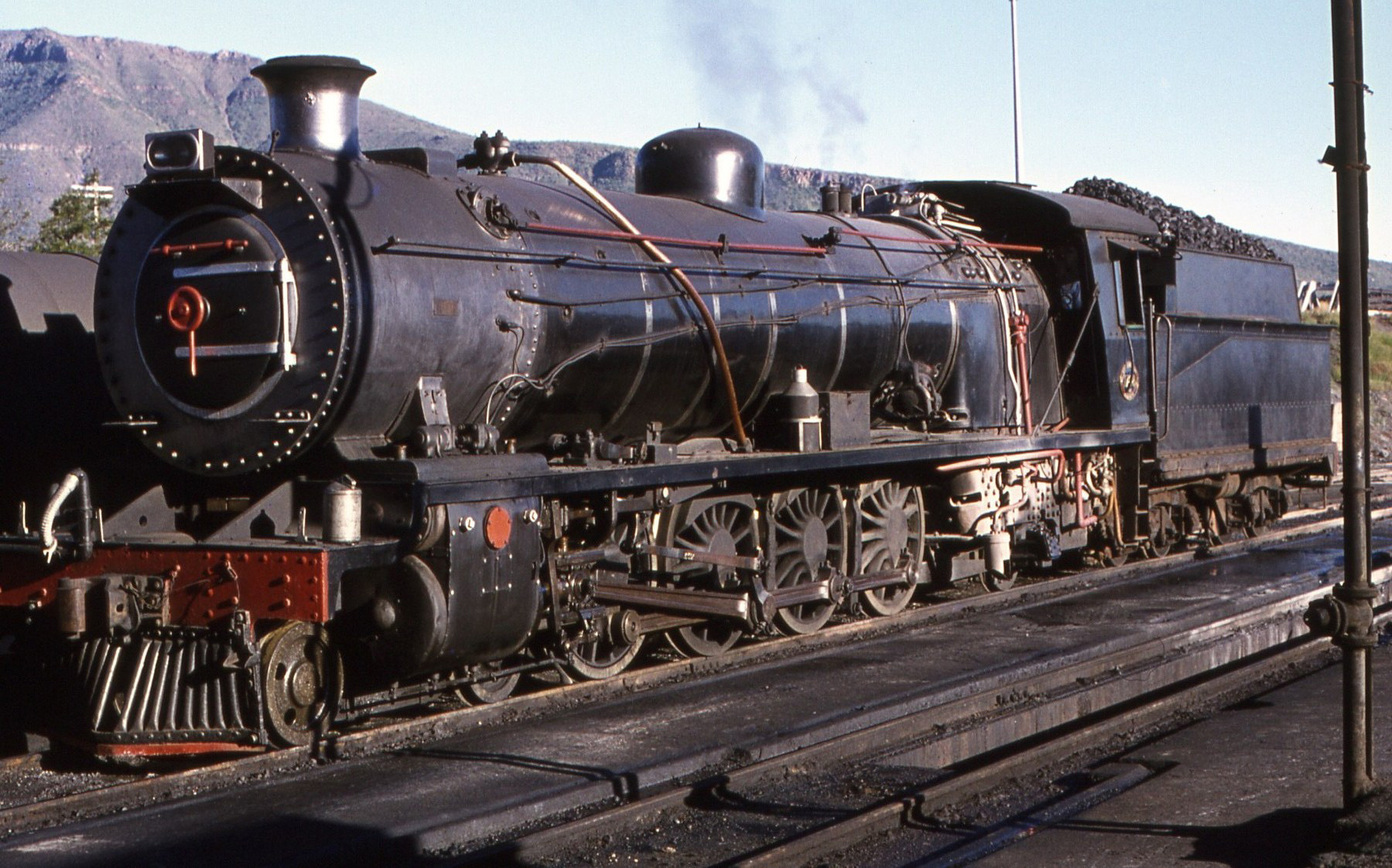
Class 15AR No. 1788 at Graaff-Reinet

- Between 1914 and 1925, the SAR placed 119 Class 15A locomotives in service, delivered in ten batches from three manufacturers. Of the whole Hendrie-designed Mountain family, this class proved to be his most useful and most numerous group of locomotives. Being wartime, initial production and delivery occurred sporadically. NBL delivered 68 between 1914 and 1921, BP delivered thirty in 1920 and 1921, and J.A. Maffei delivered the last 21 in 1925.
- Between 1918 and 1922, thirty Class 15B locomotives entered service. As a result of wartime disruption in Europe, they were ordered from MLW in Canada. They were built to the general specifications of the Class 15, but with bar frames and some typical North American features, and they were equipped with Belpaire fireboxes with combustion chambers.
- In 1925 and 1926, the SAR placed twelve Class 15C locomotives in service, built by Baldwin Locomotive Works and conforming to SAR requirements as far as practicable, but also incorporating the latest American railway engineering practices. They introduced several new features to the SAR, such as top feeds to the boiler, self-cleaning smokeboxes, Sellar's drifting valves and grease lubrication. Their fireboxes were equipped with siphon tubes to support the brick arch and to improve water circulation. The locomotive's size quickly earned it the nickname Big Bill.
- Between 1926 and 1930, 84 Class 15CA locomotives entered service. It was a redesigned version of the Class 15C, with the frames widened under the firebox using a bridle casting. Twenty-three were built by ALCO in 1926, four by Baldwin in 1929, ten by Società Italiana Ernesto Breda of Milan in Italy in 1929 and 47 by NBL between 1928 and 1930.

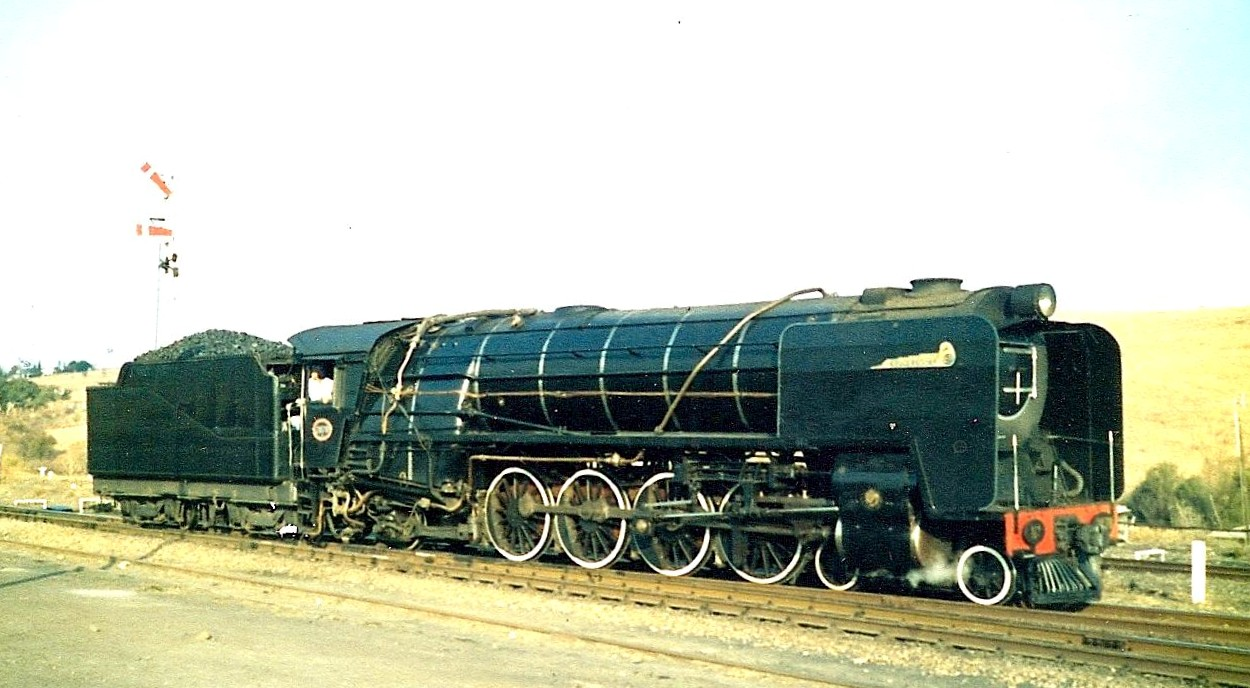
Class 15E at Magaliesburg

- Between 1935 and 1937, the SAR placed 44 Class 15E locomotives in service. It was a refinement of the Class 15C and Class 15CA and was designed by CME A.G. Watson, incorporating many of his improvements including a vastly enlarged Watson Standard boiler and a Watson cab with a sloping front. Twenty were built by Robert Stephenson & Hawthorns (RSH) in 1935, sixteen by Henschel in 1936, and eight by Berliner Maschinenbau in 1937. The locomotives had poppet valve gear and were fast, although some trouble was initially experienced with the gear in the reverse position.
- Between 1938 and 1946, 255 Class 15F locomotives were placed in service, making it the most numerous steam locomotive class in SAR service. It was similar to the Class 15E with a Watson Standard No. 3B boiler and a Watson cab, but with Walschaerts valve gear. It was designed by CME W.A.J Day and built in four batches in the eight years spanning World War II. In 1938, seven were built by Berliner, fourteen by Henschel and 44 by North British Locomotive Company. Locomotive-building was interrupted by the war, but because of a critical motive power shortage manufacturing was resumed even before hostilities had ceased. In 1944, production started with thirty locomotives by Beyer, Peacock & Company, followed by sixty by NBL in 1945. The final batch of 100 was built by NBL in 1946 and 1947. The pre-war Class 15Fs were hand-stoked and were delivered without smoke deflectors, while the post-war locomotives were built with mechanical stokers, smoke deflectors and vacuum brakes on the coupled wheels as well as on the tenders.

Five Class 19 variants were introduced by the SAR between 1928 and 1937.

- In 1928, the SAR placed four Class 19 locomotives in service. It was a lighter branch-line version of the classes 15C and 15CA mainline locomotives, built to the basic design of test engineer M.M. Loubser as requested by CME Colonel F.R. Collins DSO. Built on bar frames by Berliner in Germany, they were superheated and used Walschaerts valve gear.

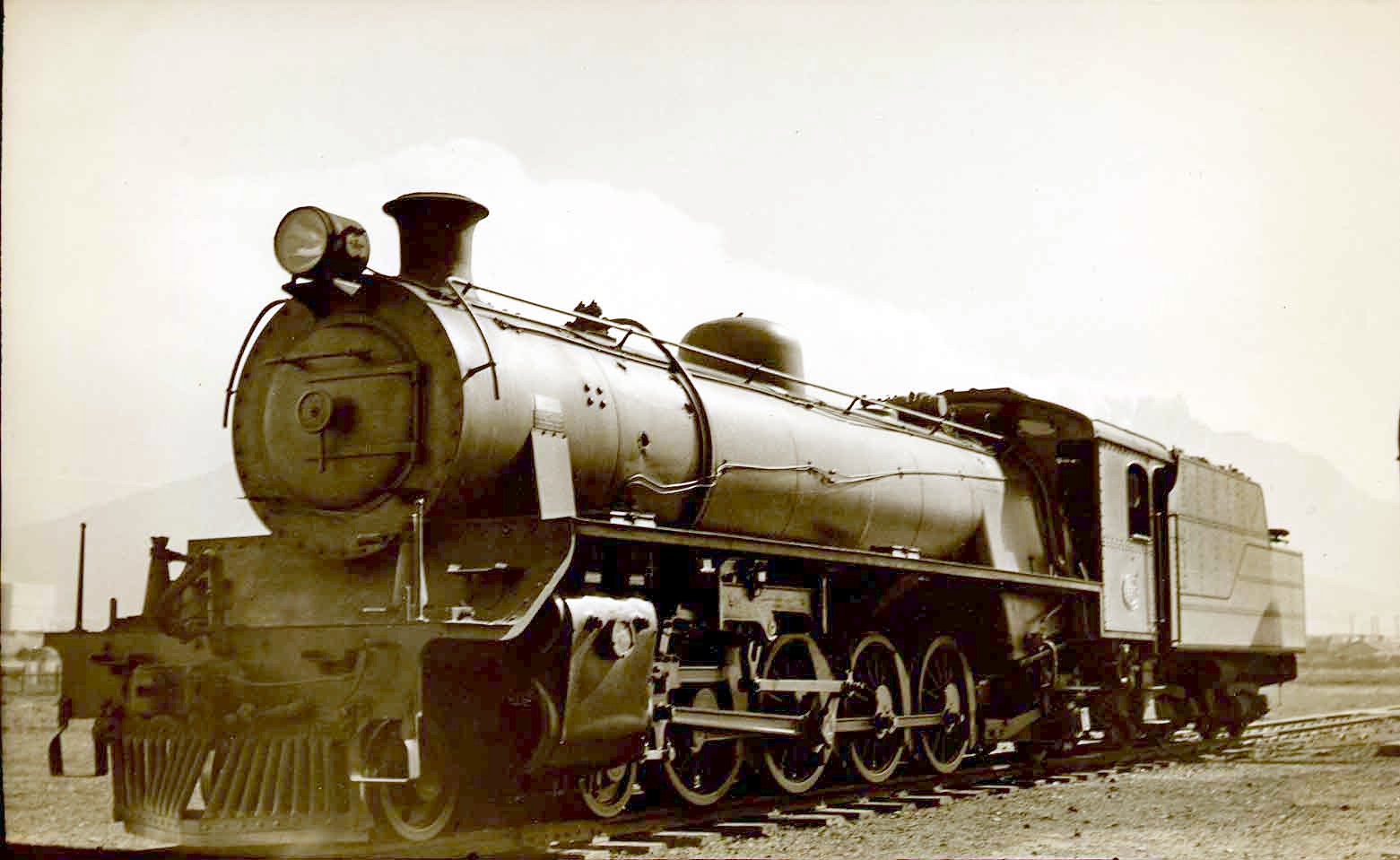
Class 19A at Paardeneiland, c. 1940

- In 1929, 36 Class 19A locomotives entered service. It was a later model of the Class 19, but redesigned by Collins to achieve a lighter axle loading by reducing the coupled wheel diameter from 54 to 51 inches (1,370 to 1,300 millimetres), reducing the cylinder diameter from 21 to 19.5 inches (533 to 495 millimetres) and by using a smaller boiler. They were built by Swiss Locomotive & Machine Works (SLM).
- In 1930, fourteen Class 19B locomotives entered service. Built in Germany by Berliner, it was virtually identical to the Class 19 apart from the wheelbase of the front bogie, which had been increased from 6 feet 2 inches (1,880 millimetres) to 6 feet 4 inches (1,930 millimetres) to improve the clearance between the cylinders and the bogie wheels.
- Fifty Class 19C locomotives entered service in 1935, built by NBL to the design of the Class 19B, but with rotary cam poppet valve gear and Watson Standard No. 1A boilers. It had a larger superheater than the Class 19B and was equipped with a Watson cab with a sloping front that, like the Watson Standard boiler, was to become standard on later SAR steam locomotive classes. In a break with prior custom, the ash pan and running boards were affixed to the locomotive frame instead of to the boiler to facilitate easier removal of the boiler for repairs.
- Between 1937 and 1949, 235 Class 19D locomotives entered service, with the final development of the Class 19 series of locomotives having been done in 1937 by CME W.A.J. Day. The Class 19D, nicknamed Dolly, was very similar to its predecessor Class 19C, but with piston valves and Walschaerts valve gear instead of RC poppet gear. The locomotives were built in batches by several locomotive manufacturers. In 1937 and 1938, sixty were built by Friedrich Krupp AG and another sixty by the Borsig Lokomotiv Werke. In 1938, Škoda Works in Czechoslovakia built fifteen before locomotive-building was interrupted by the Second World War. In 1947, fifty were built by Robert Stephenson & Hawthorns, and the final batch of fifty was delivered by NBL in 1949. The NBL locomotives were delivered with Type MX Torpedo tenders with cylindrical water tanks that ran on three-axle Buckeye bogies.

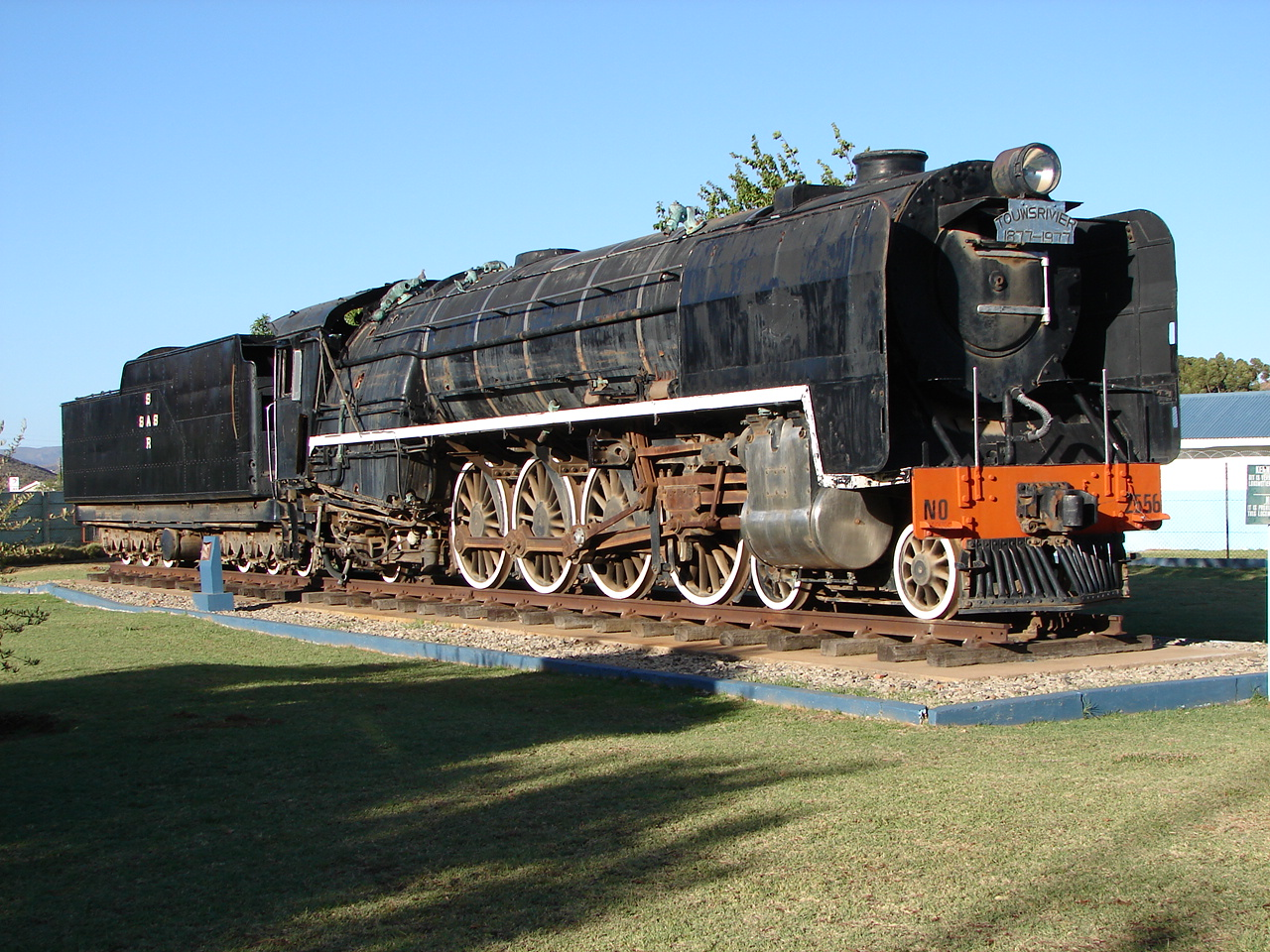
Class 23 No. 2556 at Touws River

In 1938 and 1939, the SAR placed 136 Class 23 locomotives in service, its last and largest Mountain locomotive. Designed by Day, they were intended as a general utility locomotive capable of operating on 80 pounds per yard (40 kilograms per metre) rail. They were built in two batches by Berliner Maschinenbau and Henschel & Son in Germany. The original order in 1938 was for twenty locomotives, of which Berliner built seven and Henschel thirteen. However, the urgency brought about by the rapidly deteriorating political climate in Europe at the time led to an additional 116 locomotives being ordered even before the first batch could be delivered and tested. Of these, Henschel built 85 and Berliner 31. The last locomotive of this second order was delivered in August 1939, just one month before the outbreak of the Second World War. Since they were intended for working in the arid Karoo, their very large tenders with a high water capacity rode on six-wheeled bogies.

=== Spain ===
Spain had more than 200 Mountain locomotives, known as the 241 type, in five classes.

The first type to be introduced, although earlier by only a few weeks, was the NORTE 4000 class, 4001–4047 in 1925 and 4049–4066 later. This was a huge four-cylinder compound machine with a 163.5 tonnes (160.9 long tons; 180.2 short tons) working order weight and 1,750 mm (5 ft 9 in) coupled wheels, a diameter that was believed to be ideal for passenger locomotives in the mountainous Peninsula. It performed very well on heavy express trains from Madrid to the French border in Irun. Although built in Spain, the type was of German design.

Compañía de los Ferrocarriles de Madrid a Zaragoza y Alicante (MZA) commissioned the 1700 type (1701–1795), built by La Maquinista Terrestre y Marítima (MTM) in Barcelona. It was a rude two-cylinder simple expansion locomotive, also with 1,750 mm (5 ft 9 in) coupled wheels and slightly lighter than its NORTE counterpart, with the first ones of 1925 at 159.5 tonnes and the last ones of 1930 at 163.44 tonnes.

A controversy arose in Spain between the defenders of these two types. The 4000 was slightly more powerful, but the simplicity and reliability of the Spanish-designed 1700 was preferred.

The MZA commissioned an enhanced 1700 type, designed with a streamlined casing á la mode and designated the 1800 type. The Spanish Civil War interrupted construction and the ten machines were only completed after the war ended in 1939. Although well-designed and good performers in theory, they lacked the advantages of streamlined casing and especially suffered from problems associated with the high-pressure boiler, which needed specially designed lubricators that were not available in impoverished postwar Spain.

The NORTE launched the 4648 just before RENFE was established in 1941. It was an enhanced 4600 type with new designed cylinders after the proposals of André Chapelon. The locomotive was slightly more powerful than her sisters and RENFE commissioned 28 more to be built between 1946 and 1948. The increased capacity of the new machines never reached its full potential, however, due to the lack of maintenance typical of post-war Spain.

In 1944, RENFE commissioned the 2700 type to run on former MZA lines. The type used the high-capacity boiler designed for the 2-10-2 Santa Fe type of 1942. They were very powerful machines with weights exceeding 204 tonnes and with 1,750 mm (5 ft 9 in) coupled wheels. They performed well and were appreciated by the crews who called them Bonitas (prettys). A coal-fired and stoker-equipped design, they were converted to oil-firing in the 1950s. Construction ceased in 1952, with 57 locomotives having been built. The last one was retired in 1973. One is preserved (241-2238F) in Móra la Nova (Tarragona, Catalonia, Spain) for the APPFI enthusiast association that intends to restore it to running order.

=== United Kingdom ===
The United Kingdom's entire population of Mountain locomotives consists of Hercules and Samson, the two 15 in (381 mm) gauge 4-8-2 locomotives of the 13 1/2-mile (21.7-kilometre) Romney, Hythe & Dymchurch Railway in Kent, England. The locomotives were built by Davey Paxman in 1927.

The Southern Railway considered using 4-8-2s for express trains before changing to the 2-8-2 and eventually 4-6-2 design, leading to the Bulleid pacifics. The London and North Eastern Railway had designs for 4-8-2s, but during WWII the British government forbid the development of express passenger locomotives, so the plans were dropped. Following the LNER chief mechanical engineer Sir Nigel Gresley’s death from illness in 1941, neither Edward Thompson nor Arthur Peppercorn resumed the 4-8-2 project, and after the United Kingdom nationalized private railway companies into British Railways in 1948, only 4-6-2s were pursued as express locomotives with the BR Standard Class 6 and 7 (though they were classified as mixed-traffic), as well as rebuilt versions of the aforementioned 4-6-2s of Bulleid’s design, which would last until dieselization.

=== United States ===
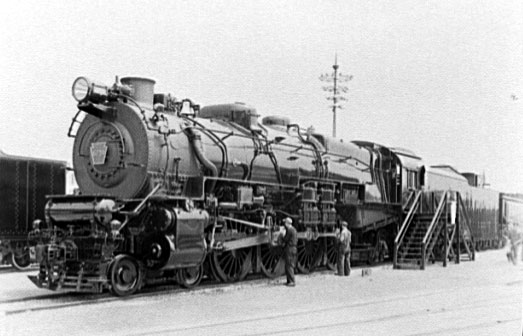
PRR Class M1

The 4-8-2 was most popular on the North American continent. When the 4-6-2 Pacific fleets were becoming overburdened as passenger trains grew in length and weight, the first North American 4-8-2 locomotives were built by the American Locomotive Company (ALCO) for the Chesapeake and Ohio Railway (C&O) in 1911. It is possible that the "Mountain" name was originated by C&O, after the Allegheny Mountains where their first 4-8-2 locomotives were built to work. ALCO combined the traction of the eight-coupled 2-8-2 Mikado with the excellent tracking qualities of the Pacific's four-wheel leading truck. Although C&O intended their new Mountains for passenger service, the type also proved ideal for the new, faster freight services that railroads in the United States were introducing. Many 4-8-2 locomotives were therefore built for dual service.

About 2,200 Mountain type locomotives were built for 41 American railroads. With 600 4-8-2 locomotives, the largest user in the United States was the New York Central Railroad (NYC), but they used the name, "Mohawk" rather than "Mountain".

Other large users in the United States were the Pennsylvania Railroad with 301 Class M1, Class M1a and Class M1b locomotives that were used mostly for fast freight service, the Florida East Coast with ninety passenger locomotives, the New York, New Haven and Hartford Railroad with seventy, and the Southern Railway with fifty-eight.

The heaviest 4-8-2s in the world were twenty-three St. Louis–San Francisco Railway (Frisco) 4400 class locomotives, built by the railroad between 1939 and 1945, using boilers from older 2-10-2 locomotives, riding cast-steel frames, and weighing over 449,000 pounds (204 t). These were a follow-up to the Frisco's 4300 class, similarly rebuilt at their Springfield, Missouri shops with some parts from 2-10-2s and new cast frames, but with new 250 psi (1,700 kPa) boilers.

The most powerful 4-8-2s in the world were twenty 2600 class locomotives (Nos. 2600-2619) owned by the Illinois Central Railroad; they were equipped with 275 psi (1,900 kPa) boilers, and they were able to produce a tractive effort of 78,450 lbf (349.0 kN). The 2600s were constructed in the early 1940s at the Illinois Central's shops in Paducah, Kentucky, and they were among 146 4-8-2 locomotives the railroad rostered.

The Southern Pacific Railroad ordered seventy-five MT-class 4-8-2s from ALCO for both freight and passenger service.

One notable example is Frisco No. 1522, one of thirty T-54 class Mountains built by Baldwin in 1926. It became the only North American 4-8-2 to have regularly pulled multiple mainline excursion trains. It pulled excursions from 1988 to 2002, but rising insurance rates and a flue sheet cracked beyond repair forced it back into retirement. As of 2026, No. 1522 is on static display at the National Museum of Transportation in St Louis.

== Original buyers ==
North American 4-8-2 locomotive operators
Railroad (Quantity, nickname)	Class	Road numbers	Builder	Build year	Notes
Great Northern Railway (43 "Mountains")	P-1	1750–1764	Lima	1914	All rebuilt into Q-2 2-10-2s in 1928, all scrapped
Great Northern Railway (43 "Mountains")	P-2	2500–2527	Baldwin	1923	2507 and 2523 preserved, remainder scrapped
New York Central Railroad (600 "Mohawks")	L-2d	2925-2949	Alco	1929	2933 preserved at the National Museum of Transportation in St Louis, Missouri, remainder scrapped
New York Central Railroad (600 "Mohawks")	L-3a	3000-3034	Alco	1940	3001 preserved at the National New York Central Railroad Museum in Elkhart, Indiana, remainder scrapped
New York Central Railroad (600 "Mohawks")	L-3b	3035–3049	Alco	1940	All scrapped
New York Central Railroad (600 "Mohawks")	L-3c	3050–3064	Alco	1940	All scrapped
New York Central Railroad (600 "Mohawks")	L-4a	3100–3124	Lima	1942	All scrapped
New York Central Railroad (600 "Mohawks")	L-4b	3125–3149	Lima	1942	All scrapped
Pennsylvania Railroad (301 "Mountains")	M1	4700, 6800-6999	PRR Altoona Works, Baldwin, Lima	1923-1926	All scrapped
Pennsylvania Railroad (301 "Mountains")	M1a	6700-6799	PRR Altoona Works, Baldwin, Lima	1930	38 rebuilt into "M1b"s. 6755 preserved in Strasburg, Pennsylvania, remainder scrapped
Southern Pacific (83 "Mountains")	Mt-1	4300-4327	Alco Schenectady	1923–1924	Equipped with skyline casings during/after 1939 Mt-2's were built for the EP&SW All scrapped
Southern Pacific (83 "Mountains")	Mt-2	4385-4390	Alco Brooks	1924	Equipped with skyline casings during/after 1939 Mt-2's were built for the EP&SW All scrapped
Southern Pacific (83 "Mountains")	Mt-3	4328-4345	SP Sacramento	1925–1926	Equipped with skyline casings during/after 1939 Mt-2's were built for the EP&SW All scrapped
Southern Pacific (83 "Mountains")	Mt-4	4346-4366	SP Sacramento	1926–1929	Equipped with skyline casings during/after 1939 Mt-2's were built for the EP&SW All scrapped
Southern Pacific (83 "Mountains")	Mt-5	4367-4376	SP Sacramento	1929–1930	Equipped with skyline casings during/after 1939 Mt-2's were built for the EP&SW All scrapped

== Preservation by country ==
Some of the more notable preserved Mountains worldwide are listed here by country of origin.

United States of America

- Grand Trunk Western 6039: On display at Steamtown National Historic Site in Scranton, Pennsylvania.
- Great Northern 2507: On display at the Wishram depot in Wishram, Washington.
- Great Northern 2523: On display at the Kandiyohi County Historical Society in Willmar, Minnesota.
- Illinois Central 2500: On display at the Age of Steam Memorial in Fairview Park in Centralia, Illinois.
- Illinois Central 2542: On display at the McComb Railroad Museum in McComb, Mississippi.
- New York Central 2933: On display at the National Museum of Transportation in Kirkwood, Missouri.
- New York Central 3001: Undergoing restoration to operating condition at the Fort Wayne Railroad Historical Society in New Haven, Indiana. It is the largest surviving New York Central steam locomotive.
- Pennsylvania Railroad 6755: On display at the Railroad Museum of Pennsylvania in Strasburg, Pennsylvania.
- St. Louis–San Francisco 1501: On display at Schuman Park in Rolla, Missouri.
- St. Louis–San Francisco 1519: On display at the Railroad Museum of Oklahoma in Enid, Oklahoma.
- St. Louis–San Francisco 1522: On display at Museum of Transportation in Kirkwood, Missouri. Restored in 1988 and operated in excursion service until 2002.
- St. Louis–San Francisco 1526: On display at the Museum of the Great Plains in Lawton, Oklahoma.
- St. Louis–San Francisco 1527: On display at Langan Park in Mobile, Alabama.
- St. Louis–San Francisco 1529: On display at Frisco Park in Amory, Mississippi.
