= Southern Pacific class MT-5 =

Class of American 4-8-2 locomotives

Southern Pacific Class Mt-5
Type and origin
- Power type: Steam
- Builder: Southern Pacific's Sacramento Shops
- Build date: 1929-1930
- Total produced: 10
Specifications
- Configuration
  - Whyte: 4-8-2
- Driver dia.: 73 in (1,854.2 mm)
- Wheelbase
  - Engine: 43 ft
- Axle load: 61,800 lb (28,000 kg)
- Fuel type: oil
- Boiler pressure: 210 psi (1.45 MPa)
- Valve gear: Walschaerts
- Valve type: Piston
Performance figures
- Tractive effort: 57,511 lbf (255.82 kN)
Career
- Operators: Southern Pacific Company
- Class: MT-5
- Numbers: 4367-4376
- Locale: California
- Retired: 1953-1958
- Preserved: 0
- Disposition: All scrapped

The Southern Pacific Class Mt-5 is a class of 4-8-2 Mountain steam locomotives built between 1929 and 1930 by the Southern Pacific's own Sacramento shops. There were 10 locomotives built in the class. They were retired between 1953 and 1958. None survived into preservation.
