= St. Louis–San Francisco 1522 =

Preserved American 4-8-2 locomotive

St. Louis–San Francisco Railway 1522
- Frisco No. 1522 on static display at the National Museum of Transportation outside of St. Louis, Missouri
Type and origin
- Power type: Steam
- Builder: Baldwin Locomotive Works
- Serial number: 59134
- Build date: May 1926
Specifications
- Configuration
  - Whyte: 4-8-2
- Gauge: 4 ft 8 1/2 in (1,435 mm)
- Driver dia.: 69 in (1.75 m)
- Adhesive weight: 250,500 pounds (113.6 t)
- Loco weight: 355,000 pounds (161.0 t)
- Tender weight: 233,120 pounds (105.7 t)
- Fuel type: Oil
- Boiler pressure: 200 psi (1.38 MPa)
- Cylinders: Two, outside
- Cylinder size: 28×28 in (711×711 mm)
- Valve gear: Walschaerts
- Valve type: Piston valves
- Loco brake: Air
- Train brakes: Air
- Couplers: Knuckle
Performance figures
- Power output: 3,600 hp (2,700 kW)
- Tractive effort: 54,085 lbf (240.58 kN); 62,835 lbf (279.50 kN) with booster
- Factor of adh.: 4.44
Career
- Operators: St. Louis-San Francisco Railway; St. Louis Steam Train Association
- Class: T-54
- Number in class: 30
- Numbers: SLSF 1522
- Retired: 1951 (revenue service); September 29, 2002 (excursion service)
- Preserved: May 1959
- Restored: July 16, 1987
- Current owner: National Museum of Transportation (St. Louis, Missouri)
- Disposition: On static display

St. Louis–San Francisco Railway 1522 is a preserved T-54 class 4-8-2 "Mountain" type steam locomotive built in May 1926 by the Baldwin Locomotive Works (BLW) for the St. Louis–San Francisco Railway (SLSF), also known as the "Frisco". It, along with her sisters, was built to handle Frisco's heavier passenger trains through the hilly Ozark regions. It was retired by the Frisco in 1951 and in May 1959 donated to the National Museum of Transportation in St. Louis, Missouri, where it is currently on display. It was restored to operating condition in the spring of 1988 and operated in excursion service until the fall of 2002 when it was placed back into retirement at the museum. As of 2026, No. 1522 is on static display at the National Museum of Transportation in St. Louis, Missouri. Five other examples of Frisco Mountain-type locomotives are preserved today throughout the United States.

== History ==
=== Revenue service ===
St. Louis–San Francisco 1522 was built in May 1926 as part of the third order of the 1500 class (referred to in one source as T-54) "Mountain" type locomotives for the St. Louis-San Francisco Railway. Purchased for $70,000, originally built as a coal burner it was converted to burn oil shortly after it was purchased by the Frisco. The locomotive was built to handle heavy passenger and freight services along the Frisco Railway's Eastern and Western divisions, and had a 200 PSI boiler pressure, 69-inch drivers, 54,085 lbs. of tractive effort, and a top speed of 70 mph. Throughout its career, No. 1522, along with the other 1500s, was found to be well-liked by engine crews, dispatchers, and the motive power department. As they were true general-purpose locomotives, they were well suited for use in hotshot freight service, fast passenger service, or even local runs.

In the decade following the start of World War II in 1939 No. 1522 and 15 other 1500-class locomotives were upgraded with booster engines, boiler pressure increased to 210 psi, and 69 1/2-inch drivers, increasing their tractive force to 56,380 lbs (65,550 lbs. with the booster) and their top speed to 90 mph. At the same time, the Frisco Railway was experimenting with diesel locomotives and began rapid conversion to diesel during the late 1940s and early 1950s. All scheduled steam operations ended on the Frisco in February 1952, and reserve steam operations ended in 1956.

=== First retirement ===
No. 1522 was originally retired in 1951 after the Frisco ended all steam operations. In May 1959, the locomotive was selected for preservation and donated to the Museum of Transportation of St. Louis, Missouri where it would sit for 26 years.

=== First restoration and excursion career ===
No. 1522 hauling an excursion on the Poplar Street Wye on July 1, 1999

US states visited by No. 1522 in excursion service

In September 1985, when the newly formed non-profit organization, the St. Louis Steam Train Association, selected No. 1522 for restoration to operational condition. The restoration work includes installing new flues, superheaters, and staybolts. The main axle boxes were replaced, and the pilot and trailing trucks were rebuilt. On July 16, 1987, No. 1522 was steamed up for the first in 36 years. The restoration work was completed and by April 1988, the No. 1522 began a second career in excursion service which lasted until retirement again in late 2002. This locomotive did a variety of excursions and went through an additional overhaul.

No. 1522 made a series of break in runs during July and August 1988 on the Wisconsin Central Railroad. Her first excursion was a Saturday and Sunday round trip between River Grove, IL to Fond du Lac, WI, on the Wisconsin Central. In October that year, No. 1522 made its inaugural run to Decatur, Illinois, and in May 1989, the locomotive made a run to Moberly, Missouri. During the NRHS annual convention in June 1990, No. 1522 pulled a 22-car excursion over Rolla Hill and was on display at St. Louis Union Station alongside Cotton Belt 819, Norfolk and Western 1218, and Union Pacific 844. No. 1522 ran a double-header excursion with No. 844 after the convention was completed.

On June 18, 1994, No. 1522 pulled the Peach Blossom Special excursion out of St. Louis on the Burlington Northern's (BN) ex-SLSF rails with stops at Springfield, Missouri that day and Memphis, Tennessee on the 19th, before arriving in Birmingham, Alabama on the 20th. On the 21st, Norfolk and Western 611 joined in with No. 1522 to complete the excursion's final leg of the journey to Atlanta, Georgia on Norfolk Southern (NS) rails for the Atlanta Chapter NRHS convention's Steam'n Thru Georgia event. Upon its stay in Atlanta, No. 1522 pulled the convention's June 23 Nancy Hanks Special excursion on former Central of Georgia (CG) rails from Atlanta to Macon, where No. 611 joined in for the return trip with the excursion renamed the Ponce de Leon Route Special since the train is switching onto ex-Southern Railway (SOU) rails, which is where the Ponce de Leon passenger train used to run. On June 26, Nos. 1522 and 611 concluded the convention with the Royal Palm Route Special excursion from Atlanta to Chattanooga. At Rome, Georgia, the excursion consist was split up with the two steam locomotives pulling 11 of the one-way excursion cars up to Chattanooga and two NS diesels pulling 11 round-trip excursion cars back to Atlanta. (Note: Southern Railway 4501 was originally going to attend the event but was sidelined by heavy maintenance at the Tennessee Valley Railroad Museum (TVRM).) After the NRHS event, the next day, No. 1522 departed Chattanooga with a short freight train to set out at Birmingham, where the locomotive would switch over to BN rails for the return journey back to St. Louis, arriving there on June 29. In June of the following year, the locomotive was the special guest of the annual haymarket heyday and did several excursions between Omaha and Lincoln, Nebraska.

No. 1522 derailed on a wye in North St. Louis, Missouri on May 17, 1999, while on a test run following an 18-month overhaul. A rail overturned under the fireman's side as the locomotive was moving onto the wye, causing extensive damage to the running gear. The damage was repaired and the locomotive returned to service a few months later with help from the Tennessee Valley Railroad Museum (TVRM) in Chattanooga, Tennessee. In June 2001, No. 1522 was invited to pull the Burlington Northern Santa Fe (BNSF) annual employee appreciation special which included a historic tour through the state of Texas. No. 1522 was also invited to pull several excursions for the 2001 NRHS annual convention held that year in St. Louis.

=== Second retirement ===
In 2002, it was announced that the No. 1522 was to be put back into retirement as a result of increased insurance rates and flue failures. New FRA regulations required that an active steam locomotive must be inspected and re-tubed every 15 years (old boiler flues must be replaced with new ones), which proved to be too expensive for the SLSTA. Between September 28 and 29 of that year, No. 1522 ran farewell excursions, and immediately afterwards, it was put back into retirement.

As of 2025, Frisco 1522 is still a major exhibit at the National Museum of Transportation, and it remains the only 4-8-2 type locomotive in the United States to have an excursion career. Due to its poor mechanical condition, it will likely never run under its own power again. Some people have stated that while the locomotive could technically be restored, it is not financially feasible, as its original flue sheet is badly cracked, which would require fabrication of a replacement.

SLSF Frisco 1500/T-54 Class 4-8-2 Locomotives
Locomotive numbers	Builder	Year built	Year Scrapped and Total Preserved
1500-1529 (total ; 30)	Baldwin Locomotive Works	1923-1926	Scrapped in the 1950s but six locomotives preserved (locomotives number 1501, 1519, 1522, 1526, 1527, 1529): 1501 is preserved in Rolla, Missouri; 1519 is preserved in Enid,Oklahoma; 1522 is preserved in Saint Louis Missouri; 1526 is preserved in Lawton, Oklahoma; 1527 is preserved in Mobile, Alabama; 1529 is preserved in Amory, Mississippi
