= Illinois Central 2300, 2400, 2500 and 2600 Classes =

Steam locomotives built in 1923 to 1926

The Illinois Central 2300, 2400, 2500 and 2600 Classes were a series of 4-8-2 "Mountain" type steam locomotives that were manufactured by various builders, with the 2400 class being built by the American Locomotive Company (ALCO) and the Lima Locomotive Works (LLW), and the 2300, 2500 and 2600 class being built by the Illinois Central Railroad's Paducah, Kentucky shops, with the 2500s being rebuilds from their 2900 class 2-10-2 "Santa Fe" or "Central" type locomotives.

== 2400 Class ==
Illinois Central 2400 and 2300 Classes
Type and origin
- Power type: Steam
- Builder: American Locomotive Company (ALCO); Lima Locomotive Works (LLW)
- Build date: 1923, 1925–1926
- Total produced: 60
- Rebuilder: Illinois Central’s Paducah, Kentucky shops
- Rebuild date: March 1944–July 1945
- Number rebuilt: 11
Specifications
- Configuration
  - Whyte: 4-8-2
  - UIC: 2’D1’
- Gauge: 4 ft 8 1/2 in (1,435 mm)
- Fuel type: Coal
- Cylinders: Two, outside
- Valve gear: Walschaerts
- Valve type: Piston valves
- Loco brake: Air
- Train brakes: Air
- Couplers: Knuckle
Career
- Operators: Illinois Central Railroad
- Class: 2400, 2415, 2300, 2350
- Numbers: 2400–2459, 2300–2307, 2350–2352
- Disposition: All scrapped

=== Revenue service and design ===
The Illinois Central 2400 Class had been built in three batches, the first batch of fifteen locomotives numbered 2400 through 2414, being built by the American Locomotive Company (ALCO) in 1923, the second batch of twenty-five locomotives numbered 2415 through 2439, being built by Lima Locomotive Works (LLW) in 1925, and the third batch of twenty locomotives numbered 2440 through 2459, being built by ALCO in 1926.

The firebox heating surface included 48.3 sq ft (6,960 sq in; 4.49 m^{2}) of arch tubes, and having the boiler pressure setting was 200 psi (1,400 kPa; 1.4 MPa; 14 bar). Meanwhile nos. 2415 through 2459 had the arch tubes were replaced by 115.5 sq ft (16,630 sq in; 10.73 m^{2}) from three thermic syphons, and having boiler pressures be set at 230 psi (1,600 kPa; 1.6 MPa; 16 bar) or 245 psi (1,690 kPa; 1.69 MPa; 16.9 bar), generating tractive efforts of 61,824 lbf (275.01 kN; 275,010 N) and 65,856 lbf (292.94 kN; 292,940 N) and showing factors of adhesion of 4.12 and 3.87.

=== 2300 Class ===
Between March 1944 and July 1945, eleven locomotives were rebuilt by the Illinois Central Railroad themselves at their own Paducah, Kentucky shops as at the time, buying newer locomotives weren't possible, the rebuilds involved replacing the old boilers with new ones as a response for needing more locomotives to haul its passenger trains. These 11 locomotive would be known as the 2300 class, and 2350 class. The Illinois Central 2300 Class had been built in two batches, with the first eight locomotives built in March 1944 and numbered as 2300 through 2307, and the remaining three locomotives built in July 1945 and numbered 2350, 2351, and 2352, the entire class had been rebuilds from 11 locomotives of the 2400 class.

All eleven locomotives were equipped with 62 sq ft (8,900 sq in; 5.8 m^{2}) of circulators in the firebox and 18.5 sq ft (2,660 sq in; 1.72 m^{2}) in a single thermic syphon in the combustion chamber.

Illinois Central retired all eleven locomotives from the roster and had all eleven locomotives scrapped, with nos. 2350 and 2351 were scrapped by the Illinois Central in October 1956, no. 2352 was scrapped by the Illinois Central in January 1957 and nos. 2300 through 2307 being scrapped by the Illinois Central in February 1960.

== 2500 Class ==
Illinois Central 2500 Class
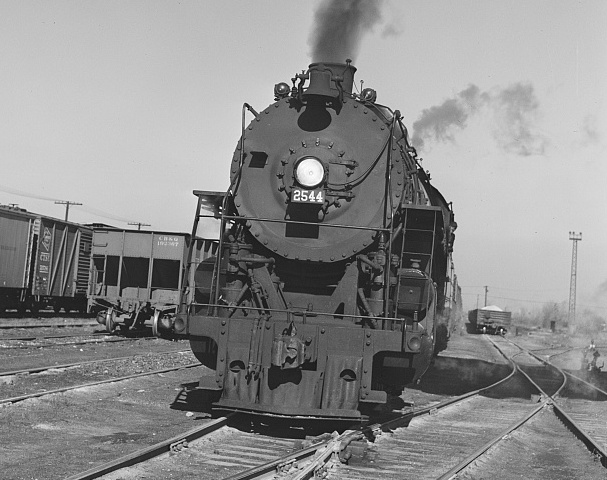
Type and origin
- Power type: Steam
- Builder: Lima Locomotive Works (LLW)
- Build date: 1921-1923
- Total produced: 125 (2900 class)
- Rebuilder: Illinois Central’s Paducah, Kentucky shops
- Rebuild date: 1937–1943
- Number rebuilt: 56
Specifications
- Configuration
  - Whyte: 4-8-2
  - UIC: 2’D1’
- Gauge: 4 ft 8 1/2 in (1,435 mm)
- Fuel type: Coal
- Fuel capacity: 26 t (26,000,000 g; 26,000 kg; 57,000 lb)
- Water cap.: 22,000 US gal (18,000 imp gal)
- Cylinders: Two, outside
- Valve gear: Walschaerts
- Valve type: Piston valves
- Loco brake: Air
- Train brakes: Air
- Couplers: Knuckle
Career
- Operators: Illinois Central Railroad
- Class: 2500
- Numbers: 2500–2554
- Preserved: 2500, 2542
- Disposition: Two preserved, remainder scrapped

=== Revenue service and design ===
Beginning in the mid-to-late-1930s, IC Paducah shops took the boilers of the 2900 class, reinforced them, and laid them on a new frame. The engine bed was comprised a single casting that included the cylinders and the air-pump reservoir. A total of fifty-six locomotives were rebuilt from 2900 class 2-10-2 "Santa Fe" or "Central" type steam locomotives between March 1937 and 1943, leaving only seventy locomotives left for the 2900 class.

No. 2500 was the only locomotive fitted with a Standard BK stoker; with the remaining members of the class, nos. 2501 to 2549 being fitted with a Duplex stoker. Originally pressed to 225 psi (1,550 kPa; 1.55 MPa; 15.5 bar) for the 2900 class, the class's boiler pressure was later reset to 240 psi (1,700 kPa; 1.7 MPa; 17 bar) when rebuilt.

Seventeen locomotives of the class originally used tenders carrying 16 tonnes (16,000,000 grams; 16,000 kilograms; 35,000 pounds) of coal and 12,000 US gallons (10,000 imperial gallons; 45,000 litres) of water; loaded weight was given as 208,600 pounds (94,600 kilograms; 94,600,000 grams; 94.6 tonnes). Twenty more had larger tenders that used 20 tonnes (20,000,000 grams; 20,000 kilograms; 44,000 pounds) and 15,000 US gallons (12,000 imperial gallons; 57,000 litres) of water.

== 2600 Class ==
Illinois Central 2600 Class
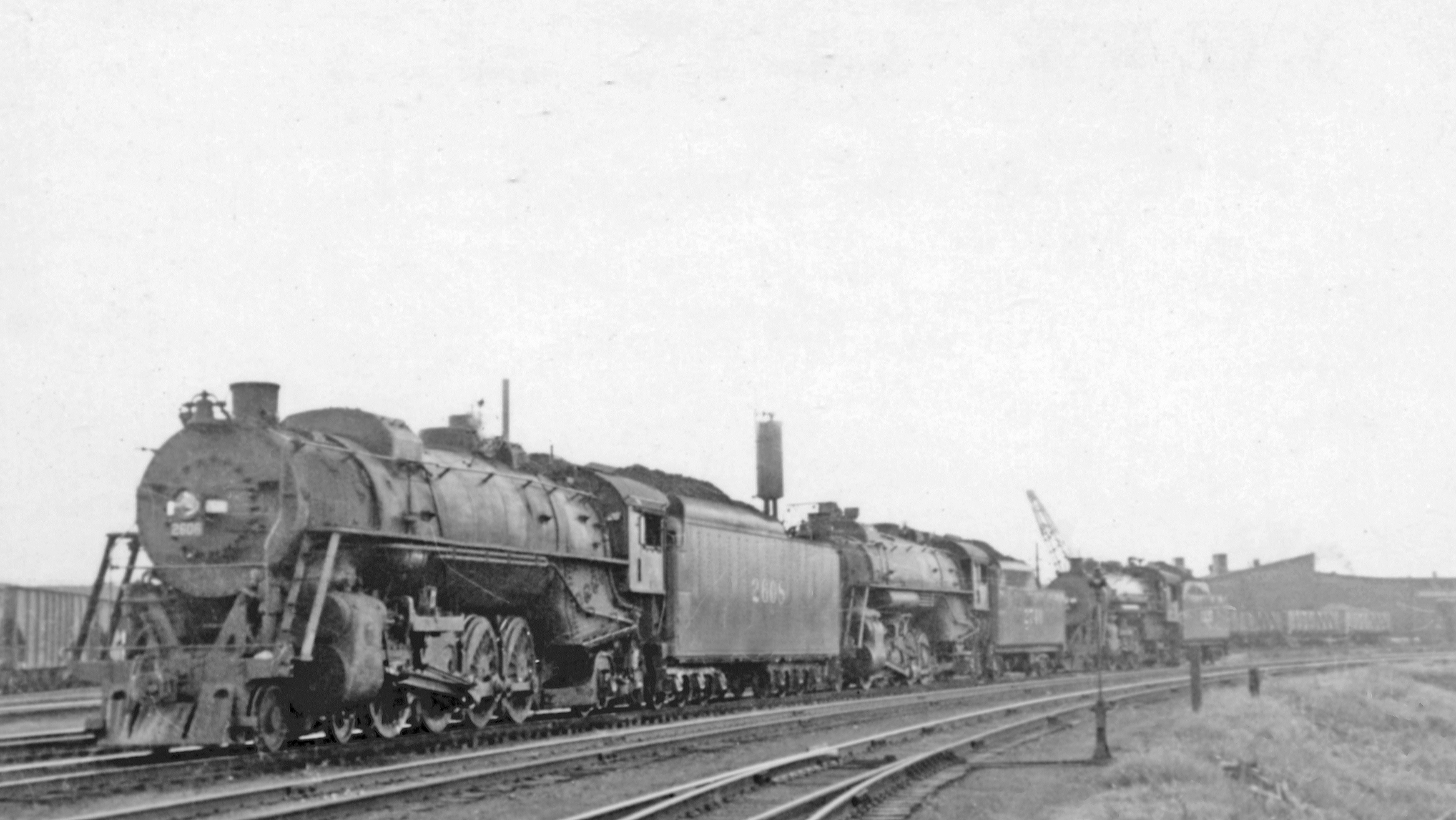
- Illinois Central #2608 at East St Louis, Illinois.
Type and origin
- Power type: Steam
- Builder: Illinois Central’s Paducah, Kentucky shops
- Build date: 1942–1943
- Total produced: 20
Specifications
- Configuration
  - Whyte: 4-8-2
  - UIC: 2’D1’
- Gauge: 4 ft 8 1/2 in (1,435 mm)
- Driver dia.: 70 in (1.778 m)
- Wheelbase: 92.34 ft (2,815 cm)
  - Engine: 42.25 ft (1,288 cm)
  - Drivers: 18.25 ft (556 cm)
- Adhesive weight: 293,880 lb (133,300 kg)
- Loco weight: 423,893 lb (192,275 kg)
- Tender weight: 370,500 lb (168,100 kg)
- Total weight: 794,393 lb (360,331 kg)
- Fuel type: Coal
- Fuel capacity: 26 t (57,000 lb)
- Water cap.: 22,000 imp gal (100,000 L; 26,000 US gal)
- Firebox
  - Grate area: 88.30 sq ft (8.203 m^{2})
- Boiler pressure: 275 psi (1,900 kPa)
- Heating surface
  - Firebox: 467 sq ft (43.4 m^{2})
- Superheater
  - Heating area: 1,619 sq ft (150 m^{2})
- Cylinders: Two, outside
- High-pressure cylinder: 28 in × 30 in (710 mm × 760 mm)
- Valve gear: Walschaerts
- Valve type: Piston valves
- Loco brake: Air
- Train brakes: Air
- Couplers: Knuckle
Performance figures
- Tractive effort: 78,540 lbf (349.36 kN)
- Factor of adh.: 3.74
Career
- Operators: Illinois Central Railroad
- Class: 2600
- Numbers: 2600–2619
- First run: 1942
- Last run: October 2, 1960
- Retired: 1960
- Disposition: All scrapped
- Two tenders got preserved, but both were scrapped in 2011

=== Revenue service and design ===
Between November 1942 and August 1943, a total of twenty locomotives were constructed by the Illinois Central Railroad (IC) at their own Paducah shops in Paducah, Kentucky. Construction involved fabricating new boilers and shipping in one-piece cast frames from General Steel Castings in Granite City, Illinois. The locomotives were also equipped with wheel tenders that held 20,000 US gallons (16,653 imp gal) of water and 26 tonnes (26,000 kg) of coal; a design feature that was rare on IC steam locomotives. The 2600 class was a step-up design of the IC 2500 class 4-8-2's, and their design was identical to the Baldwin-built 2800 series locomotives on the Wabash Railroad, but the 2600's were larger and heavier.

The 2600's were equipped with 70-inch (1,800 mm) diameter Boxpok and Baldwin spoke driving wheels, 28-by-30-inch (710 mm × 760 mm) cylinders—which were slightly smaller than those on the 2500's—and a boiler pressure of 275 psi (1,900 kPa). They were able to generate 78,450 lbf (349.0 kN) of tractive effort and travel at a top speed of 70 miles per hour (110 km/h), making the IC 2600's the most powerful 4-8-2 locomotives ever built. They also lacked new design features that were commonly used by other railroads, including feedwater heaters, boosters, and roller bearings, making the 2600 designs simplified.

=== Disposition ===
For unknown reasons, tenders from the 2600s remained in storage for some time, after their companion locomotives were scrapped.

=== Excursion service ===
On October 2, 1960, IC 2613 was refueled for the final time at Central City, Kentucky. It then pulled an excursion trip from Louisville, Kentucky to Dawson Springs, Kentucky and back, and this historically marked the very last run to be made by an Illinois Central steam engine.

== Preservation ==
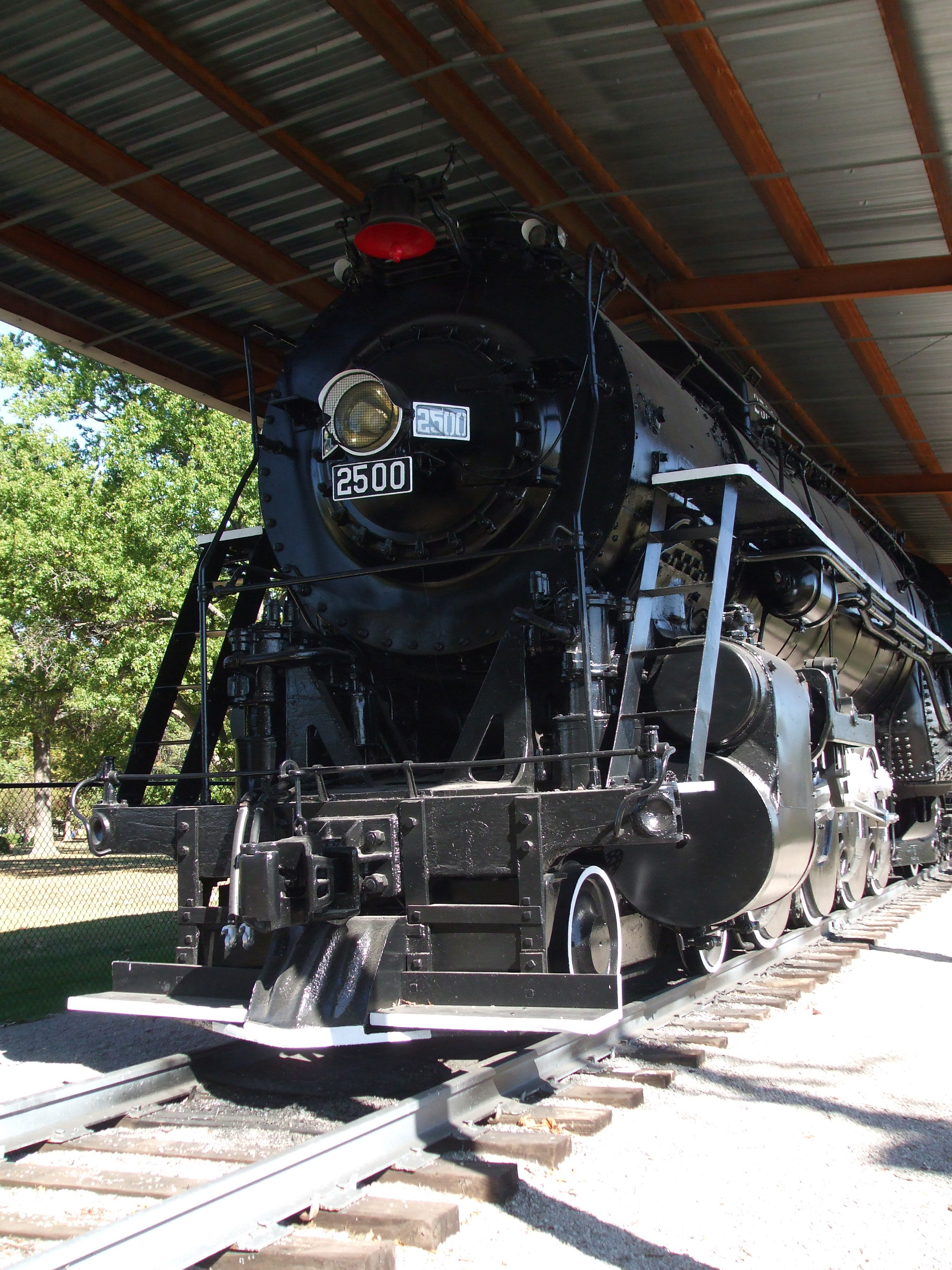
No. 2500 on static display at Fairview Park in Centralia, Illinois

Two locomotives of the 2500 class have been preserved:

No. 2500 was built in 1921 by Lima as 2-10-2 no. 2953 and is on static display at the Fairview Park in Centralia, Illinois.

No. 2542 was built in 1921 by Lima as 2-10-2 no. 2906 and is on static display at the former Illinois Central Railroad depot based in McComb, Mississippi.

A preservation attempt was made by the Kentucky Railway Museum (KRM) to obtain No. 2613 to display it. They negotiated directly with the IC, but the railroad refused to donate it and instead asked for the locomotive's scrap value. Since the KRM did not have enough money to meet the value at that time, No. 2613 wound up being scrapped.

=== Preserved tenders ===
Later, Chicago area railfan, Richard Jensen, acquired the tender of 4-8-2s Nos. 2612 and 2614, and he moved them to the Chicago, West Pullman and Southern Railroad (CWP&S) for storage. He had plans to use both tenders behind Chicago, Burlington and Quincy (CB&Q) locomotives Nos. 4963 and 5632, but as he fell into financial trouble in the 1970s, he fell behind on rent to store the tenders on the CWP&S.

In 1981, the CWP&S gave up on collecting rent from Jensen, and they acquired the tenders, along with York Southern Railroad 4-6-0 No. 1, as compensation. They subsequently sold the tenders and York Southern No. 1 at a sheriff auction to William Latham of Rockford, Illinois. Latham had planned to create a small railroad museum with the locomotive and two tenders, but this plan fell through. York Southern No. 1 was later purchased by the Monticello Railway Museum in June 2000.

== Bibliography ==
- Kean, Randolph (1973). The Railfan's Guide to Museum & Park Displays. H. E. Cox.
- Downey, Cliff (January 1998). "The Last Decade of Illinois Central Steam". Railfan & Railroad. Vol. 17, no. 1. Carstens Publications. pp. 38–49.
- Downey, Clifford J. (2007). Chicago and the Illinois Central Railroad. Arcadia Publishing. ISBN 978-0-7385-5074-9.
- Downey, Clifford J. (2010). Kentucky and the Illinois Central Railroad. Arcadia Publishing. ISBN 978-0-7385-6661-0.
- Comer, Kevin (2012). Louisville & Nashville Railroad in South Central Kentucky. Arcadia Pub. ISBN 9780738592145.
- Drury, George H. (2015). Guide to North American Steam Locomotives (2nd ed.). Kalmbach Media. ISBN 978-1-62700-259-2.
