= Chicago, Burlington and Quincy 4000 =

Preserved American CB&Q S-4A class 4-6-4 locomotive

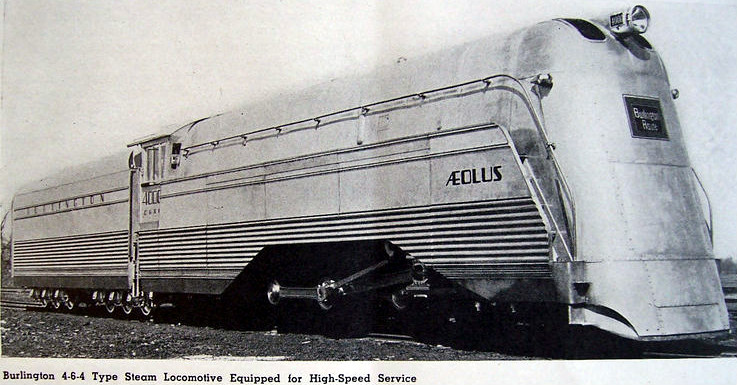
- No. 4000 shortly after it was rebuilt with streamlining in 1937
Type and origin
- Power type: Steam
- Builder: Baldwin Locomotive Works
- Serial number: 61500
- Build date: October 1930
- Rebuilder: Chicago, Burlington and Quincy Railroad
- Rebuild date: April 1937
Specifications
- Configuration
  - Whyte: 4-6-4
  - UIC: 2'C2'
- Gauge: 4 ft 8 1/2 in (1,435 mm)
- Driver dia.: 78 in (2,000 mm)
- Wheelbase: 82.23 ft (25.06 m)
  - Engine: 39.92 ft (12.17 m)
  - Drivers: 13.67 ft (4.17 m)
- Axle load: 69,780 lb (31,650 kg)
- Adhesive weight: 207,730 lb (94,220 kg)
- Loco weight: 391,880 lb (177,750 kg)
- Tender weight: 326,050 lb (147,890 kg)
- Total weight: 717,930 lb (325,650 kg)
- Fuel type: Coal
- Fuel capacity: 24 t (24 long tons; 26 short tons)
- Water cap.: 15,000 US gal (57,000 L; 12,000 imp gal)
- Firebox
  - Grate area: 87.90 sq ft (8.166 m^{2})
- Boiler pressure: 250 psi (1,700 kPa)
- Feedwater heater: Elesco
- Heating surface
  - Firebox: 369 sq ft (34.3 m^{2})
- Cylinders: Two, outside
- Cylinder size: 25 in × 28 in (640 mm × 710 mm)
- Valve gear: Baker
- Valve type: Piston valves
- Loco brake: Air
- Train brakes: Air
- Couplers: Knuckle
Performance figures
- Maximum speed: 105 mph (169 km/h)
- Tractive effort: 47,676 lbf (212,070 N) (Pre-1937); 47,700 lbf (212,000 N) (Post-1937)
- Factor of adh.: 4.36
Career
- Operators: Chicago, Burlington and Quincy Railroad
- Class: S-4 (Pre-1937); S-4A (Post-1937)
- Numbers: CB&Q 3002; CB&Q 4000
- Official name: Aeolus
- Nicknames: Big Alice the Goon
- Retired: September 1956
- Current owner: 4000 Foundation, Ltd
- Disposition: On static display

Chicago, Burlington and Quincy 4000, also known as Aeolus, is a preserved S-4A class 4-6-4 "Hudson" steam locomotive that was originally built by Baldwin in 1930 as S-4 locomotive No. 3002. It was primarily used to pull fast passenger trains before it was rebuilt by the Chicago, Burlington and Quincy Railroad in 1937 to be re-classified as an S-4A with Streamlining, and it was renumbered 4000 in the process.

The streamlining was removed during World War II, and the locomotive was later downgraded to secondary passenger and mail service. In 1956, No. 4000 pulled two excursion trains out of Chicago, Illinois before it was retired. The locomotive was donated to the city of La Crosse, Wisconsin in 1963, and it remains on static display in Copeland Park, as of 2026.

== History ==
=== Revenue service ===
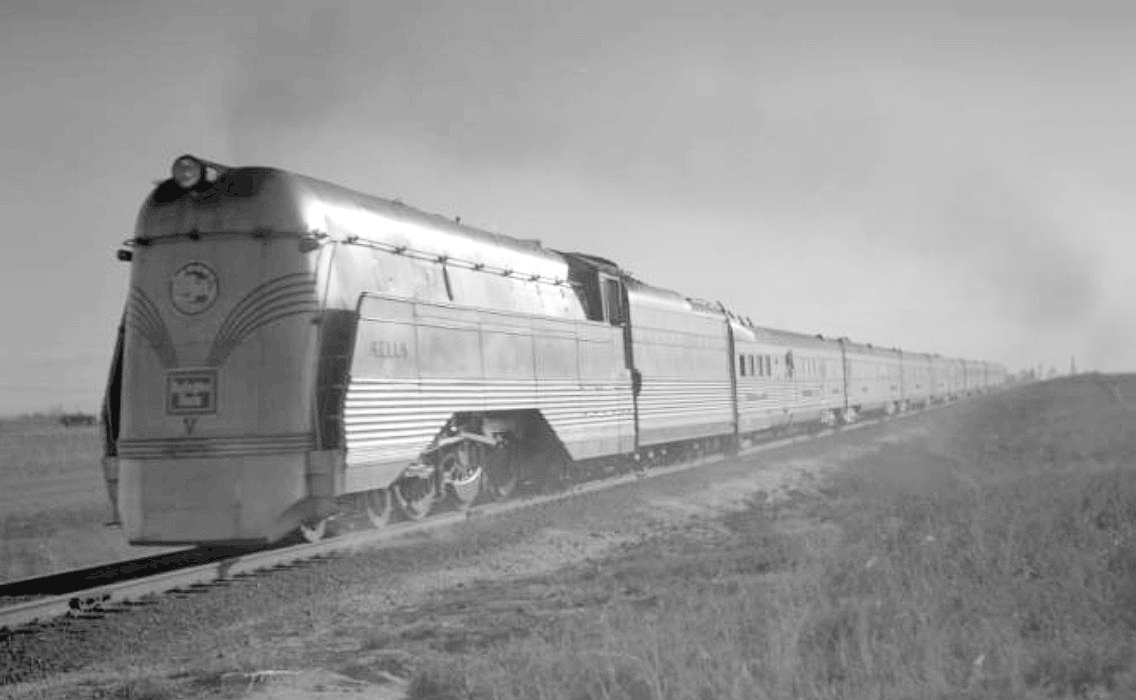
No. 4000 leading the Denver Zephyr in 1938

Between 1930 and 1935, the Chicago, Burlington and Quincy Railroad (CB&Q) ordered twelve S-4 class 4-6-4s from the Baldwin Locomotive Works of Philadelphia, Pennsylvania, as well as one from their own West Burlington, Iowa shops, and they were numbered 3000–3011. No. 4000 was numbered 3002 at the time, being the third locomotive of the class, and it was designed to pull the CB&Q's premier passenger trains across the road's system, such as the Chicago Limited between Chicago, Illinois and Denver, Colorado, and the American Royal between Chicago and Kansas City, Missouri.

As the 1930s progressed, the CB&Q also purchased a fleet of diesel locomotives from the Electro-Motive Corporation (EMC) as the first locomotives to ever be built with aerodynamic streamlining, and they were used to pull the CB&Q's newer trains that would become known as the Zephyrs. However, some of these units would occasionally break down, and a conventional steam locomotive would be needed to take its place, resulting in the train to be de-streamlined from the front end, and the train would not go as fast as the Zephyrs were designed to go. To that end, the CB&Q decided to streamline one of their own steam locomotives as back-up power for their diesel units; in late 1936, No. 3002 was taken to the CB&Q's West Burlington shops to be rebuilt with the application of a new valve gear frame, a middle Boxpok driving axle, lightweight roller bearing rods, roller bearing trailing bogies, and tender bogies. The locomotive also became the very first steam locomotive to be shrouded with stainless steel streamlining in the United States.With the modifications increasing the locomotive's tractive effort to 47,700 pounds-force (212 kN) and top speed to over 100 miles per hour (160 km/h), No. 3002 was reclassified as an S-4A, and it was renumbered to 4000. It was also given the official name Aeolus, being named after an ancient Greek God of the same name, as the CB&Q was giving Greek names to most of their Zephyr locomotives. After rolling out of the shops in April 1937, No. 4000 was reassigned to provide as an emergency backup locomotive to pull the Zephyr trains, such as the Denver Zephyr, the Silver Streak Zephyr, and the General Pershing Zephyr. No. 4000 received a classmate in 1938 in the form of No. 4001, which was also an S-4A that was shrouded with the "shovel-nose" streamlining. Eventually, No. 4000 was also nicknamed after a Popeye cartoon character "Big Alice the Goon", as a result of the locomotive's official name having a slight resemblance to "Alice".

The streamlining on the S-4As were removed in 1942, as the CB&Q was contributing to the World War II effort by scrapping most of their unnecessary equipment in favor of the war's steel drive. No. 4000 was also reassigned again to pull heavier trains that would carry military soldiers and military equipment. Once World War II ended, the CB&Q began investing in adding additional diesel locomotives to their fleet, and they began to dieselize their passenger trains. The CB&Q dieselized their entire passenger fleet on September 26, 1952, and No. 4000 and other 4-6-4s were subsequently retained as emergency backup power for when diesel locomotives broke down.

=== Excursion run and preservation ===
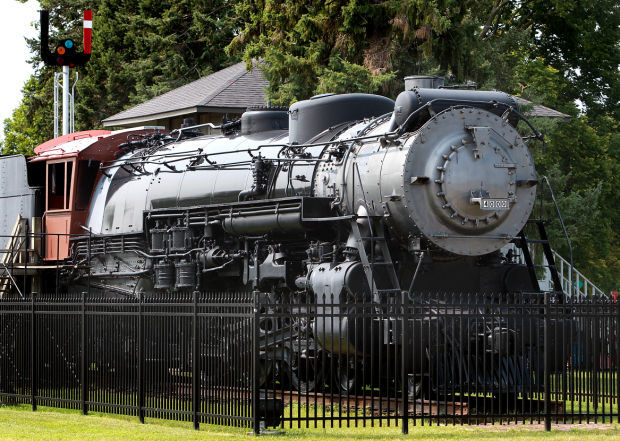
No. 4000 on display at Copeland Park in 2022

On July 1, 1956, No. 4000 was used to pull a railfan special train out of Chicago. The locomotive subsequently pulled another trip out of Chicago on September 2. With the success of the early fan trips, the CB&Q's president, Harry C. Murphy, decided to commission a full-fledged steam excursion program on the railroad that would last until 1966. Despite having pulled some of the 1956 fan trips, however, No. 4000 never took part in the program; the program mostly consisted of 2-8-2 No. 4960 and 4-8-4 No. 5632. Instead, No. 4000 spent six years sitting idle in Galesburg before it became secured for preservation. With the desire to preserve pieces of railroad history, a group of railroaders and enthusiasts in La Crosse, Wisconsin organized and founded The La Crosse Short Line Railroad Company. They requested the CB&Q to donate Aeolus to the city of La Crosse for static display in Copeland Park, a stadium park that takes place in North La Crosse.

After a two-year fundraising campaign, the locomotive was cosmetically restored and towed to its new home in Copeland Park along with a Milwaukee Road caboose on August 19, 1963. Subsequently, the locomotive has remained on outdoor static display, being exposed to the elements. Throughout the 1990s, a group of volunteers gathered to cosmetically refurbish the locomotive to make it look as good as it did during its revenue career. As of 2025, No. 4000 remains in Copeland Park while under the care of the 4000 Foundation. Occasionally, the foundation will host special events that take place around No. 4000's display site. Although there are no future plans for the locomotive to be brought back under steam, No. 4000 is in good enough condition to be rebuilt for operational purposes.

== See also ==
- Chicago, Burlington and Quincy class O-5
- Santa Fe class 3460
- Royal Hudson

== Bibliography ==
- Corbin, Bernard G.; Kerka, William F. (1960). Steam Locomotives of The Burlington Route (1st ed.). Bonanza Books. ISBN 0-517-26195-2.
- Stagner, Lloyd (1997). Burlington Route Steam Finale. David City, Nebraska: South Platte Press. ISBN 0-942035-38-0.
