= Grand Trunk Western 5629 =

Scrapped GTW K-4-a class 4-6-2 locomotive

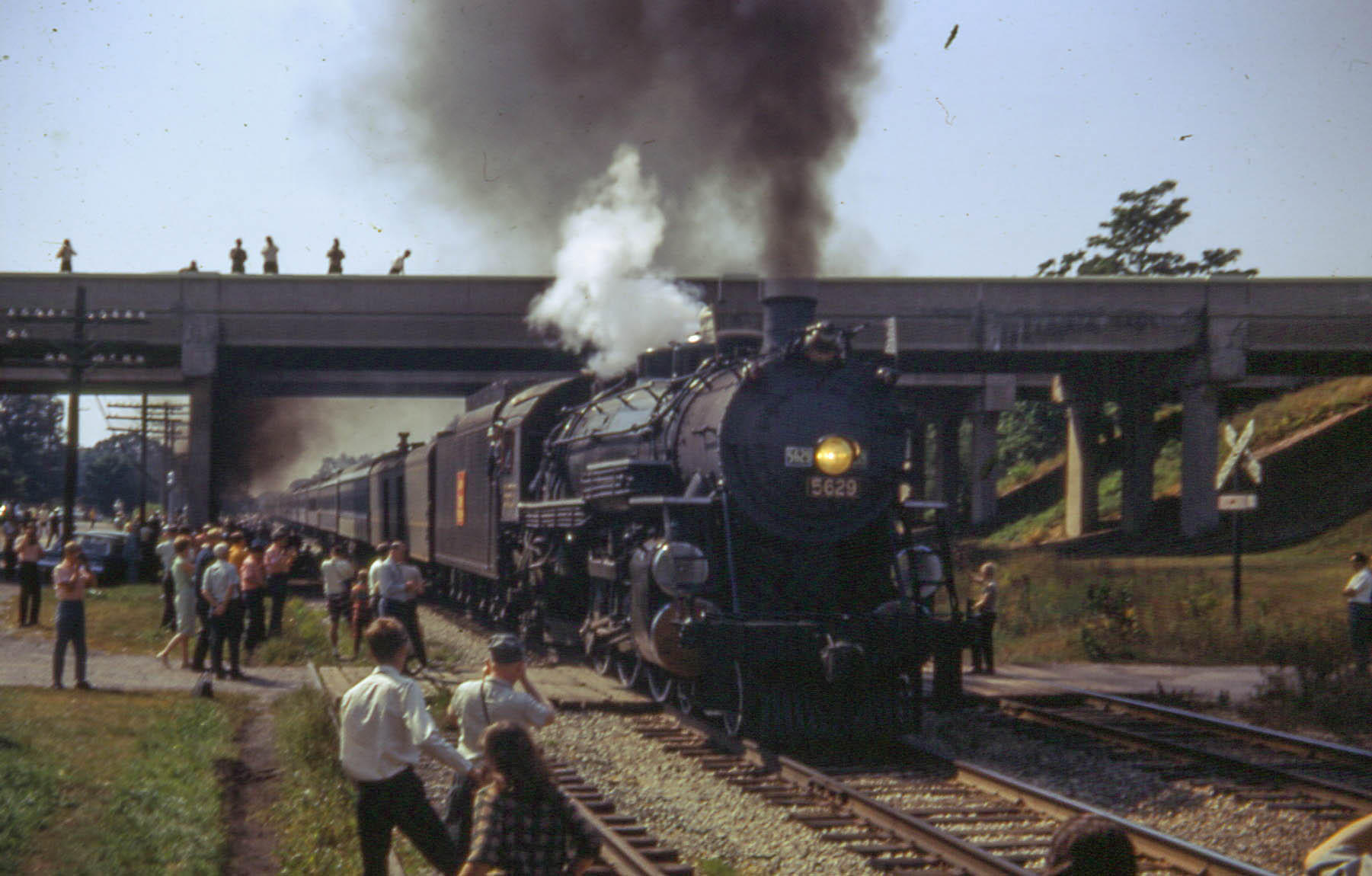
- No. 5629 passing through Kingsbury, Indiana with an excursion on September 17, 1967
Type and origin
- Power type: Steam
- Builder: American Locomotive Company (Schenectady Works)
- Serial number: 65290
- Build date: February 1924
Specifications
- Configuration
  - Whyte: 4-6-2
  - UIC: 2′C1′ h1
- Gauge: 4 ft 8 1/2 in (1,435 mm) standard gauge
- Driver dia.: 73 in (1,854 mm)
- Wheelbase: 70.62 ft (21.52 m)
  - Engine: 35.82 ft (10.92 m)
  - Drivers: 13 ft (4.0 m)
- Adhesive weight: 170,000 lb (77,000 kilograms; 77 metric tons)
- Loco weight: 285,500 lb (129,500 kilograms; 129.5 metric tons)
- Tender weight: Old tender: 198,800 lb (90,200 kilograms; 90.2 metric tons); New tender: 328,000 lb (149,000 kilograms; 149 metric tons)
- Total weight: Original: 484,300 lb (219,700 kilograms; 219.7 metric tons); Modified: 613,500 lb (278,300 kilograms; 278.3 metric tons)
- Fuel type: Coal
- Fuel capacity: Old tender: 16 t (16 long tons; 18 short tons); New tender: 22 t (22 long tons; 24 short tons)
- Water cap.: Old tender: 10,000 US gal (38,000 L; 8,300 imp gal); New tender: 18,000 US gal (68,000 L; 15,000 imp gal)
- Firebox
  - Grate area: 66.70 sq ft (6.197 m^{2})
- Boiler pressure: 200 psi (1.38 MPa)
- Feedwater heater: Worthington
- Heating surface
  - Firebox: 242 sq ft (22.5 m^{2})
- Superheater
  - Type: Schmidt
  - Heating area: 794 sq ft (73.8 m^{2})
- Cylinders: Two, outside
- Cylinder size: 25 in × 28 in (635 mm × 711 mm)
- Valve gear: Walschaerts
- Valve type: Piston valves
- Loco brake: Air
- Train brakes: Air
- Couplers: Knuckle
Performance figures
- Maximum speed: 80 mph (130 km/h)
- Tractive effort: 40,753 lbf (181.28 kN)
- Factor of adh.: 4.17
Career
- Operators: Grand Trunk Western Railroad; Railroad Club of Chicago
- Class: K-4-a
- Number in class: 3rd of 5
- Numbers: GTW 5629; B&O 5629
- Delivered: March 1924
- Last run: April 1969
- Retired: March 1960 (revenue service); April 1971 (excursion service)
- Restored: October 1961 (1st excursion service); 1966 (2nd excursion service)
- Scrapped: July 1987
- Disposition: Scrapped

Grand Trunk Western 5629 was a K-4-a class 4-6-2 "Pacific" type steam locomotive, which was a copy of the United States Railroad Administration's (USRA) Light Pacific design, built by American Locomotive Company's (ALCO) Schenectady Works in February 1924, for the Grand Trunk Western Railroad (GTW). It was used to haul commuter passenger trains in Michigan until March 1960, when it was purchased by Chicago-based railfan Richard Jensen, who used No. 5629 to pull several excursion trains in the Chicago area throughout the 1960s.

After Jensen ran into some financial trouble in the 1970s, he stored his locomotive at the Rock Island Railroad's (RI) freight yard in Blue Island, Illinois. In 1980, Metra Commuter Rail, acquired the Blue Island freight yard, wanted Jensen to remove the No. 5629 locomotive from it. But Jensen, knowing that his locomotive was in very poor condition, decided to have Metra scrap it and filed a lawsuit against them in order to recoup his financial trouble. Several preservation groups, including the Illinois Railway Museum, offered to purchase No. 5629 from Jensen, who declined. In July 1987, Metra, unable to seize ownership of the No. 5629 locomotive, reluctantly scrapped it under the court order.

At first, the railfan community was upset with Metra's decision to scrap the No. 5629 locomotive, but Metra soon revealed that they tried to remove the locomotive intact from their Blue Island yard, but they had no way to do it due to legal issues and Jensen's negligence and uncooperativeness. On the other hand, Jensen filed a lawsuit against Metra as planned but eventually lost the case. His decision to let the No. 5629 locomotive getting scrapped was heavily controversial.

== History ==
=== Construction and revenue service ===
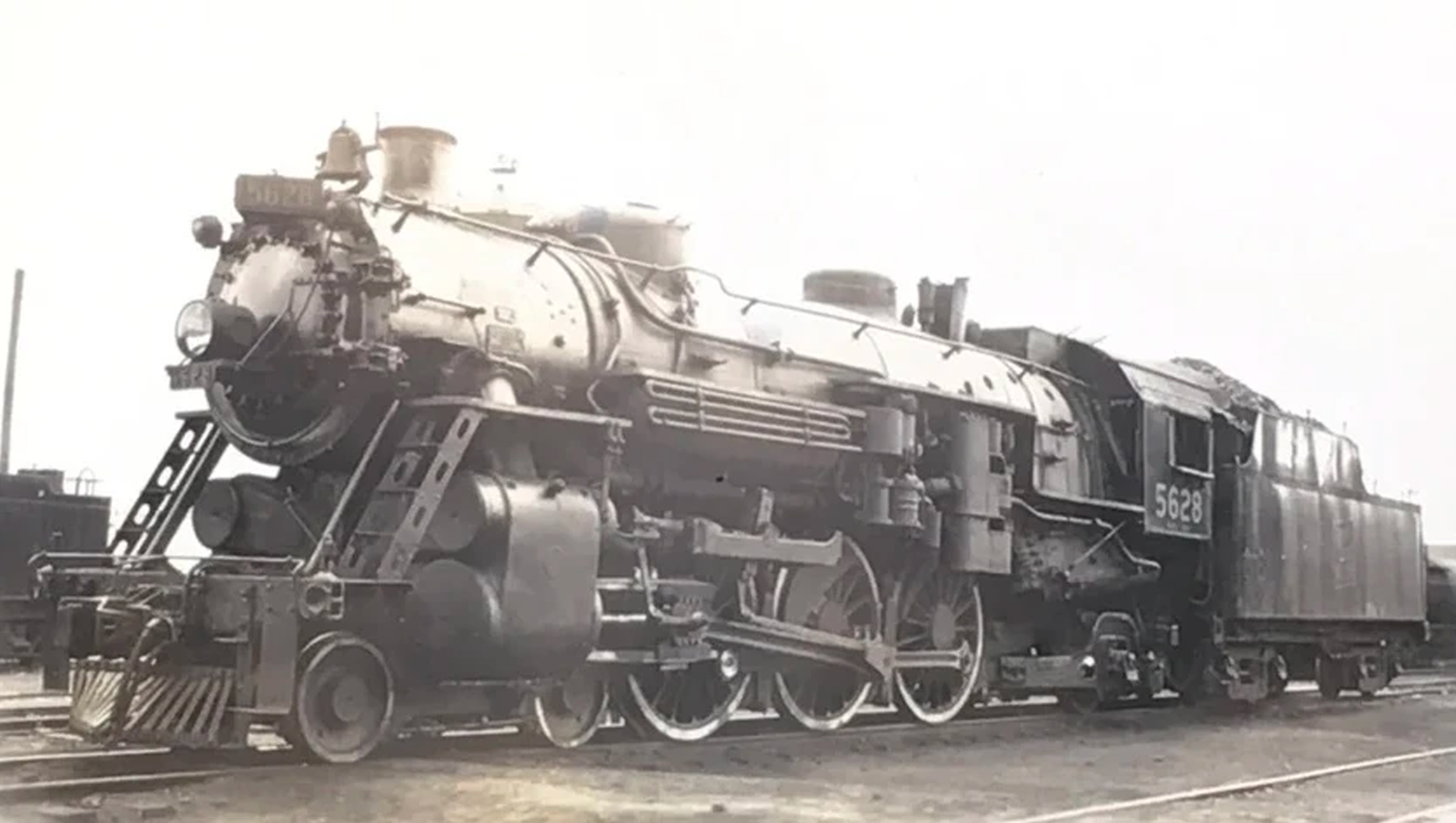
No. 5628, a fellow K-4-a class locomotive to No. 5629

No. 5629 was one of five K-4-a class 4-6-2 "Pacific" locomotives (Nos. 5627-5631) built in 1924 by American Locomotive Company (ALCO) of Schenectady, New York, for the Grand Trunk Western (GTW). The K-4-a locomotives were copies of the United States Railroad Administration's (USRA) Light Pacific design. The only difference from the USRA design is that the K-4-a class was equipped with a Delta type trailing truck, Walschaerts valve gear, and a Worthington feedwater heater, while the USRA design had a Cole-Scoville type trailing truck, Baker valve gear, and no feedwater heater.

The GTW assigned No. 5629 to pull passenger trains in their Chicago Division between Port Huron, Michigan, and Chicago, Illinois. After the railroad received U-3-b class 4-8-4s in 1942, No. 5629 was reassigned to pull freight and commuter trains in the GTW's Detroit Division between Detroit and Muskegon. On September 27, 1959, No. 5629 was tasked to pull an excursion fantrip for the Michigan Railroad Club between Detroit and Bay City, Michigan. After the excursion, No. 5629 was scheduled to be removed from service and sold for scrap alongside the rest of the K-4-as.

=== Excursion service ===
Richard "Dick" Jensen, a member of the Railroad Club of Chicago, was in search of a steam locomotive to buy and use to pull his own excursion trains. He was one of the passengers on the excursion that No. 5629 pulled, and upon learning about the locomotive's planned retirement and scrapping, Jensen decided to buy the K-4-a.

Having saved up money from his job as a Brownberry bread delivery driver, Jensen purchased No. 5629 from the GTW on April 4, 1960, for its scrap value of $9,540.40. It was subsequently moved to a siding rented from the Baltimore and Ohio Railroad (B&O) in Hammond, Indiana, where Jensen worked to restore No. 5629 to operating condition with assistance from some volunteers, including two experienced Illinois Central employees.

Jensen created a routine to work fifty hours a week after his bakery job to repair the K-4-a. He had the parts of No. 5629 replaced to alter its cosmetic appearance, including the bell, the headlight, the front number plate, and the cylinder-head coverings. The Interstate Commerce Commission (ICC) had to inspect the locomotive for eligibility to legally operate. In October 1961, No. 5629 performed some test runs, and on November 5, it pulled a tour excursion on the Baltimore and Ohio Chicago Terminal Railroad (B&OCT), and it was co-sponsored by the Illinois Railroad Club and the Palos Hills Civic Association.

"I knew that railroads scrapped steam locomotives when they switched to diesels and the idea struck me to buy one, restore it to its former glory myself, then see if I could talk railroads into using it for excursions."

— Richard Jensen, during No. 5629's restoration in October 1961.

On June 17, 1962, No. 5629 pulled a Father's Day excursion on the B&O mainline between Chicago and Walkerton, Indiana. The K-4-a did not pull any additional excursions on the B&O, since it required new flues, and the midwestern steam excursion market was saturated by the GTW and the Burlington Route (CB&Q), so the locomotive was placed into storage at a B&O roundhouse in Hammond. In 1964, Jensen reached an agreement with Robert McMillian, the president of the Chicago and Western Indiana Railroad (C&WI), to have No. 5629 and other equipment of his be stored inside the C&WI's 47th Street Roundhouse in downtown Chicago.

During 1966, the Burlington Route announced that it would discontinue its steam program, so Jensen envisioned the benefits of having the midwestern excursion market for himself. Planning to use his locomotive for long-distance excursions, Jensen replaced No. 5629's original tender with a larger one that came from a Soo Line 4-8-2 to upgrade its coal capacity to 22 tonnes (22,000 kg) and its water capacity to 18,000 US gallons (14,988 imp gal). Around May of that same year, during the sesquicentennial of Indiana's statehood, the Indiana Museum of Transportation of Noblesville leased No. 5629 to pull multiple sesquicentennial excursions on the Norfolk and Western’s (N&W) Ex-Nickel Plate Road mainline between Indianapolis and Noblesville, and over 14,000 passengers rode the trains. During two of the excursions, No. 5629 suffered some mechanical problems, and it had to be repaired in Indianapolis while diesel locomotives pulled the trains. In early July, No. 5629 travelled to Springfield, Illinois for temporary storage on an N&W siding, since businessman Donald Cooper was to lease the locomotive for use in pulling tourist trains between Springfield and Beardstown over Chicago and Illinois Midland (C&IM) trackage, but for unknown reasons, the tourist operations were cancelled. In late October, No. 5629 pulled two Railroad Club of Chicago excursions on the GTW between Chicago and South Bend, Indiana, and the K-4-a continued to pull excursion trains over the GTW for the next three years.

On June 30, 1967, No. 5629 was tasked to replace Burlington Route 4960 in pulling the annual Schlitz Circus World Museum (CWM) train on the Chicago and North Western (C&NW) between Baraboo and Milwaukee, Wisconsin. No. 5629 pulled the Schlitz CWM train again on June 29, 1968, but en route, the locomotive suffered an overheated bearing that required emergency repairs, and it resulted in the train's late arrival and the cancellation of that year's circus parade, and unforeseen rain occurred that day.

Also in 1968, Southern Railway (SOU) president W. Graham Claytor Jr. sought to purchase No. 5629 for use in the SOU steam program while cosmetically altered to resemble a SOU Ps-4 locomotive. Claytor sent the SOU Chief Council James A. Bistline to Chicago to negotiate with Jensen, but the latter asked for an unattainable amount of money, and No. 5629 remained under Jensen's ownership. In February 1969, No. 5629 was tasked to pull a Michigan Railroad Club-sponsored excursion between Detroit and Bay City, but as it began to depart, its steam heater for the consist broke down while the locomotive had inadequate steaming, and the excursion had to be completed behind diesel locomotives. No. 5629 subsequently pulled another Michigan Railroad Club-sponsored excursion on April 13, between Detroit and Port Huron without incident, and it was likely the locomotive's last ever excursion run.

Simultaneously, legal disputes began between Jensen and the new owners of the C&WI, with most of his equipment being removed from the 47th Street Roundhouse and illegally sold to a scrap dealer. No. 5629's original GTW tender was among the equipment involved, and it would eventually be scrapped in the early 1970s. Since the No. 5629 locomotive was stored in Detroit for excursion usage, it was uninvolved with the disputes, but the illegal sale of his equipment resulted in the beginning of Jensen's financial deficit. Railroads around the Chicago area were also diminishing their passenger operations to reduce costs, and they were unable to provide anymore insurance or passenger equipment for Jensen's excursion trains. As a result of the deficit and a lack of company support, Jensen was unable to operate anymore excursions with No. 5629 after 1969.

=== Second retirement ===
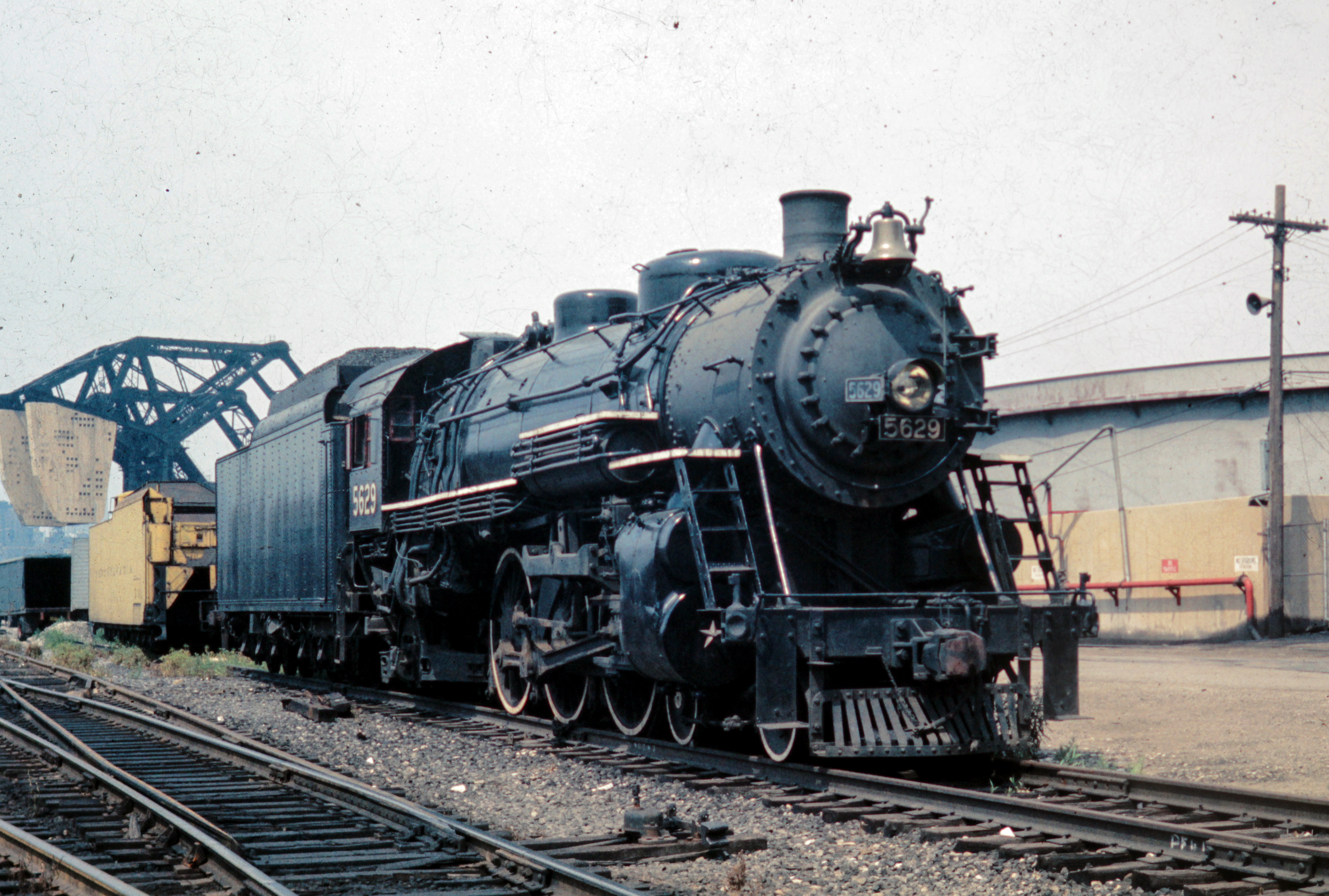
5629 idling at Penn Central's Chicago yard on July 7, 1971, after Jensen cancelled its intended excursion

Jensen later planned to use No. 5629 to pull an excursion on April 25, 1971, over the Penn Central (PC) mainline between Chicago and Logansport, and the K-4-a was moved to PC's Ex-Pennsylvania Railroad (PRR) diesel service yard outside the Chicago Union Station. Despite tickets being sold out, the excursion was cancelled at the last minute, as a result of issues over arranging passenger cars for the run, and several ticket-buyers of the excursion did not receive refunds.

In late 1977, Jensen fell down the stairs at a three-story apartment building while helping a friend move a refrigerator to the third floor. The incident left Jensen critically injured, and after being hospitalized, he could no longer afford to pay rent to the places where he was storing his remaining equipment. Being an ordinary working man, Jensen subsequently tried to negotiate with several railroads around Chicago to have No. 5629 stored on their property, but they all rejected his requests. As a last resort, he reached an agreement with the financially-struggling Rock Island Railroad (RI), and they allowed the locomotive to be stored inside their deteriorating roundhouse at the Burr Oak yard in Blue Island, Illinois.

=== Scrapping and aftermath ===
"All Metra wants is the engine off our land, since it won't roll, the only alternative is to cut it up. It's a hunk of rust, it's sad the way he (Richard Jensen) let it deteriorate. We started sending him bills and he never sent us a nickel."

— Metra spokesman Chris Knapton

In 1979, the roundhouse was scheduled for demolition, and Jensen moved No. 5629 towards the middle of the freight yard. In March 1980, RI was liquidated, and ownership of the Burr Oak yard was transferred to Metra Commuter Rail, who made plans to construct a new facility on the property. When Metra acquired the property, Jensen never paid rent to what was owed for storing his No. 5629 locomotive. After redevelopment plans were finalized, Metra requested Jensen to remove No. 5629 from the yard. When Jensen inspected No. 5629 to be moved, he discovered that it was vandalized with the track in front of the locomotive already removed, leaving it landlocked. This discovery made Jensen believe that if he did not do anything to move his locomotive, he could eventually allow Metra to scrap it, file a suit against them, and gain a million dollars in a similar manner as to what he did to C&WI for illegally scrapping CB&Q No. 5632 back in 1972.

Upon hearing No. 5629's vandalized condition, Metra offered to help Jensen, but he declined and became uncooperative as he removed several moving parts off the locomotive, including the axle bearings. By late 1985, Metra, infuriated with Jensen's negligence and lack of cooperation, filed a lawsuit against him, in an attempt to have No. 5629 removed intact. But the ruling was that if Jensen could not cooperate, Metra would be allowed to dismantle the locomotive as the only alternative decision. Upon hearing Metra's reluctance to scrap No. 5629, several preservation groups, including the Illinois Railway Museum and the Mid-Continent Railway Museum, offered to purchase the locomotive for $15,000 from Jensen, and Metra supported them, but Jensen declined their offers. At that point, Metra requested permission from the court to seize ownership of No. 5629, so they could sell or donate it to someone who would be able to remove it, but the court declined; Metra only received removal rights to regain use of their property, and they were not allowed to claim ownership of the locomotive since it was still owned by Jensen.

On June 14, 1987, a judge newly assigned to the case decided that the disputes had continued long enough, and an exhausted Metra received a court order to scrap the locomotive. For reasons unknown, Jensen appealed the order, but it was rejected by court. Metra contracted with the Erman-Howell Division of the Luria Brothers Scrap Company to dispose of No. 5629. (Note: Ironically, Erman-Howell was the same company that scrapped CB&Q No. 5632.) On July 14, the scrapping process began. Several railfans travelled to Burr Oak yard to witness the scrapping, but some were escorted out of the property by Metra Police officers. On July 17, the scrapping process stopped, and by July 20, No. 5629's remains were removed and trucked out of the yard. After the scrapping, Jensen filed a lawsuit against Metra and requested money to compensate for his locomotive, but he lost the case. Additionally, Metra discovered that the vandalism on No. 5629 prior to the legal battle had been done by their employees, several of which were dismissed following a subsequent investigation. After the incident, Jensen, still in poor health from his freak accident 10 years prior, became loathed by the railfan community for letting No. 5629 get scrapped and later died on March 16, 1991, at the age of 59.

== Gallery ==
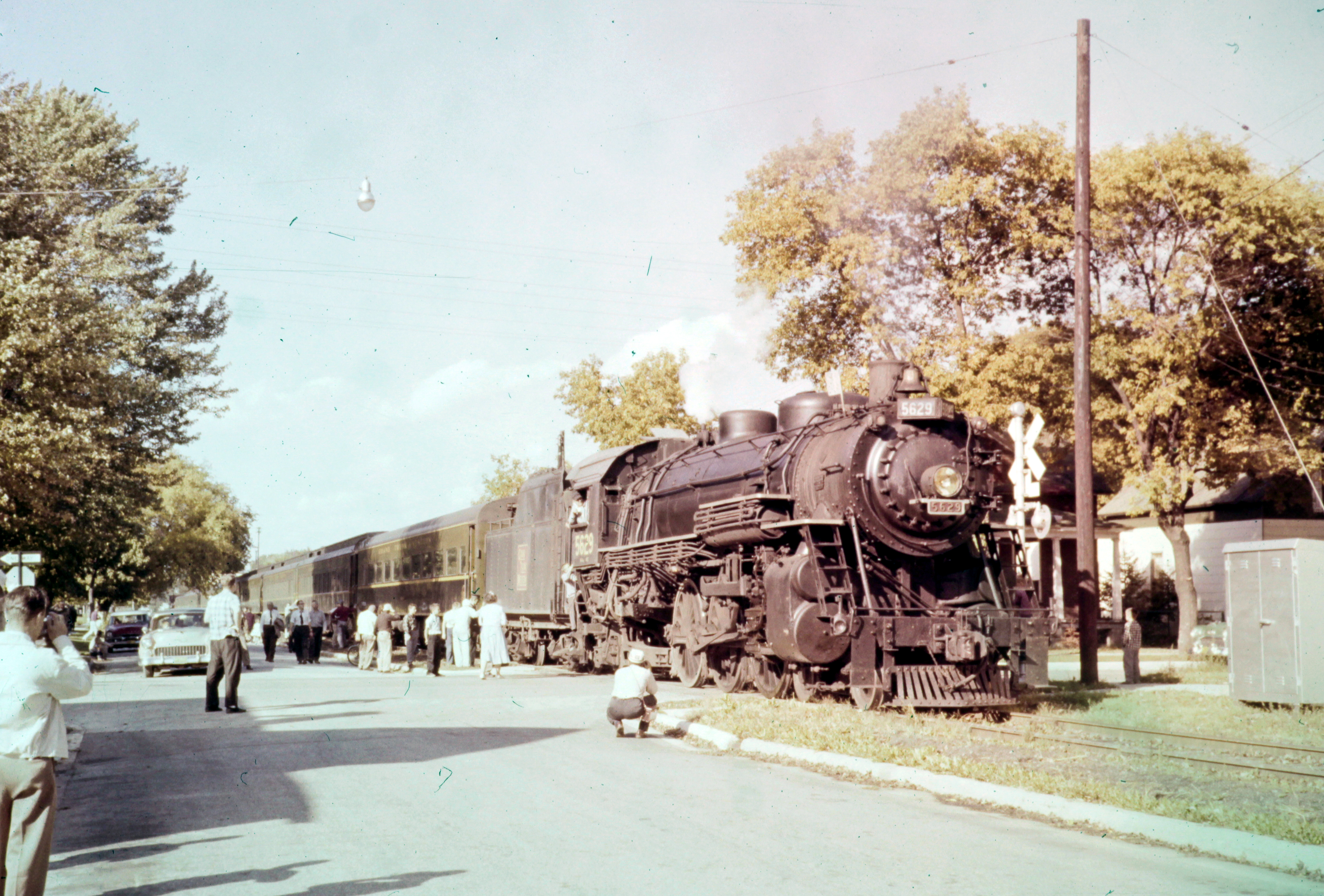
No. 5629 hauling a Michigan Railroad Club-sponsored excursion shortly before its retirement from the GTW, September 27, 1959

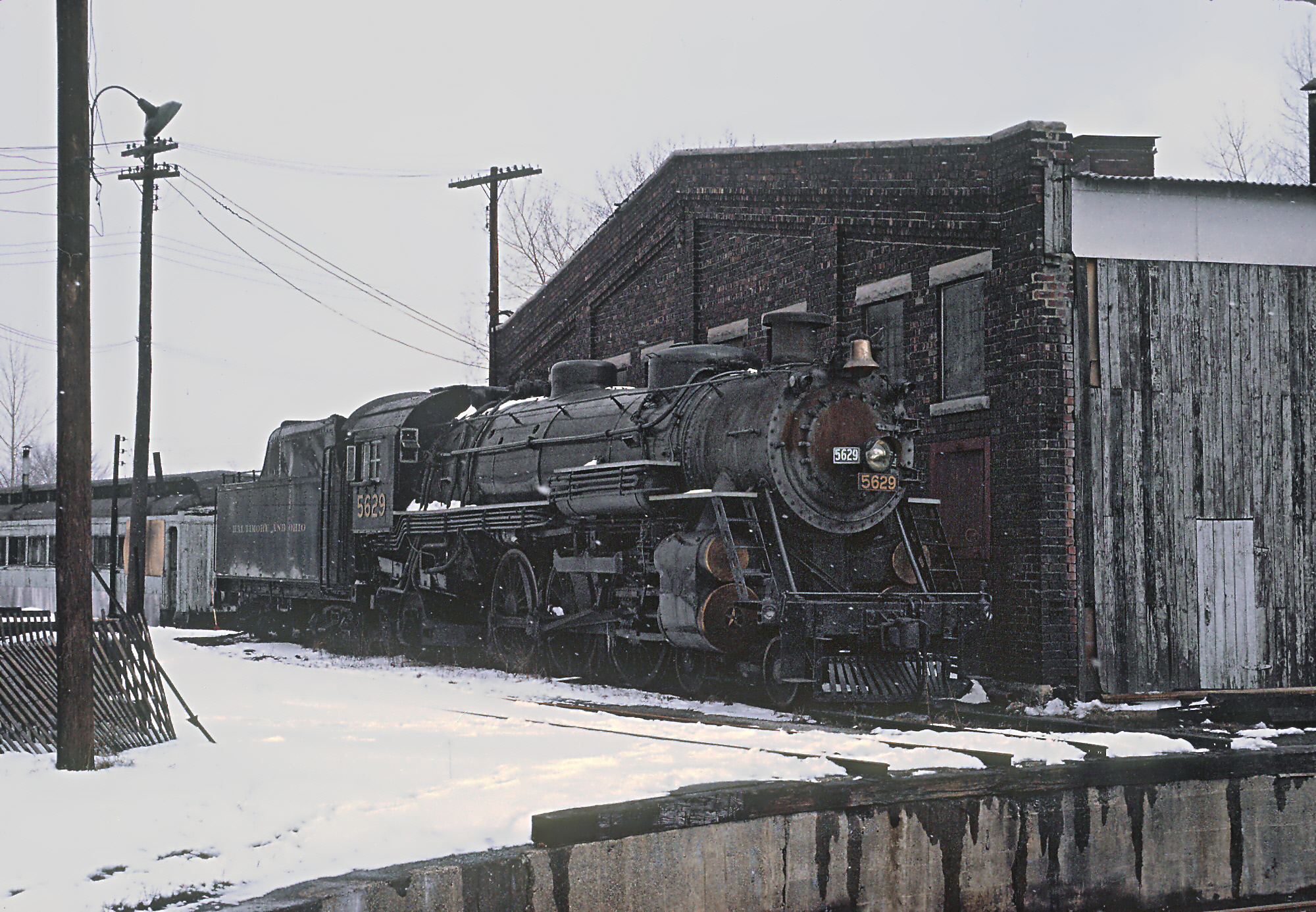
GTW No. 5629 being stored at a Monon Railroad yard roundhouse in Hammond, Indiana, on March 31, 1964

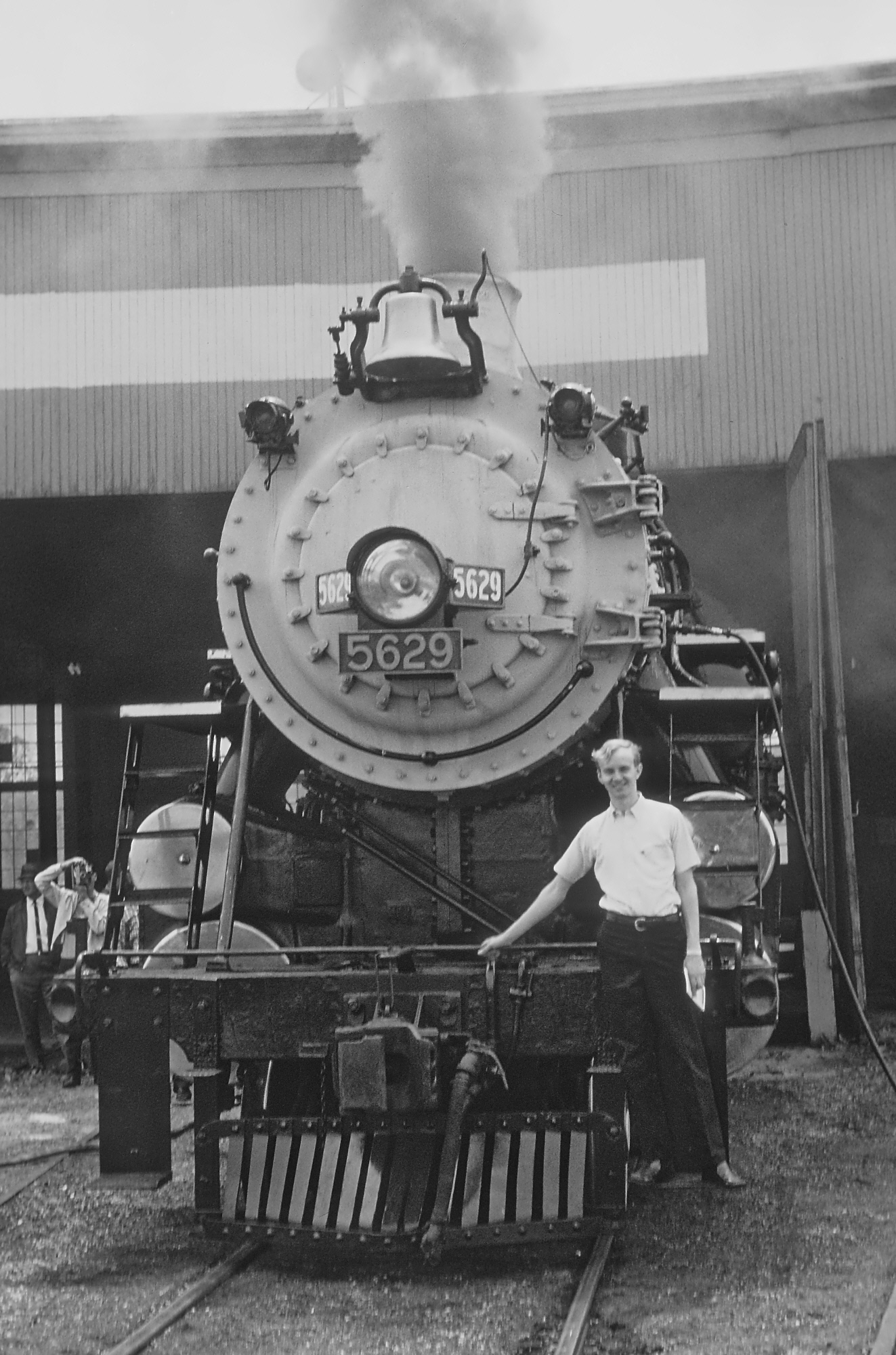
Railroad photographer Roger Puta standing on the pilot steps of No. 5629 at an N&W roundhouse in Indianapolis, on May 21, 1966

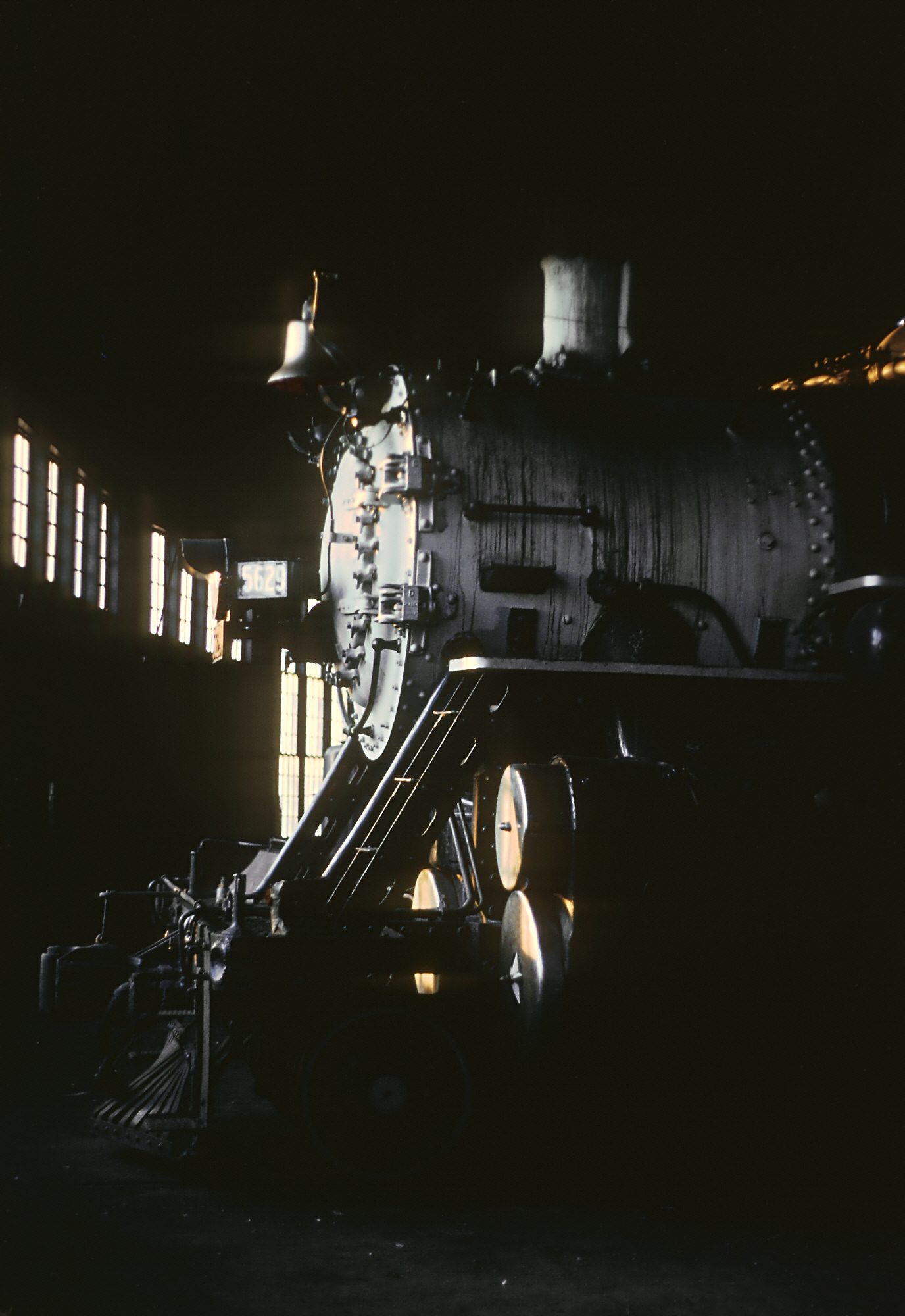
GTW No. 5629 being stored inside the C&WI's 47th Street Roundhouse, on November 17, 1966

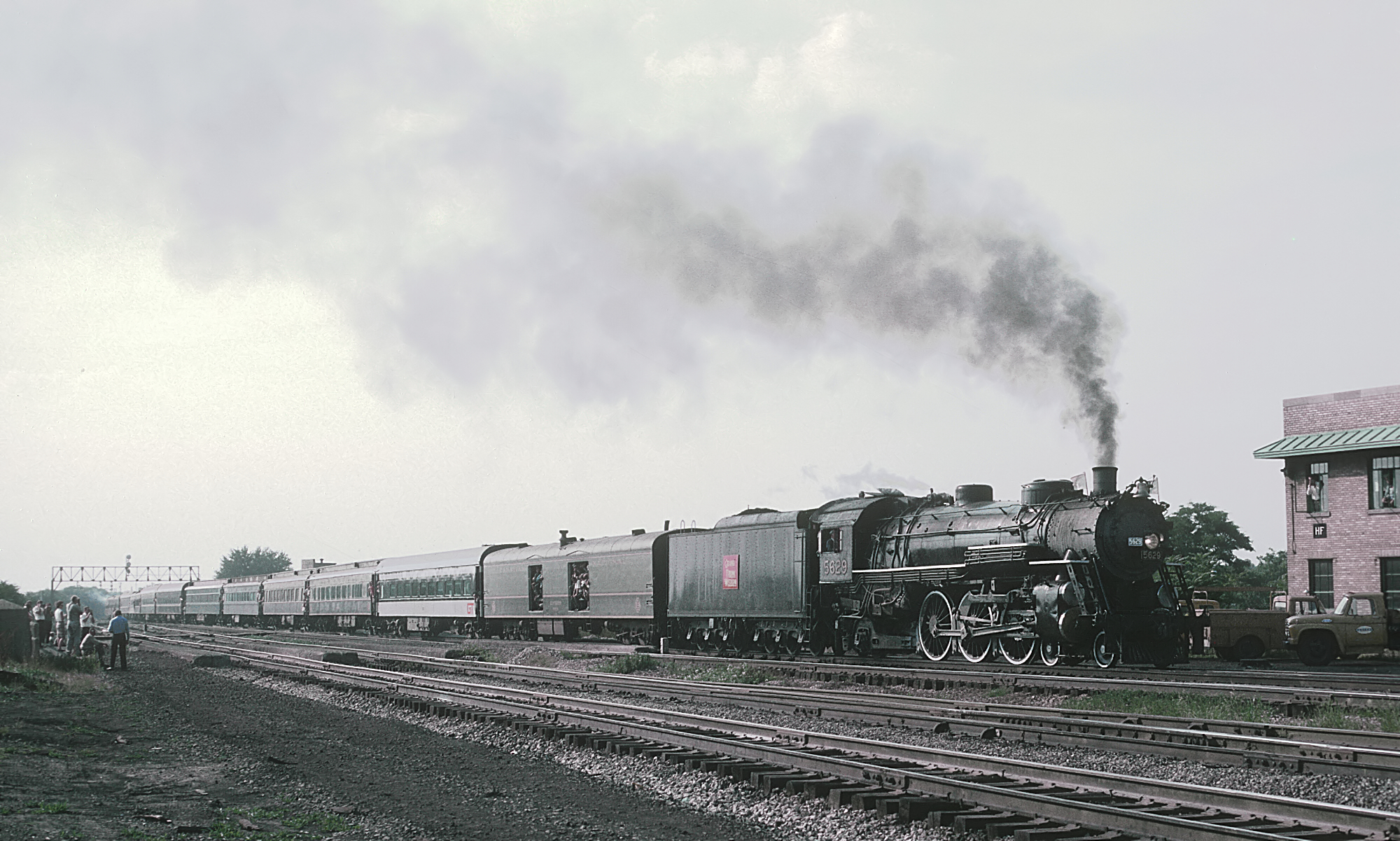
GTW No. 5629 pulling a fantrip excursion into South Bend, Indiana, on September 17, 1967

== See also ==
- Atlantic Coast Line 1504
- Chicago, Burlington and Quincy 4963
- Chicago and North Western 1385
- Grand Trunk Western 4070
- Grand Trunk Western 5632
- Grand Trunk Western 6323
- Grand Trunk Western 6325
- Nickel Plate Road 587

== Bibliography ==
- Boyd, Jim (2000). The Steam Locomotive: A Century of North American Classics (1st ed.). Barnes & Noble Books. ISBN 0-7607-1627-7.
- Dorin, Patrick C. (1977). The Grand Trunk Western Railroad: A Canadian National Railway (1st ed.). Superior Publishing Company. ISBN 0-87564-526-7.
- Drury, George (2015). Guide to North American Steam Locomotives, Revised Edition (2nd ed.). Kalmbach Publishing. ISBN 978-1-62700-259-2.
- Huddleston, Eugene L. (2002). Uncle Sam's Locomotives: The USRA and the Nation's Railroads (1st ed.). Indiana University Press. ISBN 0-253-34086-1.
- McQueen, Donald R. (2013). Canadian National Steam!: A Locomotive History of The People's Railway (1st ed.). Railfare DC Books. ISBN 978-1-927599-00-6.
- Nelson, Bruce (2013). America's Greatest Circus Train (1st ed.). Heimburger House Publishing Company. ISBN 978-0-911581-64-5.
- Ziel, Ron (1990). Mainline Steam Revival (1st ed.). Amereon House. ISBN 0-8488-0863-0.
