= Grand Canyon Railway 4960 =

Preserved American CB&Q O-1A class 2-8-2 locomotive

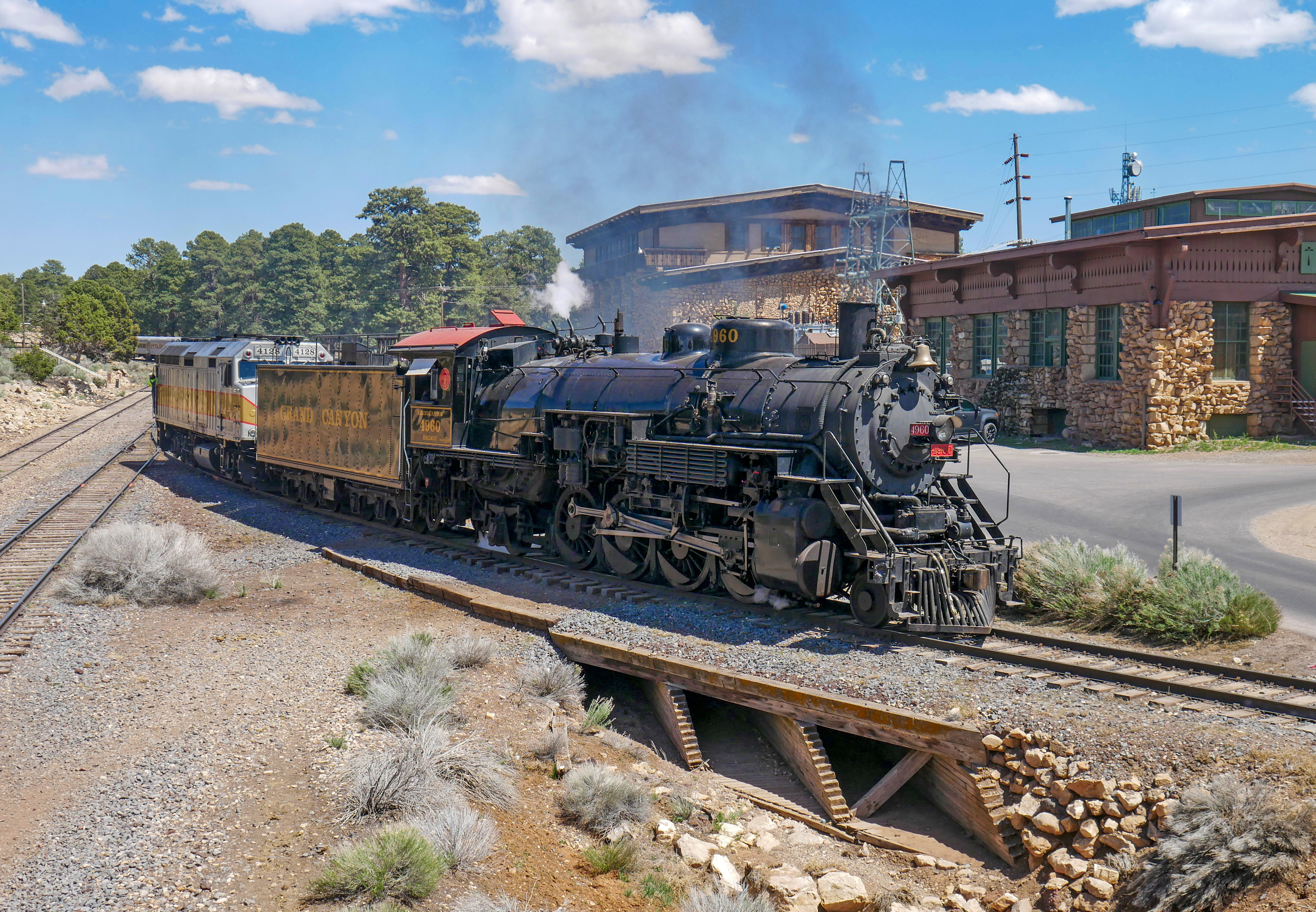
- No. 4960 traversing from its excursion to be refueled, during a round-trip layover at the Grand Canyon Village, May 6, 2023
Type and origin
- Power type: Steam
- Builder: Baldwin Locomotive Works
- Serial number: 56809
- Build date: August 1923
Specifications
- Configuration
  - Whyte: 2-8-2
  - UIC: 1'D1
- Gauge: 4 ft 8 1/2 in (1,435 mm)
- Leading dia.: 33 in (0.838 m)
- Driver dia.: 64 in (1.626 m)
- Trailing dia.: 42 1/2 in (1.080 m)
- Tender wheels: 33 in (0.838 m)
- Wheelbase: 70 ft 0 in (21.34 m)
  - Engine: 33 ft 9 1/2 in (10.30 m)
  - Drivers: 15 ft 21 in (5.11 m)
- Height: 15 ft 10 1/2 in (4.84 m)
- Adhesive weight: 233,850 lb (106,070 kg)
- Loco weight: 310,780 lb (140,970 kg)
- Tender weight: 195,300 lb (88,600 kg)
- Total weight: 506,080 lb (229,550 kg)
- Fuel type: New: Coal; Now: Recycled vegetable oil
- Fuel capacity: Old tender: 42,000 lb (19,000 kg); New tender: 3,800 US gal (14,000 L; 3,200 imp gal)
- Water cap.: Old tender: 10,000 US gal (38,000 L; 8,300 imp gal); New tender: 18,000 US gal (68,000 L; 15,000 imp gal)
- Firebox
  - Grate area: 59 sq ft (5.5 m^{2})
- Boiler
  - Small tubes: 2 1/4 in (57 mm)
  - Large tubes: 5 1/2 in (140 mm)
- Boiler pressure: 200 psi (1,400 kPa)
- Feedwater heater: Worthington
- Heating surface
  - Firebox: 254.00 sq ft (23.597 m^{2})
  - Tubes: 2,179.00 sq ft (202.436 m^{2})
  - Arch tubes: 33.00 sq ft (3.066 m^{2})
  - Flues: 905.00 sq ft (84.077 m^{2})
  - Tubes and flues: 3,409.00 sq ft (316.706 m^{2})
  - Total surface: 4,178.00 sq ft (388.149 m^{2})
- Superheater
  - Heating area: 769.00 sq ft (71.442 m^{2})
- Cylinders: Two, outside
- Cylinder size: 27 in × 30 in (690 mm × 760 mm)
- Valve gear: Walschaerts
- Valve type: Piston valves
- Loco brake: Air
- Train brakes: Air
- Couplers: Knuckle
Performance figures
- Tractive effort: 58,090 lbf (258.40 kN)
- Factor of adh.: 3.85
Career
- Operators: Chicago, Burlington and Quincy Railroad; Bristol and North Western Railroad; Grand Canyon Railway
- Class: O-1A
- Numbers: CB&Q 4960; B&NW 4960; GCRY 4960
- Nicknames: The Great Teacher (When hauling school trains); Tenshodo Mikado (When painted brass); The Green Machine; The French Fry Express
- Retired: 1958 (revenue service); July 17, 1966 (1st excursion service); March 1985 (2nd excursion service)
- Restored: December 28, 1958 (1st excursion service); March 1, 1981 (2nd excursion service); July 9, 1996 (3rd excursion service)
- Current owner: Grand Canyon Railway
- Disposition: Operational

Grand Canyon Railway 4960 is a preserved O-1A class 2-8-2 "Mikado" type steam locomotive, built in August 1923 by the Baldwin Locomotive Works (BLW) for the Chicago, Burlington and Quincy Railroad (CB&Q). It was used by the CB&Q to pull freight trains until 1958, when the locomotive pulled its first excursion train, as part of the railroad's steam excursion program.

No. 4960, along with 4-8-4 No. 5632, went on to pull several more trains for the steam program, including a train that was dedicated to the CB&Q's connection to Casper, Wyoming. In July 1966, the CB&Q discontinued their steam program, following a rise in insurance costs, a loss of experienced steam-age mechanics, and a change of management.

No. 4960 was subsequently donated to the Circus World Museum (CWM) of Baraboo, Wisconsin, who in turn donated it to the Mid-Continent Railway Museum (MCRY) of North Freedom, Wisconsin, where it was left in storage. In the early 1980s, the Bristol and North Western Railroad (B&NW) leased the locomotive for use on their tourist operation between Benhams and Bristol, Virginia. No. 4960's time on the B&NW was short-lived, and in 1985, the locomotive was moved to New Haven, Indiana for further storage.

In 1989, the Grand Canyon Railway (GCR) purchased No. 4960 at an undisclosed cost, and a few years later, it was moved to the railway's location in Williams, Arizona. There, No. 4960 was extensively reconditioned with multiple modifications to improve its performance and cosmetics, abandoning its original CB&Q livery. No. 4960 entered service for GCR in July 1996, and it began pulling the railway's passenger trains between Williams and the South Rim of the Grand Canyon.

In 2008, GCR's new parent company, Xanterra, discontinued their steam operations, but they resumed with reduced schedules the following year, with No. 4960 being converted to burn waste vegetable oil. As of 2026, No. 4960 remains operational at GCR, and it serves as a stablemate to Ex-Lake Superior and Ishpeming (LS&I) 2-8-0 No. 29. Additionally, No. 4960 is the only ex-CB&Q steam locomotive in operation.

== History ==
=== Design ===
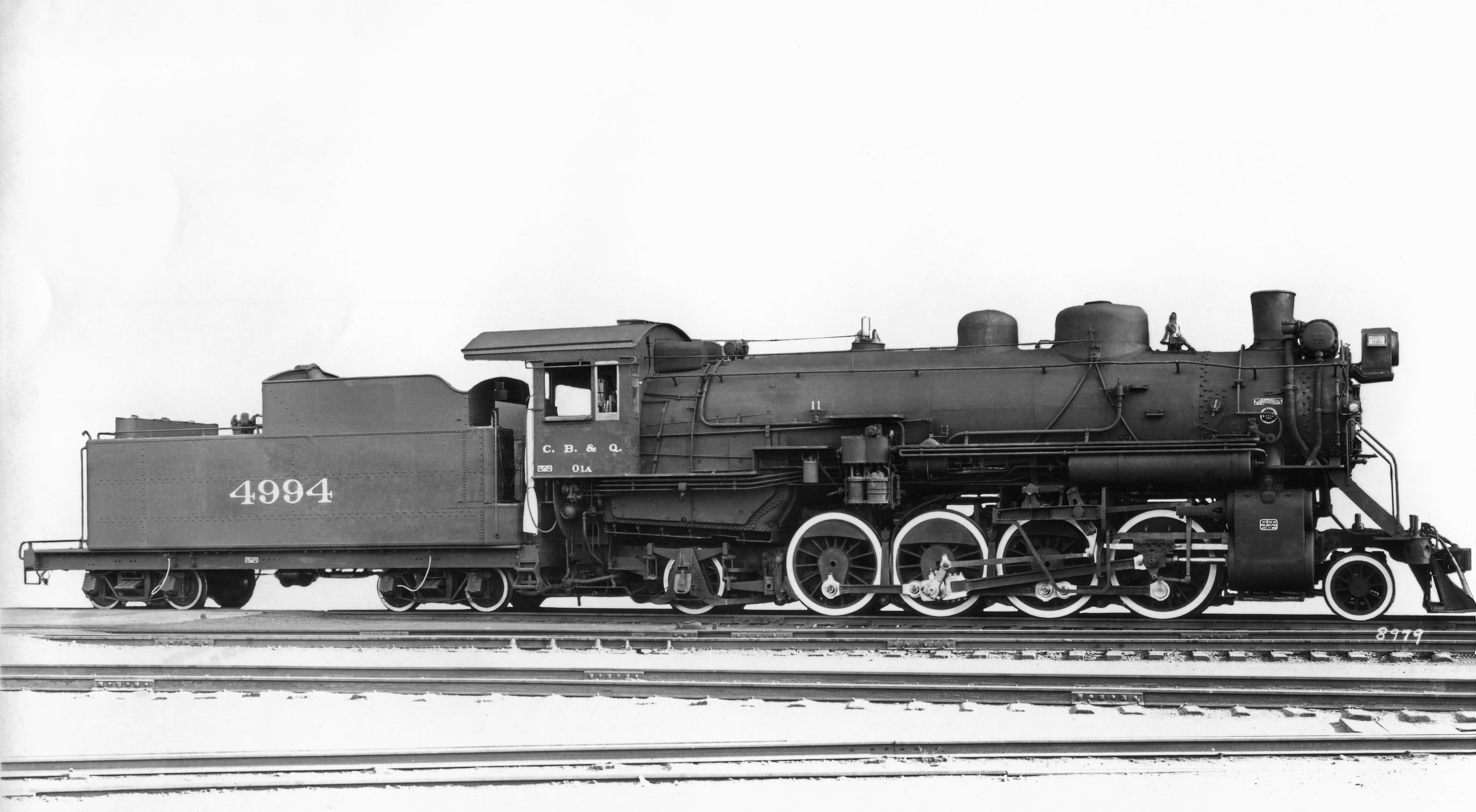
Builder's photograph of fellow CB&Q O-1A No. 4994 in 1923

Throughout the 1910s, the Chicago, Burlington and Quincy (CB&Q) Railroad ordered a fleet of 2-8-2 "Mikado" locomotives from the Baldwin Locomotive Works of Philadelphia, Pennsylvania, for use in general freight service. The first sixty 2-8-2s of the CB&Q (Nos. 5000-5059) were designated as the O-1 class. They were built with 64-inch (1,626 mm) diameter driving wheels, 27-by-30-inch (686 mm × 762 mm) cylinders, and a working boiler pressure of 170 psi (1,172 kPa), and they could produce 49,500 pounds-force (220 kN) of tractive effort. They could also travel at speeds faster than 60 miles per hour (97 km/h).

In 1917, the CB&Q made multiple alterations to the boiler design on the O-1, and they created a new class of locomotives out of it, designated as the O-1A. The O-1As were designed with radially stayed fireboxes and feedwater heaters, and their boiler pressure was upgraded to 200 psi (1,379 kPa), resulting in their ability to produce 58,090 pounds-force (258 kN) of tractive effort. The O-1As were lighter than the United States Railroad Administration's (USRA) Heavy Mikado design, but heavier than the USRA's Light Mikado design. The first eighty-eight O-1As (Nos. 5060-5147) were built between 1917 and 1922, and sixty locomotives (Nos. 4940-4999) were built in 1923. The final O-1As were numbered in the 4900-series to avoid conflict with the 5200-series assigned to the O-2 Class.

=== Revenue service ===
No. 4960 was constructed in August 1923 by the Baldwin Locomotive Works (BLW), as part of that year's batches of O-1A locomotives. In revenue service, No. 4960 was mostly assigned by the CB&Q to pull freight trains in the railroad's Chicago Division. After World War II, the CB&Q initiated a $140-million program to dieselize their locomotive fleet, with multiple steam locomotives being reassigned or retired from service. No. 4960 was reassigned to work in the Beardstown Division—the final division on the CB&Q where almost all locomotives assigned were steam-powered.

On the Beardstown Division, No. 4960 served as a mine switcher to pull hopper cars loaded with Southern Illinois coal out of Herrin Junction, Illinois, and it pulled coal extras between Herrin Junction, Beardstown, and Centralia. It also pulled local freight trains between Herrin Junction, Centralia, and Metropolis, and it traveled between Centralia and St. Louis via trackage rights over the Southern Railway (SOU). By late 1958, No. 4960 was one of the final O-1As to remain in active service at Herrin Junction, and the locomotive completed its final commercial assignments for the CB&Q that same year.

=== First excursion service ===
Beginning in 1955, the CB&Q hosted a series of excursion fantrips hosted by railfan clubs, including the Illinois Railroad Club, and they kicked off the CB&Q's new steam excursion program. In December 1958, No. 4960 moved from Herrin Junction to Chicago, in preparation to pull its first fantrip. The fantrip took place on December 28, when No. 4960 ran from Chicago to Galesburg, Illinois and return, and 490 passengers were on board the train that day. After the CB&Q discontinued commercial steam operations in January 1959, the railroad's president, Harry C. Murphy, commissioned for additional steam-powered excursion trains to take place. While the majority of the excursions in the 1950s were hauled by over twenty different steam locomotives, the excursions after 1960 would be exclusively hauled by No. 4960 and 4-8-4 "Northern" No. 5632.

On May 21, 1961, No. 4960 entered the Galesburg roundhouse to undergo a class 3 overhaul, and the work was completed on August 1. Following the success of the steam excursion runs, the CB&Q's passenger department began sponsoring the trips in 1962, and that same year, the railroad launched the Steam Choo-Choo excursions to educate school students about steam locomotives. Nos. 4960 and 5632 would pull the school trains across the CB&Q system, and Trains Magazine editor David P. Morgan proclaimed No. 4960 as The Great Teacher for the school runs.

Having hauled over 45,000 students in their trains by the end of 1962, the CB&Q continued the Steam Choo-Choo runs into 1963, when the railroad hauled over 75,000 students. On October 18, 1963, No. 4960 pulled a deadhead equipment train to Casper, Wyoming, in preparation to attend a special event, but en route, the locomotive smacked into the rear car of a passenger train in Douglas. The locomotive received only superficial damage upon impact, and the Casper shop crew quickly replaced the damaged headlight bracket on the smokebox door with a makeshift platform. On October 20, during the 50th anniversary of the CB&Q's entry into Casper, No. 4960 was spray painted gold and tasked to pull an excursion for 58 miles (93 km) between Casper and Arminto. Trains Magazine proclaimed No. 4960 as the Tenshodo Mikado for this event.

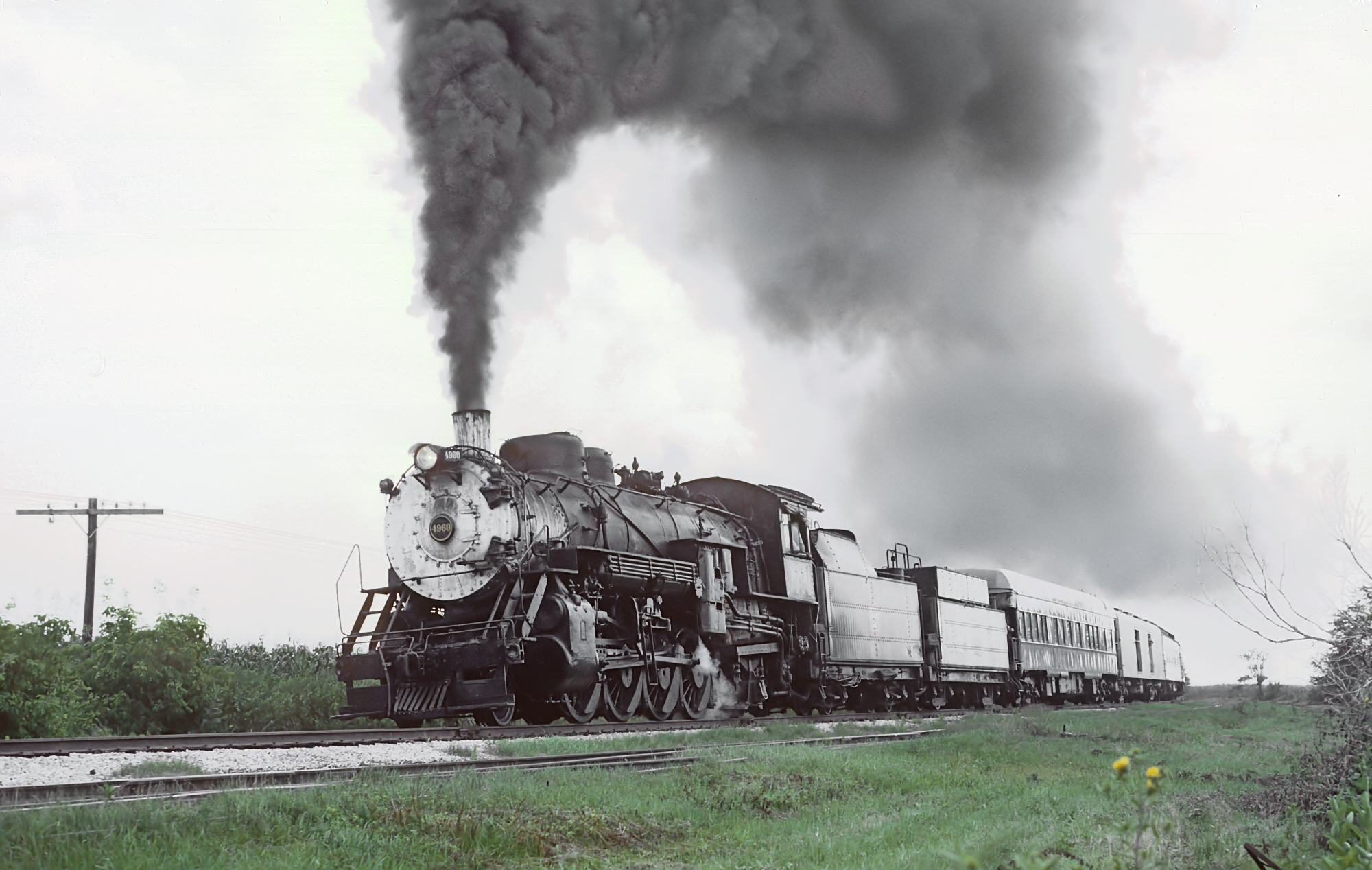
CB&Q No. 4960 pulling an excursion from Kings to Holcomb, Illinois, in August 1965

In 1964, the CB&Q discontinued the Steam Choo-Choo runs, and Nos. 4960 and 5632 were relegated to running on limited dates. The railroad began to experience rising operating and maintenance costs for their steam locomotives, a number of experienced steam mechanics had left, and having the locomotives refueled and watered in a dieselized environment was becoming difficult. In late 1964, No. 5632 was removed from service to undergo an overhaul, and No. 4960 subsequently continued to run for the diminished steam program on borrowed time. In April 1965, No. 4960 was stationed in Savanna, Illinois to pull revenue passenger and freight trains through a flood from the nearby Mississippi River. On July 1 that same year, the locomotive was selected to pull the first annual Schlitz Circus World Museum (CWM) train on the Chicago and North Western (C&NW) mainline between Baraboo and Milwaukee, Wisconsin.

Also on July 1, Harry Murphy retired from his position as president of the CB&Q, and he was succeeded by Louis W. Menk. Louis Menk explored ways to reduce operating costs for the railroad, and in doing so, he decided to shut down the steam program. No. 4960's flue time was set to expire on August 1, 1966, and it had been expected that the locomotive would receive a flue extension to run another year, but Menk decided against it. Throughout 1966, No. 4960 pulled some final excursion runs throughout Illinois, and on June 30, it pulled the second annual Schlitz CWM train between Baraboo and Milwaukee. On July 17, No. 4960 pulled the CB&Q's very last steam excursion train, labeled the Denrock Zephyr, between Chicago and Denrock, Illinois, and it officially marked the end of the CB&Q's steam program.

=== Retirement and second excursion service ===
Following the end of the program, the CB&Q donated No. 4960 to the State Historical Society of Wisconsin (SHSW), the owner of the CWM in Baraboo, and the society was required to agree to keep No. 4960 in its CB&Q livery. The donation was for the locomotive to become a permanent addition to the CWM's collection, but a light-duty bridge prevented No. 4960 from entering the Baraboo property. The SHSW subsequently asked the nearby Mid-Continent Railway Museum (MCRY) of North Freedom, Wisconsin to store No. 4960 for them, and the locomotive moved to North Freedom under its power on July 29. The following day, No. 4960 was fired up and moved within the museum's yard; it was the only time No. 4960 ever ran at the MCRY.

Following the expiration of No. 4960's flue time, the locomotive required an overhaul, but the CWM did not have qualified employees to perform the work. The CWM subsequently relied on locomotives from other owners to pull its yearly train instead, beginning with Grand Trunk Western 5629 in 1967. In October 1970, the SHSW donated No. 4960 to Mid-Continent, and the museum agreed to keep the locomotive in its CB&Q appearance. The museum was unable to use the locomotive on their light-weight trackage, due to its heavy weight, so for a number of years, No. 4960 sat idle in the MCRY's yard.

In 1979, the Lonesome Pine Recreation Corporation, led by Harold Keene, acquired the Southern Railway's abandoned 29.6-mile (48 km) route between Bristol and Moccasin Gap, Virginia, with the intention of turning it into an enterprising tourist operation called the Bristol and North Western (B&NW) Railroad. In November 1980, Harold Keene entered negotiations with the MCRY about leasing No. 4960 for the Virginia-based operation. Despite multiple museum members being reluctant to let No. 4960 go, Mid-Continent agreed to loan the locomotive to the B&NW for ten years. The B&NW was mandated to agree to keep the locomotive in its CB&Q livery, during the lease. In January 1981, No. 4960 was moved out of North Freedom and shipped on the C&NW and Conrail, bound for Jackson, Ohio.

Upon arrival in Jackson, the locomotive was moved inside the former Jackson Iron and Steel Company (JISCO) steel mill, where steam locomotive expert Gary Bensman was hired to overhaul and return No. 4960 to service. While the locomotive was worn out from running for the CB&Q steam program, Bensman and his team felt that it was in good enough condition for tourist service, and the B&NW crews opted to only operate No. 4960 at a working pressure of 150 psi (1,034 kPa), instead of 200 psi (1,379 kPa). Restoration work was completed on March 1, and No. 4960 was moved to B&NW property later that month.

No. 4960 began pulling the B&NW's three-car tourist trains on summer weekends within the eastern end of the route between Bristol and Benham. Along the route, the locomotive had to climb a steep 3%-grade from Bristol to Haskell. By the end of 1981, the B&NW had hauled over 10,000 passengers, but the state of the economy and a slump in the coal industry resulted in a lack of B&NW trains being run in 1982 and 1983. Concerned about No. 4960's prolonged inactivity, one B&NW volunteer, Robert Franzen, convinced Keene to allow him and other volunteers to repair and operate No. 4960 on the B&NW for some weekends in the fall of 1984. Prior to that time, Keene had informed Mid-Continent that the B&NW could no longer run the locomotive, but following Franzen's efforts, Keene changed his mind and attempted to plan for the B&NW to resume operations in 1985.

Concurrently, a non-profit group from the Quad Cities area, S&W Tourist Enterprises, expressed interest in leasing and operating No. 4960 for a higher price, and so the MCRY terminated the B&NW's lease. In March 1985, No. 4960 moved to the B&NW-Norfolk Southern (NS) interchange in Bristol, and it was later towed westbound to New Haven, Indiana. In New Haven, the locomotive was moved to a shop within Casad Industrial Park, where Gary Bensman based his Diversified Rail Services contracting firm, allowing him to simultaneously work on both No. 4960 and the nearby Fort Wayne Railroad Historical Society's (FWRHS) locomotive, Nickel Plate Road 765. S&W hired Bensman to overhaul the locomotive to comply with Federal Railroad Administration (FRA) standards, but by the time the move to New Haven was completed, S&W had disappeared for unknown reasons, so the MCRY contracted Bensman to clean No. 4960 to attract another lessor or a buyer.

=== Grand Canyon Railway ownership ===
In early 1989, the Santa Fe Railway's abandoned 64-mile (103 km) route between Williams, Arizona and the South Rim of the Grand Canyon was being redeveloped into a passenger excursion operation, called the Grand Canyon Railway (GCR), under the leadership of Max and Thelma Biegert. GCR's goal was to utilize steam locomotives for their operations, and after multiple options were mulled, including a group of American-built China Railways KD7s, the railway acquired four Ex-Lake Superior and Ishpeming (LS&I) 2-8-0 "Consolidations" (Nos. 18, 19, 20, and 29) in July 1989. Gary Bensman, who was hired as GCR's Chief Mechanical Officer (CMO) during the company's first year, remembered No. 4960 and informed Max Biegert that it was also available and suitable for GCR's requirements. The railway subsequently reached an agreement with the MCRY, and GCR purchased No. 4960 on September 16—one day before No. 18 pulled their first train.

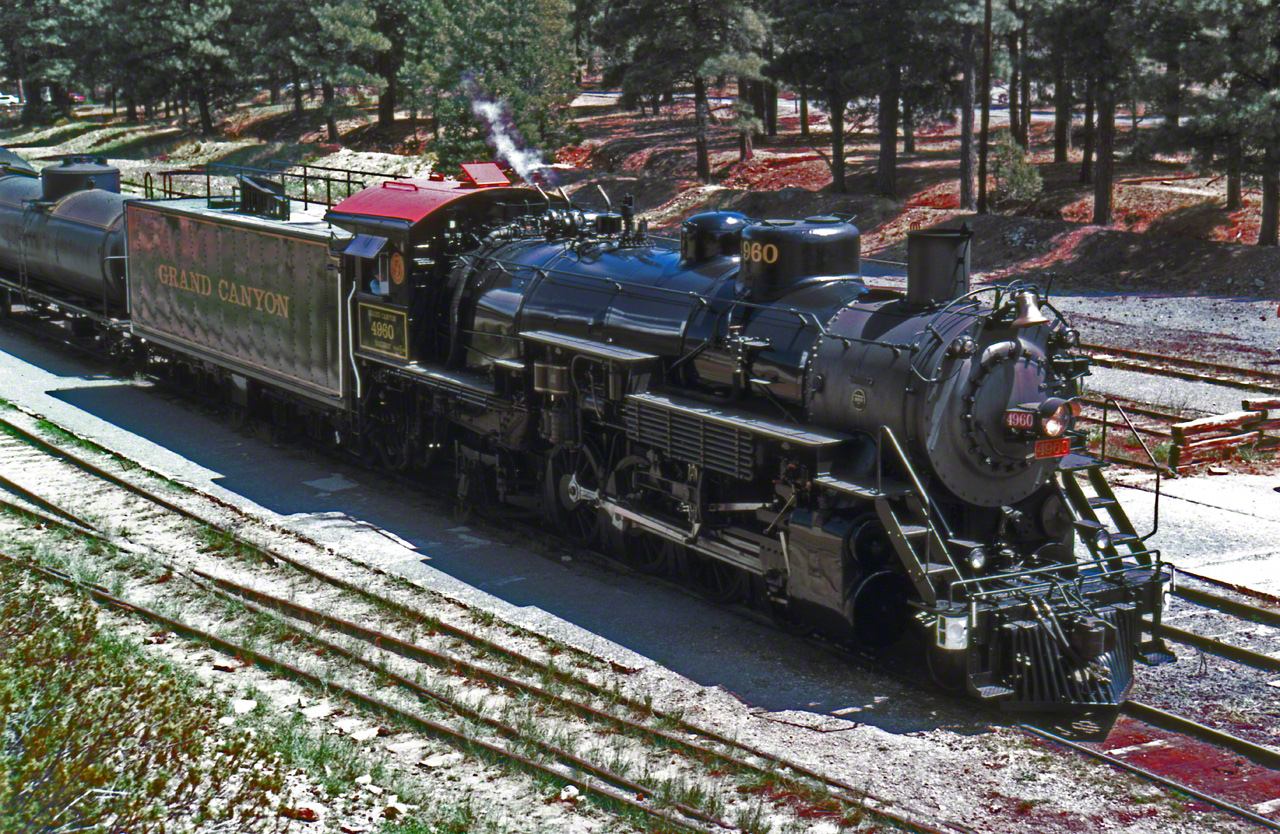
GCR No. 4960 idling at the South Rim of the Grand Canyon in the 1990s

The original plans for No. 4960's restoration were to have it retain its CB&Q livery—with a new tender being installed—and to enter service for GCR by July 4, 1990, before gradually receiving mechanical improvements in ensuing years. With Gary Bensman relocating his contracting shop, a group of GCR workforces led by Robert Franzen began to prepare No. 4960 to be moved out of Casad Industrial Park, but NS informed them that they would not ship the locomotive, due to pits being discovered in its axles. All of No. 4960's wheels were removed and shipped to NS' workshop in Irondale, Alabama to be reworked. Further unexpected problems with the axles and wheels led to repairs on them taking a number of months to complete. The owners of Casad became impatient about the wheel-less 4960's prolonged storage status in New Haven, so they later threatened to scrap the locomotive, if GCR did not remove it within thirty days. As a last resort, Franzen and his crew opted to cut the boiler from the frame to ship No. 4960 in separate pieces via flatcars to Williams, and the original smokebox was consequently damaged beyond salvaging.

Restoration work on No. 4960 for GCR officially began in the fall of 1993, and Franzen, who succeeded Bensman as GCR's CMO, was to lead the process. The shopforces of GCR were determined that when restored, No. 4960 would pull more cars than Nos. 18 and 29 could, and Franzen opted to give the locomotive a full-fledged rebuild to allow it to run for many miles with minimal required maintenance. The part of the locomotive that was the most extensively-reconditioned was the boiler; all of the flues, tubes, both flue sheets, parts of the firebox, and nearly the entire cab were replaced with newly-fabricated duplicates. The boiler also received mechanical upgrades No. 4960 did not previously have, including the addition of eight transverse arch tubes inside the firebox, and a slightly smaller custom-made smokebox.

The shopforces also opted to replace the locomotive's original CB&Q tender, since it was in poor condition, and its small capacity was deemed unsuitable for a full round trip on the GCR. After looking into a half-dozen options, including one formerly from Cotton Belt 4-8-4 No. 814, GCR acquired a larger tender—formerly from Soo Line 4-8-2 No. 4012—from the Minnesota Transportation Museum, and they removed its coal boards and flattened the top for a Santa Fe-inspired cuboid appearance. The new tender boosted No. 4960's water capacity from 10,000 US gallons (8,327 imp gal) to 18,000 US gallons (14,988 imp gal), and with the locomotive being converted to burn heavy oil, and later diesel fuel, its fuel capacity was changed to 3,800 US gallons (3,164 imp gal) of oil. Many other modifications were also applied to alter No. 4960's mechanical performance and cosmetic appearance, including the addition of a boiler-tube cowcatcher and a center-mounted dual-beam headlight on the smokebox door. The crews decided to deviate No. 4960 from its original CB&Q appearance—which would be divisive among CB&Q enthusiasts—and give the locomotive a new livery to symbolize its status on GCR, and the end result bears a resemblance to locomotives from the Southern Railway and the Frisco Railway. (Note: Many of the repairs made to No. 4960 were inspired by Robert Franzen's experience on the Southern Railway steam program.)

At a cost of $1.6 million, the major rebuild on No. 4960 took thirty-months over a three-year period to complete. The project was temporarily slowed in 1995, when GCR focused on expanding their operations to an all-year schedule, with MLW FPA-4 diesels being placed into service and a hotel being constructed next to the Williams Depot, but work on No. 4960 resumed by the end of the year. In May 1996, No. 4960 was test-fired outside the shop, and two months later, on July 9, the locomotive emerged from the shop and performed its first test run. On July 27, No. 4960 pulled its first regular train for GCR between Williams and the Grand Canyon Village, and it led every subsequent GCR train by the end of September. The O-1A was able to pull nine loaded passenger cars on GCR without diesel assistance, and while it is capable of pulling more, the extra capacity would create greater wear on the locomotive while traveling at lower speeds at the steep 3%-grades leading into the Canyon. On the weekend of October 5–6, the Grand Canyon Chapter of the National Railway Historical Society (NRHS) hosted a series of photo charters to serve as No. 4960's formal GCR debut. In August 2002, No. 4960 took part in that year's NRHS Convention on GCR, with the O-1A performing a photo doubleheader with visiting locomotive Santa Fe 3751 and a tripleheader with No. 18.

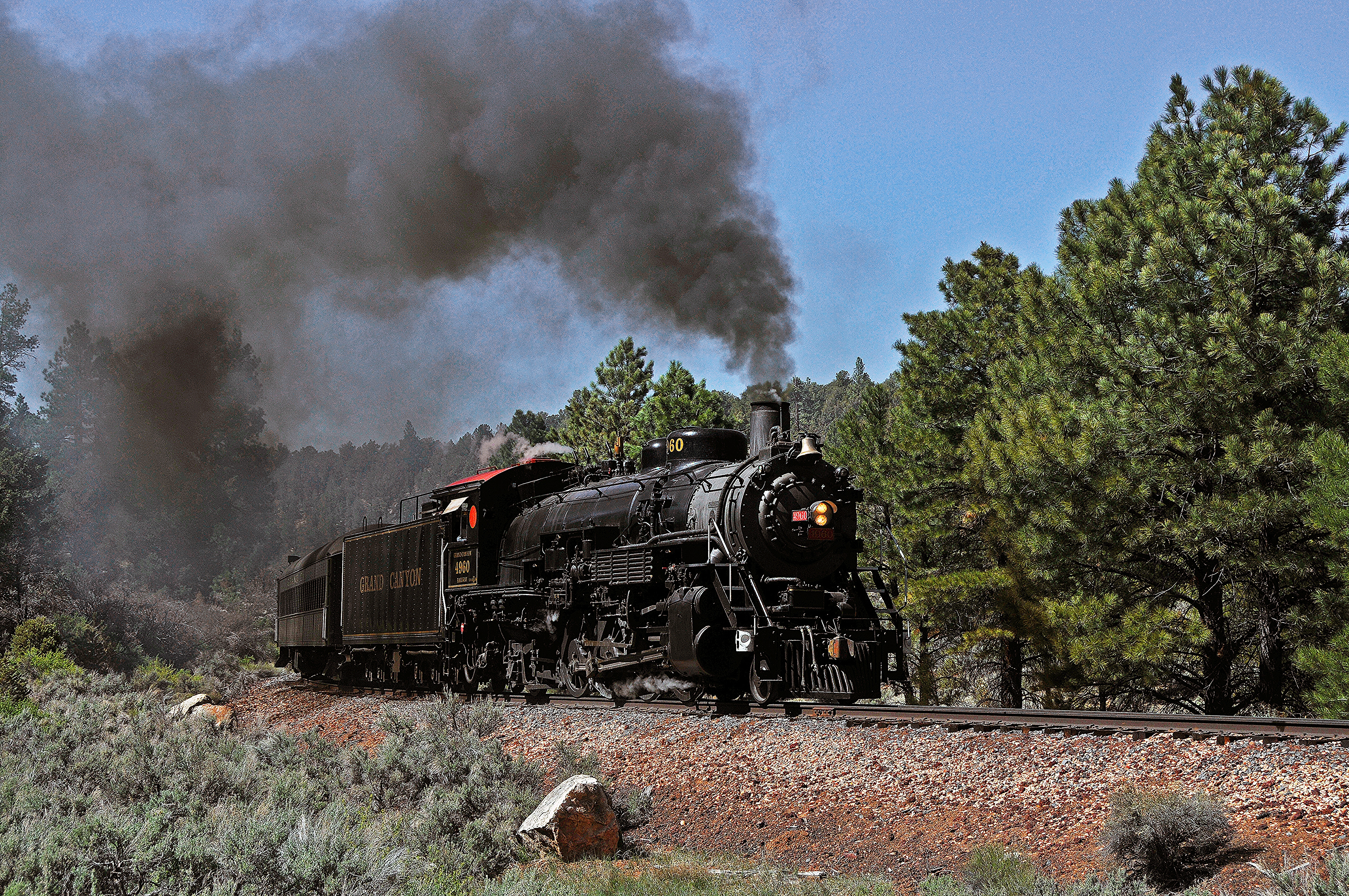
GCR No. 4960 pulling a photo charter train in Coconino Canyon, on May 15, 2011

In 2005, No. 4960's smokebox, along with No. 29's, were modified with a Lempor Exhaust System to improve the locomotives' draft. In 2007, No. 4960 received a Worthington SA type feedwater heater built and designed for a China Railways QJ Class 2-10-2. In late 2006, the Biegerts, whom had decided to retire, sold GCR to Xanterra Parks and Resorts. In early September 2008, Xanterra announced that GCR would discontinue all steam operations, since they had an ongoing commitment to minimize environmental pollution. They also cited that fuel prices had risen from the 2000s energy crisis, and Nos. 29 and 4960 would each use 1,450 U.S. gallons (1,210 imp gal) of oil for each round trip—more than twice the amount used by a diesel locomotive.

Following some backlash by railfans over the decision, GCR workforces decided to improve No. 4960's economic and environmental efficiency by converting it from burning diesel oil to burning recycled waste vegetable oil (WVO) outsourced from restaurants. The locomotive would be given the nickname the French Fry Express for the conversion, but according to GCR staff, as well as Trains Magazine editor Jim Wrinn, no food scents would be generated from the locomotive. GCR also began to outsource No. 4960's water supply from a rainwater collection system installed near the railway's shops. On September 19, 2009, during the 20th anniversary of GCR's grand reopening, No. 4960 was returned to service to pull one roundtrip, in dedication of the event. From that point onward, GCR resumed steam operations for limited occasions to save operating costs.

In September 2011, No. 4960 was removed from service to undergo a 15-year boiler inspection, as mandated by the FRA. The disassembly and inspection process lasted four months, with the O-1A's boiler passing the inspection with minimal required maintenance. On February 14, 2012, during the centennial of Arizona's statehood, No. 4960 lead the Arizona Centennial train on GCR, with 1,100 passengers on board the train that day. On May 16, No. 4960 performed another doubleheader run with Santa Fe 3751, when the latter visited GCR as part of a six-day mainline excursion.

By 2013, GCR set up a schedule for No. 4960 to operate on the first Saturday of the month from March to September. The locomotive would also be set to operate twice in April for Earth Day. On September 26, 2015, No. 4960 took part in a Man vs. Machine race, where it raced for 53 miles (85 km) against 260 bike riders from Tusayan to Williams. On April 23, 2022, following the passing of Trains editor Jim Wrinn, No. 4960's tender was painted with the message "Steam on, Jim Wrinn", with the locomotive pulling an Earth Day excursion in Wrinn's honor. On August 5, 12 and 19, 2023, No. 4960 pulled passenger trains for the centennial of the O-1A's construction date. On May 4, 2024, No. 4960 was temporarily outfitted with Southern Pacific 982's 5-chime whistle while pulling an excursion that would benefit No. 982's restoration.

On September 19, 2026, No. 4960 ran a doubleheader excursion with No. 29 in celebration of the railroad's 125th anniversary.

== See also ==
- Chicago, Burlington and Quincy 4000
- Chicago, Burlington and Quincy 4963
- Grand Trunk Western 4070
- Nickel Plate Road 587
- Southern Railway 4501
- Soo Line 1003

== Bibliography ==
- Bianchi, Curt (May 1995). "By steam to the Grand Canyon". Trains. Vol. 55, no. 5. Kalmbach Media. pp. 40–44.
- Bianchi, Curt (May 1997). "Steam's comeback kid". Trains. Vol. 57, no. 5. Kalmbach Media. pp. 35–42.
- Boyd, Jim (September 1982). "The Bristol & North Western: A Burlington Mike on the "Trail of the Lonesome Pine."". Railfan & Railroad. Vol. 4, no. 5. pp. 30–36.
- Hadder, Eric (May 2013). "Critical checkup for steam". Trains. Vol. 72, no. 5. Kalmbach Media. pp. 31–35.
- Mitchell, Alexander (September 2019). "Thirty Years of Growth and Change: Grand Canyon Railway". Railfan & Railroad. Vol. 38, no. 9. White River Productions. pp. 47–55.
- Moungovan, Tom (January 1997). "4960: A New Career for an Old Friend". Railfan & Railroad. Vol. 16, no. 1. Carstens Publications. pp. 28–33.
- Nelson, Bruce (2013). America's Greatest Circus Train (1st ed.). Heimburger House Publishing Company. ISBN 978-0-911581-64-5.
- Stagner, Lloyd (1997). Burlington Route Steam Finale. David City, Nebraska: South Platte Press. ISBN 0-942035-38-0.
- Stowe, J. A. (1966). The Northern and the Mike: A Tale of Two Locomotives. Illinois Railroad Club.
- Wrinn, Jim (May 2010). "Grand Canyon goes green". Trains. Vol. 70, no. 5. Kalmbach Media. pp. 26–30.
