= Chicago, Burlington and Quincy 5632 =

Scrapped CB&Q O-5B class 4-8-4 locomotive

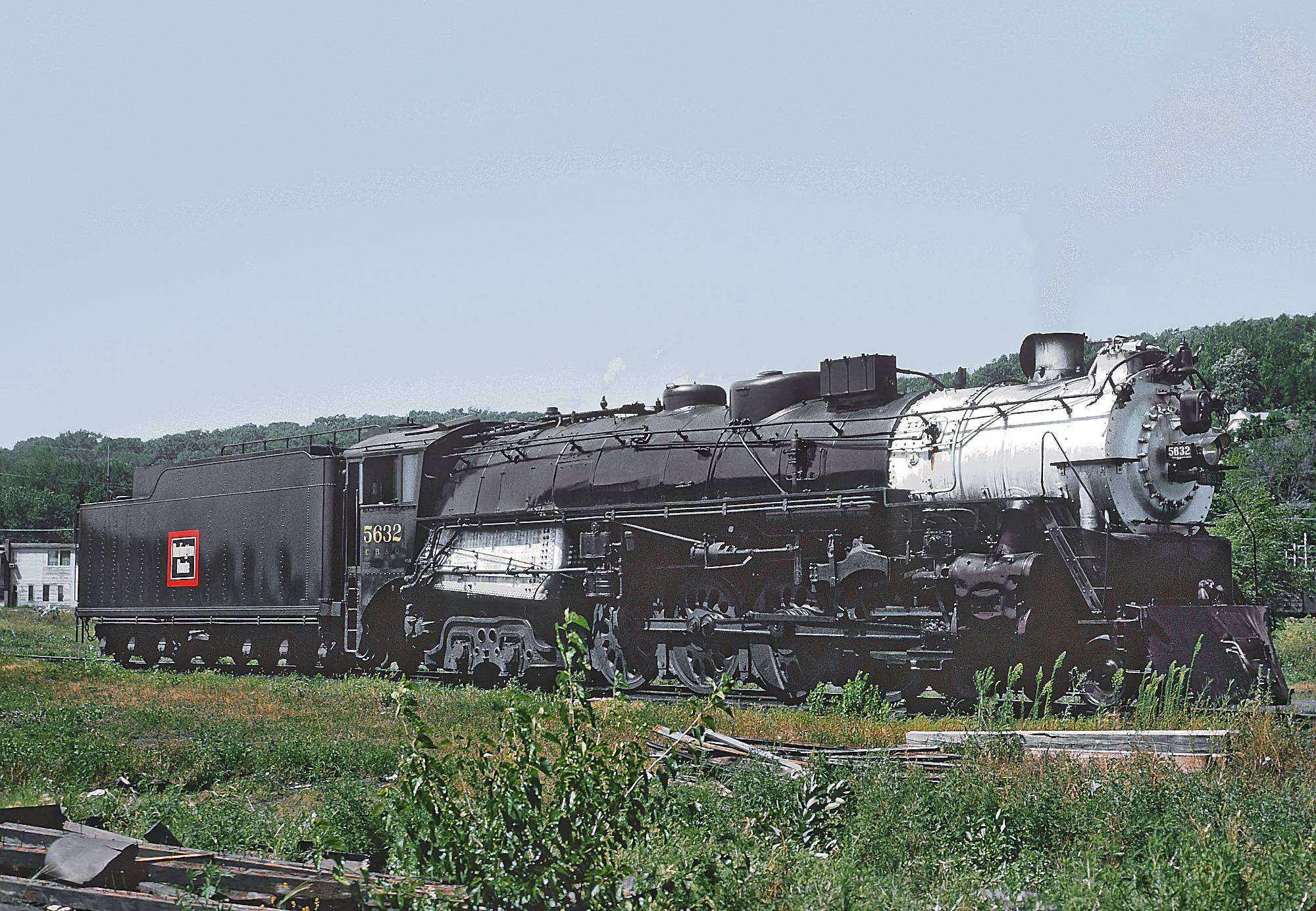
- No. 5632 idling in August 1964
Type and origin
- Power type: Steam
- Builder: Chicago, Burlington and Quincy Railroad's West Burlington, Iowa shops
- Serial number: 6610-7
- Build date: August 1940
Specifications
- Configuration
  - Whyte: 4-8-4
  - UIC: 2′D2′ h2
- Gauge: 4 ft 8 1/2 in (1,435 mm) standard gauge
- Leading dia.: 37 in (940 mm)
- Driver dia.: 74 in (1,880 mm)
- Trailing dia.: 43 in (1,092 mm)
- Wheelbase: Loco & tender: 90.69 ft (27.64 m)
- Length: 103 ft 3 1/8 in (31.47 m)
- Width: 10 ft 7 in (3.23 m)
- Height: 16 ft 2 in (4.93 m)
- Axle load: 69,757.5 lb (31,641.5 kg)
- Adhesive weight: 279,030 lb (126,570 kg)
- Loco weight: 474,620 lb (215,280 kg)
- Tender weight: 359,000 lb (163,000 kg)
- Total weight: 833,620 lb (378,120 kg)
- Fuel type: Oil
- Fuel capacity: 7,300 US gal (28,000 L; 6,100 imp gal)
- Water cap.: 18,000 US gal (68,000 L; 15,000 imp gal)
- Firebox
  - Grate area: 106.50 sq ft (9.894 m^{2})
- Boiler pressure: 250 lbf/in^{2} (1.72 MPa)
- Heating surface
  - Firebox: 433 sq ft (40.2 m^{2})
- Superheater
  - Heating area: 2,403 sq ft (223.2 m^{2})
- Cylinders: Two, outside
- Cylinder size: 28 in × 30 in (711 mm × 762 mm)
- Valve gear: Baker
- Valve type: Piston valves
- Loco brake: Air
- Train brakes: Air
Performance figures
- Maximum speed: Over 75 mph (121 km/h)
- Power output: 4,100 hp (3,100 kW)
- Tractive effort: 67,541 lbf (300.44 kN); 80,741 lbf (359.15 kN) with booster
- Factor of adh.: 4.13
Career
- Operators: Chicago, Burlington and Quincy Railroad
- Class: O-5B
- Number in class: CB&Q 5632
- Nicknames: The World’s Largest Brass Model
- First run: August 1940
- Retired: September 17, 1955 (revenue service); November 1, 1964 (excursion service)
- Restored: July 1957
- Scrapped: November 1972
- Disposition: Scrapped

Chicago, Burlington and Quincy 5632 was an O-5B class 4-8-4 "Northern" type steam locomotive, built in August 1940 by the Chicago, Burlington and Quincy Railroad's (CBQ) shops. It was used to pull mainline passenger and freight trains before it eventually became famous for pulling a plethora of excursion trains for the CB&Q's steam excursion program. By the time the program ended in 1966, No. 5632 was disassembled for an unfinished overhaul, and was subsequently sold to Chicago area railfan Richard Jensen.

The locomotive was moved inside a Chicago and Western Indiana Railroad (C&WI) roundhouse for restoration. In 1969, No. 5632 was evicted from the roundhouse and illegally moved to a scrapyard. Upon entry, the locomotive derailed on a curve, resulting in its scrapping in 1972 and a subsequent lawsuit between Jensen and the C&WI.

== History ==
=== Construction and revenue service ===
Between 1936 and 1940, the Chicago, Burlington and Quincy Railroad (CB&Q) constructed twenty-six O-5A class 4-8-4 "Northern" locomotives at their West Burlington, Iowa shops, and construction on No. 5632 was completed in August 1940. The O-5A locomotives were upgrades to the O-5 locomotives built by the Baldwin Locomotive Works in the early 1930s. No. 5632 was initially assigned to pull high-profile passenger trains and heavy freight trains throughout the Western portion of the CB&Q system; mostly throughout the states of Iowa, Nebraska, Wyoming, and Colorado. At some point in the early 1950s, No. 5632 became one of six O-5A's to be converted to burn oil, as opposed to coal, and it was reclassified as an O-5B.

After the CB&Q dieselized their entire passenger fleet on September 26, 1952, No. 5632 was among several O-5 class locomotives that were reassigned to haul freight extras in the CB&Q's Lincoln-Omaha divisions in Nebraska and Iowa. No. 5632 was one of the last steam locomotives to pull a revenue freight train on the CB&Q west of Lincoln, Nebraska, having pulled a train on September 17, 1955. The locomotive was subsequently put into storage in Lincoln, but in July 1957, all six of the O-5B's, including No. 5632, were removed from storage to pull additional freight trains in the Lincoln-Omaha divisions, in response to some diesel locomotives being transferred to serve that month's Nebraska wheat harvest.

=== Excursion service ===
In late October 1958, No. 5632 travelled light from Lincoln to Chicago, Illinois, and on November 2, the locomotive was tasked to pull a railroad-sponsored reenactment fantrip of the "Aristocrat" between Chicago and Galesburg. Over 1,100 passengers were on board that day. In the wake of the success of previous steam-powered fantrips, CB&Q president Harry C. Murphy—a steam fan who recognized the popularity in steam locomotives—authorized the CB&Q to operate additional steam-powered fantrips within the ensuing years. No. 5632 subsequently pulled some additional fantrips for the railroad throughout 1959.

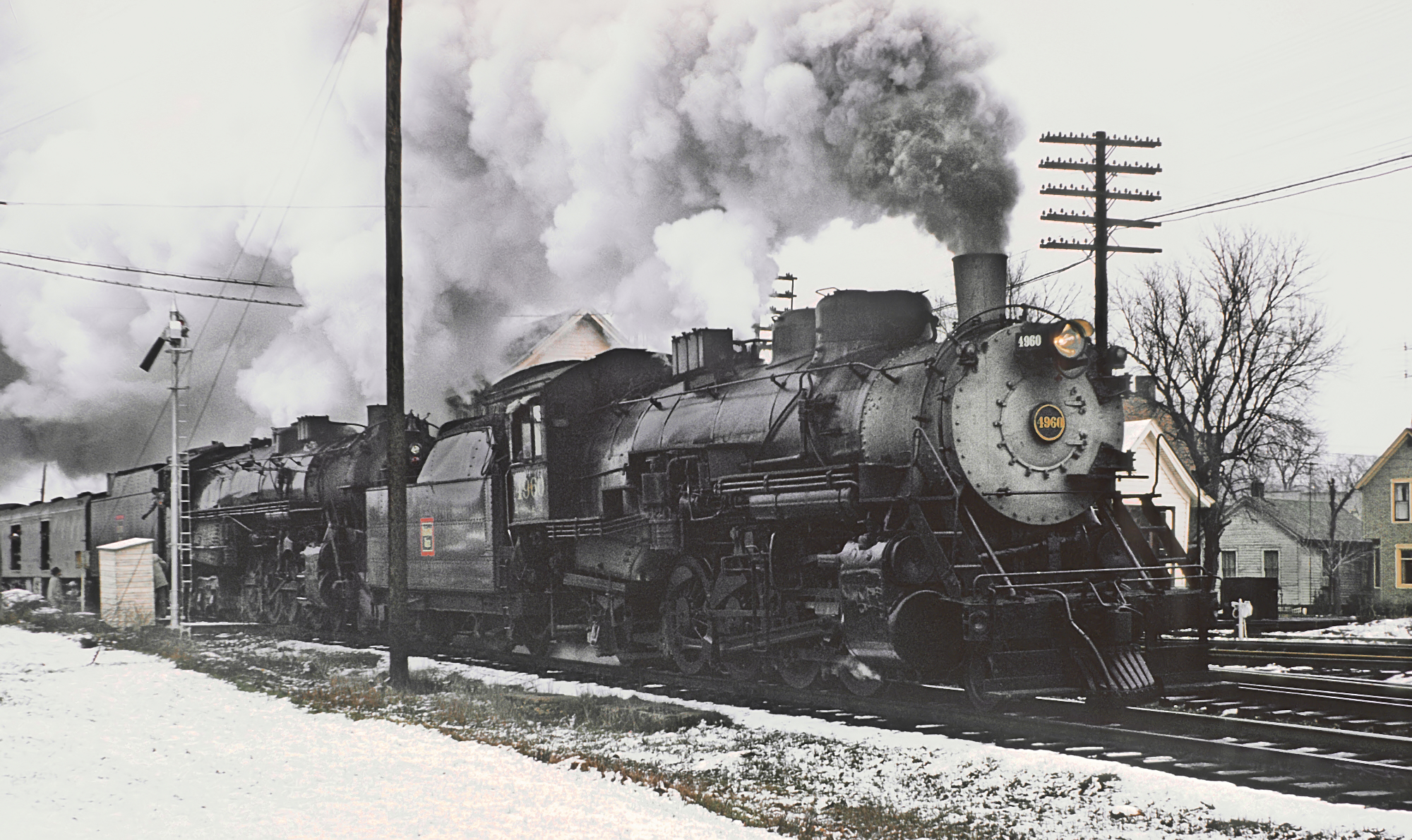
CB&Q No. 5632 pulling a doubleheader excursion with 2-8-2 No. 4960 at Mendota, Illinois, on April 1, 1962

Beginning on June 7, 1959, the locomotive pulled a multi-day fantrip sponsored by the Illinois Railroad Club, with the train running from Chicago to Lincoln, and fellow O-5B No. 5626 would then be used to pull the train from Lincoln to Denver, Colorado. While No. 5626 suffered an eccentric rod failure en route back to Lincoln, No. 5632 returned the trip to Chicago without incident. On September 6, No. 5632 pulled an eighteen-car excursion on the CB&Q's suburban mainline from Chicago to Aurora, Illinois, and upon arrival in Aurora, 2-10-4 "Colorado" type No. 6315 was coupled in front of the O-5B for a doubleheaded run to Galesburg. While en route to Galesburg, No. 6315 snapped an eccentric rod, and No. 5632 had to push No. 6315 while pulling the train solo for the remainder of the journey.

Throughout the 1950s, twenty-one individual steam locomotives were used to pull the CB&Q's excursion trips, but by 1960, only two of them were still operational; No. 5632 and 2-8-2 "Mikado" No. 4960. At the end of 1960, No. 5632's flue time was nearing expiration, but after a flue inspection took place in Galesburg, the Interstate Commerce Commission's (ICC) Bureau of Locomotive Inspection granted No. 5632's flue time a one-year extension. The ICC would grant the locomotive's flue time another extension in late 1961.

Also in 1961, No. 5632 performed a doubleheader with No. 4960 on December 7, between Chicago and Galesburg. By the beginning of 1962, the CB&Q's passenger department proposed to create a new approach to market the railroad's steam program by promoting discount ticket sales to non-railfans. To that end, the railroad created a new set of excursion runs, called the Steam "Choo-Choo", which would carry and educate school students from various communities. No. 5632 pulled such trips beginning on April 30, and it subsequently pulled several more excursion trains for the remainder of the year.

Following the success of the 1962 excursion trips, the CB&Q hosted additional runs for the Steam Choo-Choo events and the Illinois Railroad Club during the 1963 season. On August 26 and 27, No. 5632 pulled the "Intermountain Limited" excursion—sponsored by the Iowa Chapter of the National Railway Historical Society (NRHS)—from Chicago to Denver to take part in the 1963 NRHS Convention. The locomotive pulled the excursion over the Colorado and Southern (C&S) mainline in late August and early September. During that time, the excursion was transferred in Loveland to Great Western (GW) 2-10-0 "Decapod" No. 90, which pulled it over the GW mainline, until it was transferred back to No. 5632 in Longmont. No. 5632 returned the excursion to Chicago on September 7. On September 29, No. 5632 returned to the West Burlington, Iowa shops, where it was built, in commemoration for the 23rd anniversary of the locomotive's 1940 construction date, and it broke through a banner that covered one of the shop doors.

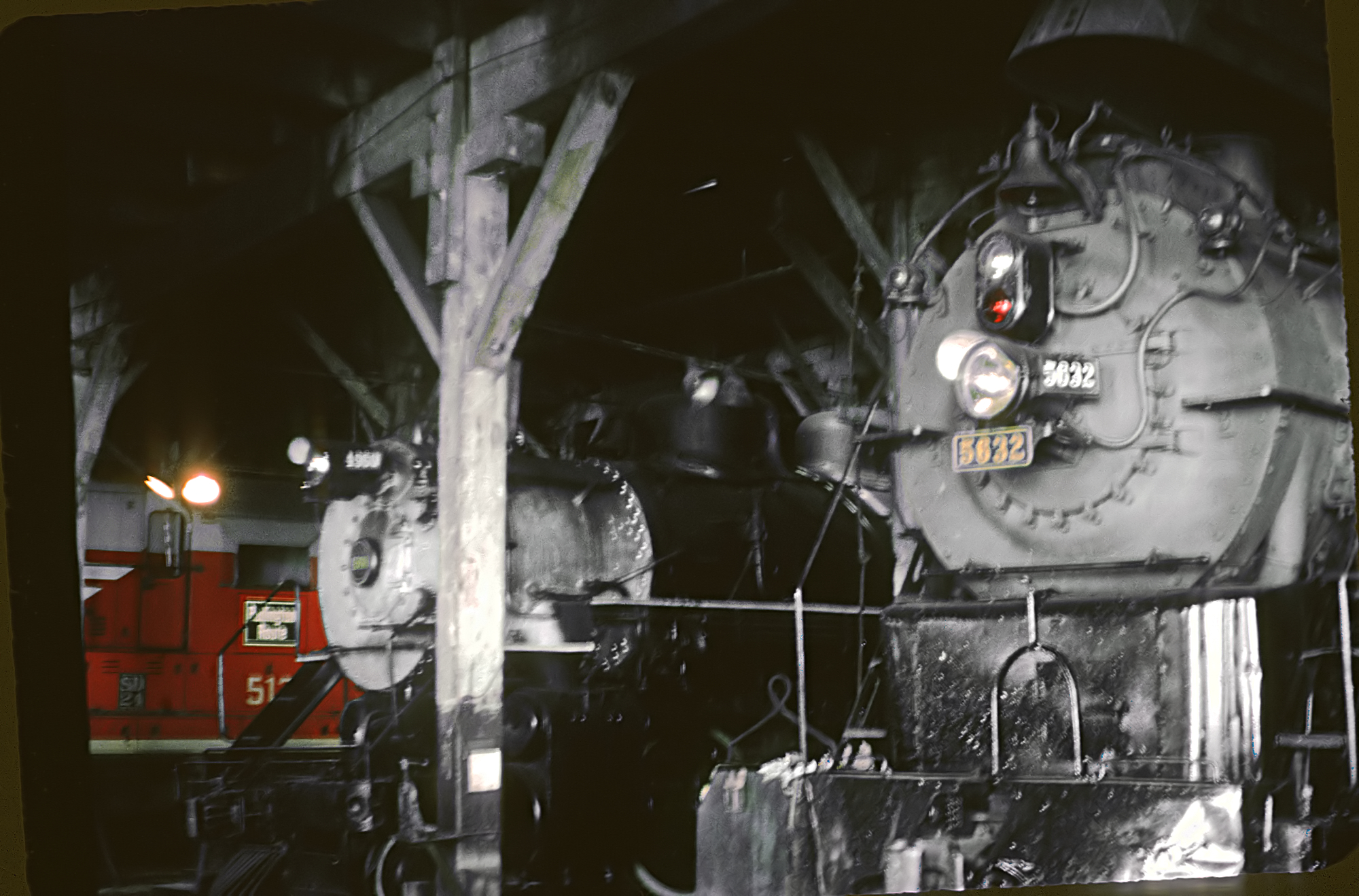
CB&Q Nos. 5632 and 4960 sitting in storage inside the Clyde Roundhouse, on August 22, 1962

During the 1964 season, the CB&Q dwindled their steam excursion operations while the Steam Choo-Choo trips were discontinued; the railroad began to face critical financial and mechanical challenges in continuing the program. In late May, during the 100th anniversary of the CB&Q suburban mainline between Chicago and Aurora, No. 5632 was painted in an all brass livery, and it pulled two commemorative trains on May 20 and May 23. The May 23 trip consisted of twenty-two bilevel cars and 3,500 passengers—the trip broke the record of the highest number of people carried in a single train, but the record was broken by other trains in later years, including one on the Rhaetian Railway in Switzerland. No. 5632 retained its brass livery for the 50th anniversary of the opening of the Kansas City Union Station on October 31 and November 1. The November 1 trip marked the last time No. 5632 operated under steam before its flue time expired; the ICC did not grant the locomotive any more extensions.

As a result of public demand to keep the steam program going, Harry Murphy ordered for a class 3 overhaul to take place on No. 5632; the locomotive was moved back to the West Burlington shops for disassembly. A minimum of fourteen workers were required for the overhaul to be completed, but the CB&Q struggled to hire enough qualified personnel to work on the locomotive, since remaining veteran steam mechanics have retired and passed away. The railroad spent $100,000 on acquiring newly-fabricated parts for use on No. 5632. On July 1, 1965, Harry Murphy retired from his position as president of the CB&Q, and he later died on March 4, 1967, following a heart attack at his home in Aurora. Murphy's successor, Louis W. Menk, had no interest in hosting steam excursion trains. While exploring ways to reduce operating costs for the CB&Q, Menk ordered for the steam program to be shut down by August 1, 1966, and for No. 5632's overhaul to be halted.

=== Retirement ===
Railroad Club of Chicago member Richard "Dick" Jensen negotiated with Menk and other CB&Q management to acquire No. 5632. Jensen managed to purchase it along with a collection of tools and parts that were to be used on the locomotive. He moved them to the Chicago and Western Indiana Railroad's (C&WI) 47th Street Roundhouse outside of Dearborn Station in Chicago for storage, having already reached a lease agreement with the railroad's president, Robert McMillian. Jensen planned to continue where CB&Q crews had left off at rebuilding No. 5632 and use it for his own excursion trains, and he relied on ticket sales from trains powered by Grand Trunk Western 5629 to fund the overhaul.

=== Scrapping and legal disputes ===
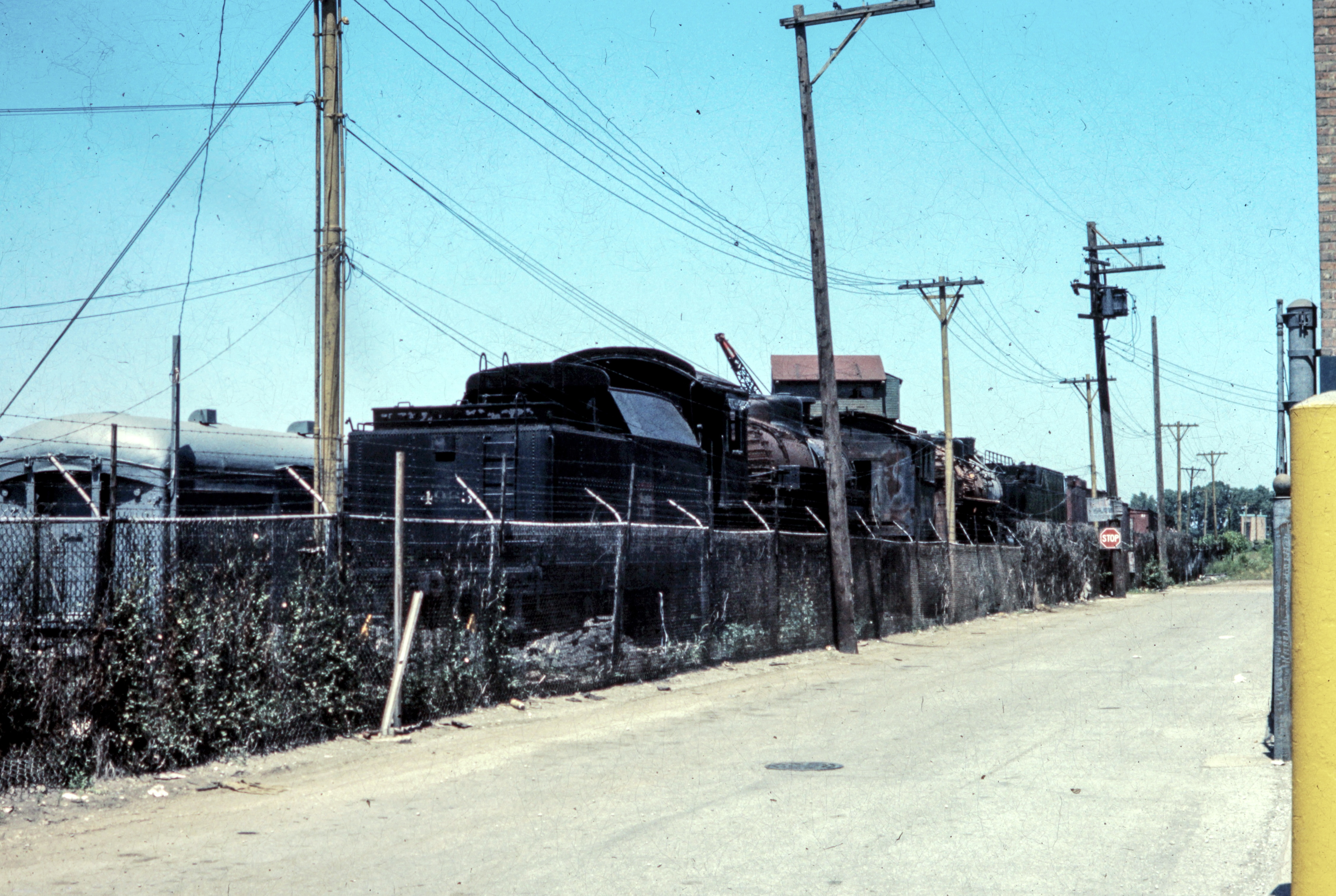
No. 5632 and 2-8-2 No. 4963 sitting inside Erman-Howell scrapyard, on July 22, 1970; two years before the former would be scrapped

In 1968, McMillan unexpectedly left the C&WI, and his successor, Robert Dowdy, decided to demolish the slowly-deteriorating 47th Street Roundhouse and to rip up the surrounding 51st street rail yard. On February 27, 1969, the C&WI sent Jensen a notice that he had to remove all his equipment from the roundhouse within thirty days, otherwise the railroad would assume ownership of the equipment and sell it for scrap; negotiations subsequently pushed the deadline to June 1. Dowdy also ordered for everything to be shipped in one trip. During the summer of 1969, Jensen made several arrangements to remove No. 5632, CB&Q 2-8-2 No. 4963, and his collection of parts off the property; it involved making plans to relocate them to either the Illinois Railway Museum (IRM) or the Chicago, West Pullman and Southern Railroad (CWPS), and he purchased some empty freight cars second-hand to load the parts and tools.

By the end of August, Jensen had his locomotives and parts removed from the building and coupled together in one consist for shipment. The following month, superintendents from the Chicago and North Western (C&NW) and the Belt Railway of Chicago (BRC)—two railroads that connected the C&WI to the IRM and CWPS, respectively—inspected the consist, but they declined to ship it, citing Nos. 5632 and 4963 were in a state of disrepair, and most of the freight cars were overloaded and in poor condition. The C&WI subsequently moved the consist themselves at 5 miles per hour (8.0 km/h) to their 83rd street yard to begin demolishing their roundhouse, and Dowdy ordered for all of Jensen’s equipment to be disposed of in one sale.

"Regarding our many conversations and communications demanding that you remove your equipment from Western Indiana premises. For your repeated failures to do so, effective at 12:01 p.m. September 25, 1969, CST, Western Indiana plans to sell as scrap to Erman-Howell Division of Luria Steel and Trading Corp. the two steam locomotives with tender, three tenders, one baggage car, one gondola car, two flat cars and one tool box car including all their contents which you brought upon the premises of Western Indiana. The proceeds of sale will be tendered to you. Therefore, if you do not yourself arrange for disposition of the foregoing equipment, prior to 12 Noon on September 25, together with definite and approved routing instructions, and assured route clearances, the sale as scrap will be made as planned."

— Robert Dowdy’s letter about No. 5632 and Richard Jensen’s other equipment; sent to Jensen on September 24, 1969.

On September 25, the C&WI sold No. 5632, No. 4963, and the freight cars of parts to the Erman-Howell division of the Luria Brothers Scrap Company for $5,800, and on October 2, with assistance from BRC, the C&WI moved the consist at 1 mile per hour (1.6 km/h) to Erman-Howell's scrapyard. Upon entry in the yard, No. 5632 derailed on a sharp curve, and its derailed state was only discovered sometime later by an Erman-Howell employee. The C&WI sent Jensen the $5,800, but he sent it back, and he made many attempts to re-purchase Nos. 5632 and 4963 from Erman-Howell for their scrap value, but the company refused to sell them. In November 1972, crews at Erman-Howell wanted to relocate No. 5632 within the yard, but they had no easy way to perform the task of re-railing the locomotive, so they dismantled it and shipped its remains to a nearby facility to be smelted down.

In early 1973, when Jensen learned about No. 5632's scrapping, he quickly filed a lawsuit against both Erman-Howell and the C&WI for illegal conviction of his property. Several court sessions followed, one of which included Erman-Howell being required to bring several locomotive parts and tools from the freight cars to court. Simultaneously, in 1974, the American Freedom Train Foundation offered Jensen $100,000 to restore No. 5632 for use in pulling the cross-country Bicentennial Train, but since the locomotive had already been scrapped, Jensen had to reject the offer. The C&WI later offered to pay Jensen $6,000 of lost scrap value with interest, but Jensen declined and asked for more. A subsequent offer of $150,000 was also declined. In December 1978, the court ruled that the sale to Erman-Howell was illegal and that the C&WI had to pay Jensen $707,302—the combined scrap value Jensen believed his lost equipment was worth—in compensatory damages and $1 million in punitive damages. The C&WI appealed the order, and a new settlement was pending until Jensen’s death in March 1991.

=== Legacy ===
No. 5632 had been one of five members of the CB&Q O-5 class to be preserved around the time of its scrapping. The remaining four preserved class members remain on static display at the following locations:

- No. 5614 at Patee Park in St. Joseph, Missouri.
- No. 5629 at the Colorado Railroad Museum in Golden, Colorado.
- No. 5631 at the Sheridan, Wyoming depot.
- No. 5633 at the Douglas Railroad Interpretive Center in Douglas, Wyoming.

== See also ==
- Chicago, Burlington and Quincy 4000
- Grand Trunk Western 6325
- Milwaukee Road 261
- Norfolk and Western 611
- Texas and Pacific 610
- Union Pacific 844

== Bibliography ==
- Stowe, J. A. (1966). The Northern and the Mike: A Tale of Two Locomotives. Illinois Railroad Club.
- Stagner, Lloyd (1997). Burlington Route Steam Finale. David City, Nebraska: South Platte Press. ISBN 0-942035-38-0.
