= Chicago, Burlington and Quincy 4963 =

Preserved American CB&Q O-1A class 2-8-2 locomotive

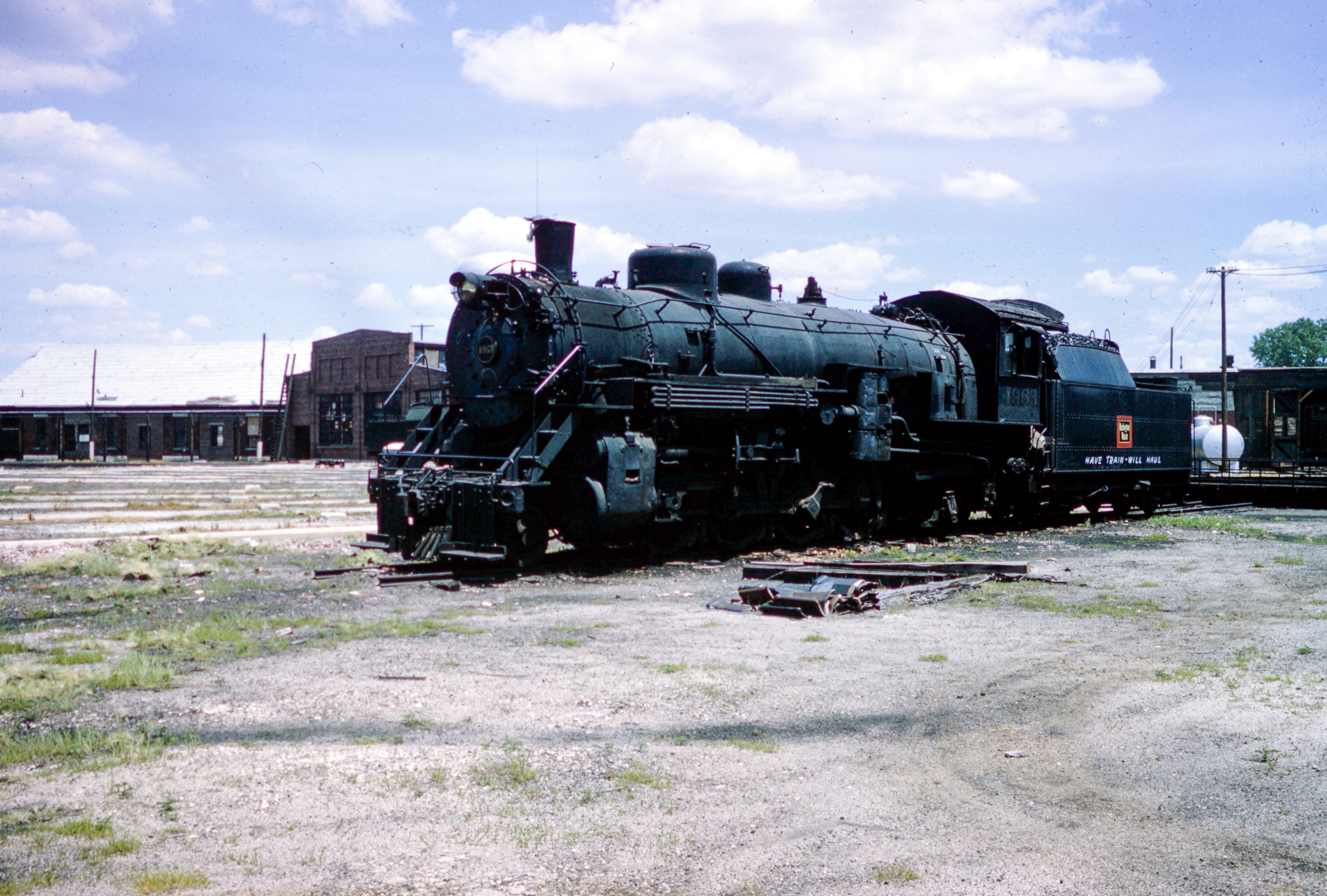
- Chicago, Burlington and Quincy No. 4963 sitting in storage at a Galesburg, Illinois roundhouse, in 1967
Type and origin
- Power type: Steam
- Builder: Baldwin Locomotive Works
- Serial number: 56812
- Build date: August 1923
Specifications
- Configuration
  - Whyte: 2-8-2
  - UIC: 1′D1′ h2
- Gauge: 4 ft 8 1/2 in (1,435 mm)
- Leading dia.: 33 in (0.838 m)
- Driver dia.: 64 in (1.626 m)
- Trailing dia.: 42 1/2 in (1.080 m)
- Tender wheels: 33 in (0.838 m)
- Wheelbase: 70 ft 0 in (21.34 m)
  - Engine: 33 ft 9 1/2 in (10.30 m)
  - Drivers: 15 ft 21 in (5.11 m)
- Height: 15 ft 10 1/2 in (4.84 m)
- Adhesive weight: 233,850 lb (106,070 kg)
- Loco weight: 310,780 lb (140,970 kg)
- Tender weight: 195,300 lb (88,600 kg)
- Total weight: 506,080 lb (229,550 kg)
- Fuel type: Coal
- Fuel capacity: 42,000 lb (19,000 kg)
- Water cap.: 10,000 US gal (38,000 L; 8,300 imp gal)
- Firebox
  - Grate area: 59 sq ft (5.5 m^{2})
- Boiler
  - Small tubes: 2 1/4 in (57 mm)
  - Large tubes: 5 1/2 in (140 mm)
- Boiler pressure: 200 psi (1,400 kPa)
- Feedwater heater: Worthington
- Heating surface
  - Firebox: 254.00 sq ft (23.597 m^{2})
  - Tubes: 2,179.00 sq ft (202.436 m^{2})
  - Arch tubes: 33.00 sq ft (3.066 m^{2})
  - Flues: 905.00 sq ft (84.077 m^{2})
  - Tubes and flues: 3,409.00 sq ft (316.706 m^{2})
  - Total surface: 4,178.00 sq ft (388.149 m^{2})
- Superheater
  - Heating area: 769.00 sq ft (71.442 m^{2})
- Cylinders: Two, outside
- Cylinder size: 27 in × 30 in (686 mm × 762 mm)
- Valve gear: Walschaerts
- Valve type: Piston valves
- Loco brake: Air
- Train brakes: Air
- Couplers: Knuckle
Performance figures
- Tractive effort: 58,090 lbf (258.40 kN)
- Factor of adh.: 3.85
Career
- Operators: Chicago, Burlington and Quincy Railroad; Bevier and Southern Railroad
- Class: O-1A
- Numbers: CB&Q 4963
- Retired: 1962
- Restored: 2016 (cosmetically)
- Current owner: Illinois Railway Museum
- Disposition: On static display

Chicago, Burlington and Quincy 4963 is a preserved O-1A class 2-8-2 "Mikado" type steam locomotive, built by the Baldwin Locomotive Works (BLW) in August 1923 for the Chicago, Burlington and Quincy Railroad (CB&Q). It was used by the CB&Q to haul mainline freight trains before it was leased to the Bevier and Southern Railroad to haul short-distance freight trains in the early 1960s. It was subsequently retained by the CB&Q and used as a source of spare parts before being acquired by Richard Jensen.

Jensen planned for No. 4963 to be restored to run again before it was sold to a scrapyard during legal disputes between Jensen and the Chicago and Western Indiana Railroad. No. 4963 was later purchased by the Illinois Railway Museum (IRM) in 1991, and as of 2026, the locomotive is on static display in Union, Illinois.

== History ==
=== Design and revenue service ===
Throughout the 1910s, the Chicago, Burlington and Quincy (CB&Q) Railroad ordered a fleet of 2-8-2 "Mikado" locomotives from the Baldwin Locomotive Works of Philadelphia, Pennsylvania, for use in general freight service. The first sixty 2-8-2s of the CB&Q (Nos. 5000-5059) were classified as the O-1 Class. They were built with 64-inch (1,626 mm) diameter driving wheels, 27-by-30-inch (686 mm × 762 mm) cylinders, and a boiler pressure of 170 psi (1,172 kPa), and they were able to generate 49,500 lbf (220 kN) of tractive effort.

In 1917, the CB&Q upgraded the boiler design on the O-1, resulting in a new class of locomotives being created; the O-1A. The O-1As were designed with radially stayed fireboxes and feedwater heaters, and their boiler pressure was upgraded to 200 psi (1,379 kPa), resulting in their ability to produce 58,090 lbf (258 kN) of tractive effort. The first eighty-eight O-1As (Nos. 5060-5147) were built between 1917 and 1922, and sixty locomotives (Nos. 4940-4999) were built in 1923.

No. 4963 was among the last O-1As constructed for the railroad in August 1923. No. 4963 was primarily used for hauling mixed freight trains for over twenty-five years. As the CB&Q acquired diesel locomotives to modernize the railroad's fleet, most of the O-1A's on the CB&Q, including No. 4963, were reassigned to switch and pull hopper cars of coal within the Beardstown Division in Southern Illinois.

The Beardstown Division was the final division on the CB&Q to be fully dieselized. In January 1959, No. 4963 was removed from service in the Beardstown Division, and it was put into storage in Galesburg, Illinois. In December 1960, No. 4963 received a major overhaul inside the CB&Q's roundhouse in Galesburg, and it was subsequently loaned to the Missouri-based Bevier and Southern Railroad (BVS) to operate alongside fellow O-1A No. 4943. The BVS assigned No. 4963 to pull coal trains between coal mines in Brinkley and the BVS-CB&Q interchange in Bevier.

In the fall of 1962, No. 4963 was removed from service on the BVS, when the CB&Q loaned an EMD NW2 to the railroad, and the O-1A was returned to Galesburg, two years later. At the time, the CB&Q was hosting a steam excursion program, and No. 4963 began serving as a spare parts provider for No. 4960, another fellow O-1A class locomotive. In 1966, the CB&Q's steam program was discontinued, and all of their remaining steam locomotives were sold off.

=== Private ownership and legal disputes ===
In 1967, Railroad Club of Chicago member Richard Jensen purchased No. 4963 to add to his growing locomotive collection. He moved the O-1A to the Chicago and Western Indiana Railroad's (C&WI) 47th Street Roundhouse outside of Dearborn Station in Chicago for storage, having already reached a lease agreement with the railroad's president, Robert McMillian. Jensen planned to restore No. 4963 to operating condition for use in excursion service, and he relied on ticket sales from excursion trains powered by Grand Trunk Western 5629 to fund its overhaul.

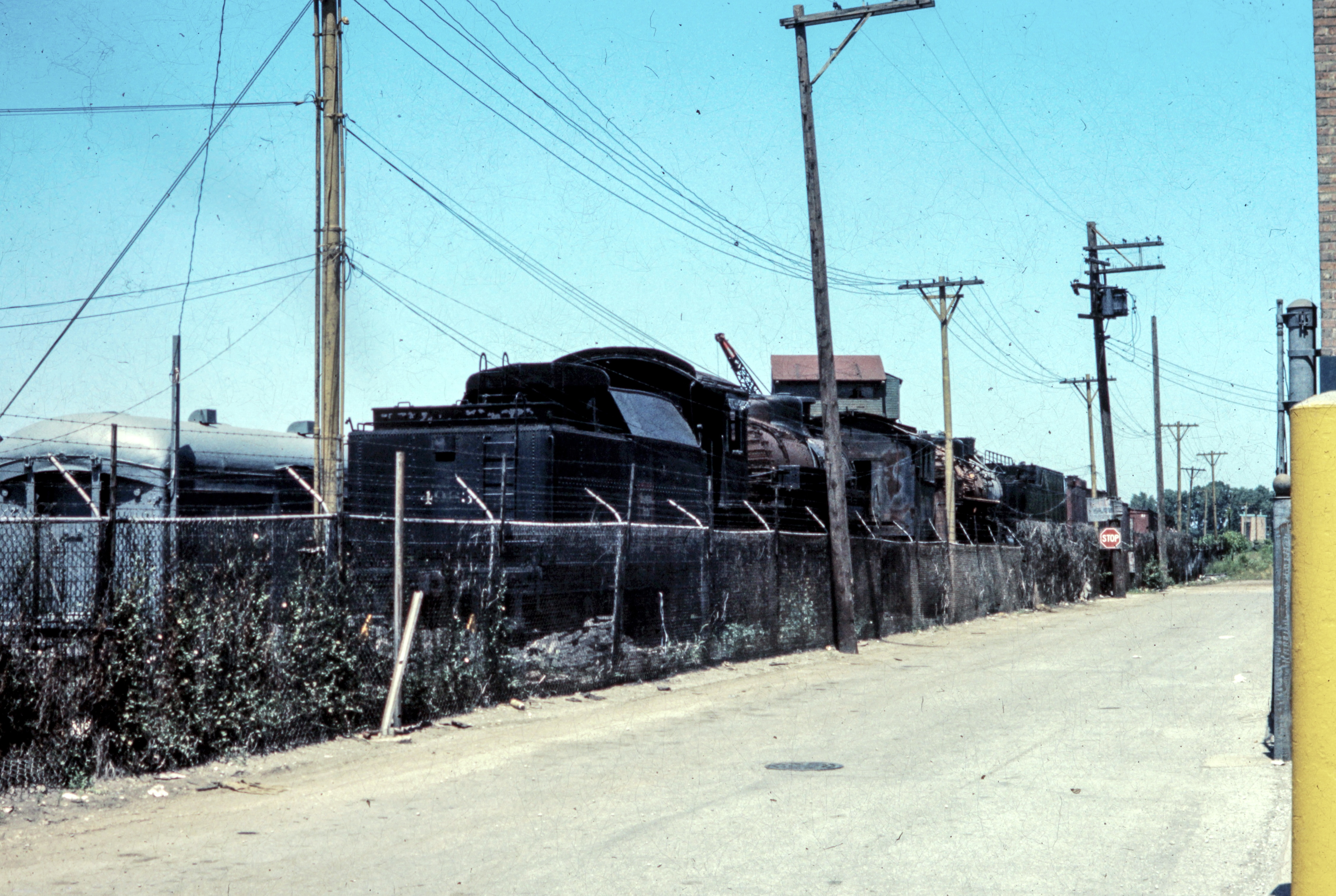
No. 4963 and 4-8-4 No. 5632 sitting inside Erman-Howell scrapyard south of Chicago, July 22, 1970

In 1968, McMillan left the C&WI, and successor Robert Dowdy decided to demolish the 47th Street Roundhouse and to rip up the surrounding 51st street rail yard. On February 27, 1969, the C&WI sent Jensen a notice that unless he removed all of his equipment from the roundhouse within thirty days, the railroad would assume ownership of the equipment and sell it for scrap. Dowdy also ordered for everything to be shipped in one trip. During the summer of 1969, Jensen made several arrangements to remove No. 4963, CB&Q 4-8-4 No. 5632, and his large collection of locomotive parts and tools off the property; it involved making plans to relocate them to either the Illinois Railway Museum (IRM) or the Chicago, West Pullman and Southern Railroad (CWPS), and he purchased some empty freight cars second-hand to load the parts and tools.

By the end of August, Jensen had his locomotives and parts coupled together in one consist for shipment, but they still remained in the 51st street yard. The following month, superintendents from the Chicago and North Western (C&NW) and the Belt Railway of Chicago (BRC) inspected the consist, and they concluded that it could not legally be shipped, since Nos. 4963 and 5632 were both in a disassembled state, and most of the freight cars were overloaded and in poor condition. The C&WI subsequently moved the consist themselves at 5 miles per hour (8.0 km/h) to their 83rd street yard, and Robert Dowdy ordered for all of Jensen's equipment to be sold off in one sale.

On September 25, the C&WI sold Nos. 4963, 5632, and the freight cars of parts to the Erman-Howell division of the Luria Brothers Scrap Company for $5,800, and on October 2, the C&WI and the BRC worked to move the consist into Erman-Howell's scrapyard. The C&WI sent Jensen the $5,800 check, but he later sent it back, and he made many unsuccessful attempts to re-purchase Nos. 4963 and 5632 from Erman-Howell for their scrap value. In November 1972, No. 5632 was scrapped, and Jensen subsequently sued the C&WI for illegal conviction of his property, while No. 4963 remained intact in the yard.

=== Illinois Railway Museum ownership ===
In the fall of 1990, the O-1A became scheduled to be dismantled for scrap. A proposition was made to the city of Chicago to acquire No. 4963 and restore it for use in pulling their own excursion trains around the area, but the proposition was declined, and the threat of scrapping returned. In early 1991, the Illinois Railway Museum (IRM) reached an agreement with Erman-Howell to trade five Ex-Northwestern Steel and Wire 0-8-0 switchers (Nos. 8306, 8328, 8372, 8375, and 8379) in exchange for No. 4963. The locomotive was subsequently moved to the IRM's property in Union, Illinois, where it was cosmetically repainted and put on static display with the rest of the museum's collection.

== See also ==
- Nickel Plate Road 587
- Grand Trunk Western 4070
- Baltimore and Ohio 4500
- St. Louis-San Francisco 1630
- St. Louis–San Francisco 1352

== Bibliography ==
- Stowe, J. A. (1966). The Northern and the Mike: A Tale of Two Locomotives. Illinois Railroad Club.
- Stagner, Lloyd (1997). Burlington Route Steam Finale. David City, Nebraska: South Platte Press. ISBN 0-942035-38-0.
