= South African Class 14C =

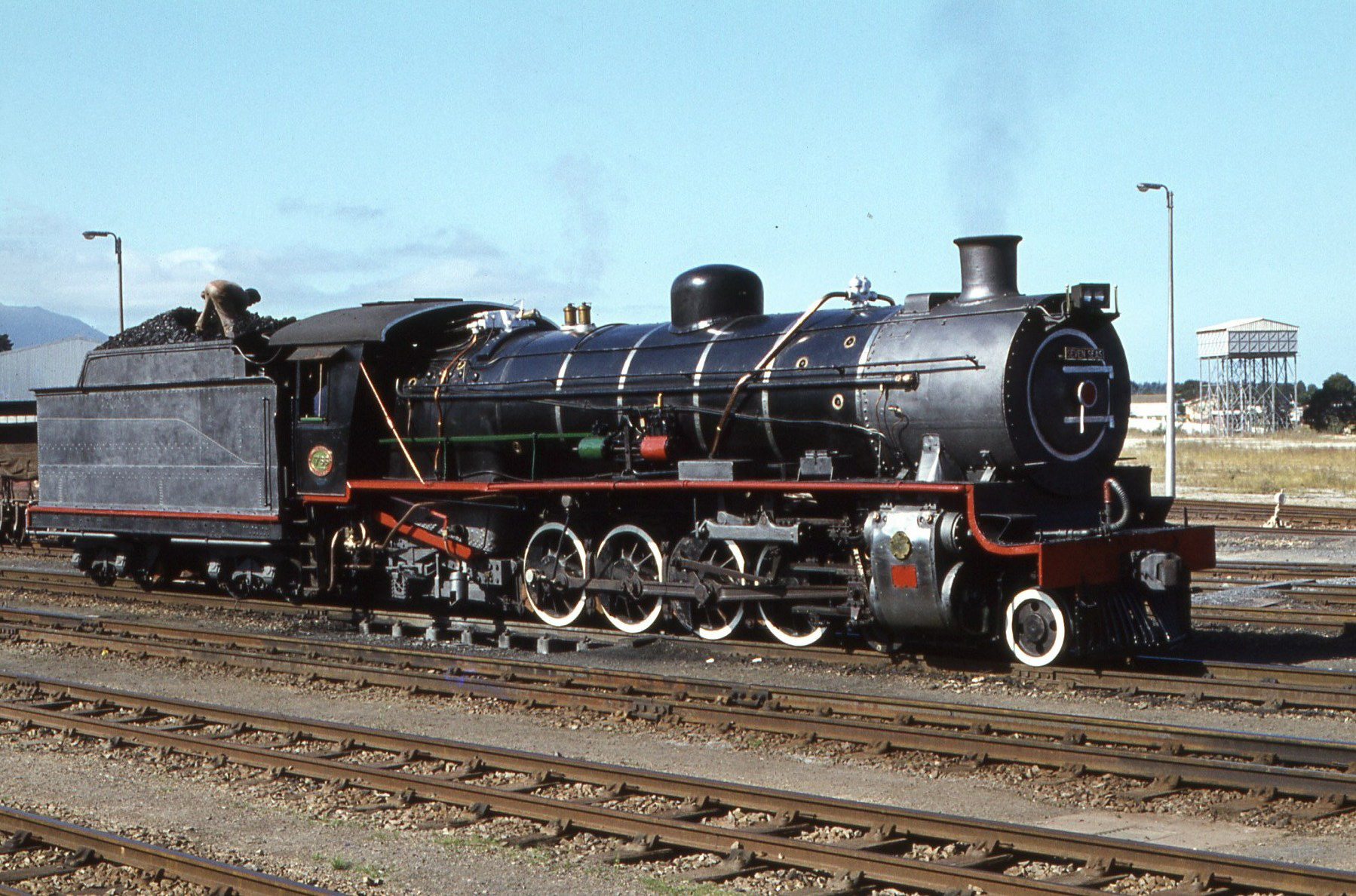
SAR Class 14CRB 4-8-2, 1st batch

The South African Railways Class 14C includes four batches of the same locomotive type, all initially designated Class 14C. Through reboilerings, rebalancings and cylinder bushings during its service life, this single class eventually ended up as six distinct locomotive classes with two boiler types and a multitude of axle load and boiler pressure configurations.

The locomotives were delivered in four batches from 1918 to 1922, all four with different engine weights and maximum axle loads.

- South African Class 14C 4-8-2, 1st batch (1918-1920)
- South African Class 14C 4-8-2, 2nd batch (1919)
- South African Class 14C 4-8-2, 3rd batch (1919)
- South African Class 14C 4-8-2, 4th batch (1922)
