= South African type LP tender =

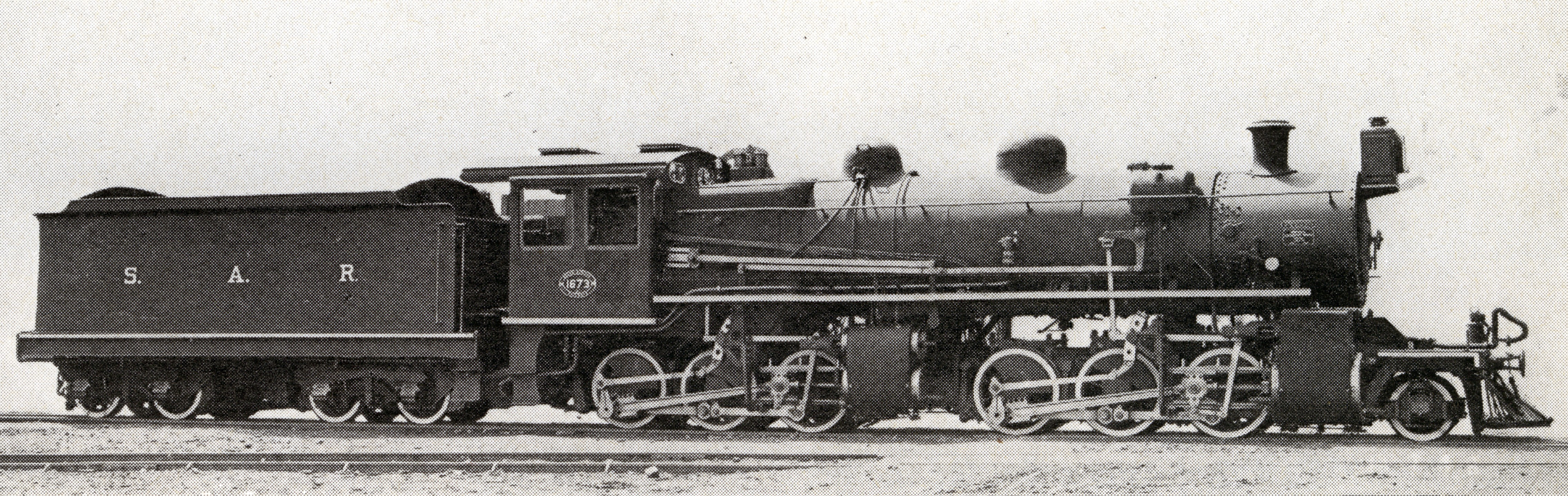
- Type LP tender on SAR Class MJ1, c. 1920
Type and origin
- Locomotive: Class 14C, Class 15B, Class MJ1
- Designer: Montreal Locomotive Works
- Builder: Montreal Locomotive Works
- In service: 1918-1922
Specifications
- Configuration: 2-axle bogies
- Gauge: 3 ft 6 in (1,067 mm) Cape gauge
- Length: 27 ft 1/4 in (8,236 mm)
- Wheel dia.: 34 in (864 mm)
- Wheelbase: 17 ft 11 in (5,461 mm)
  - Bogie: 4 ft 7 in (1,397 mm)
- Axle load: 12 LT 14 cwt 2 qtr (12,930 kg) av.
- Weight empty: 49,116 lb (22,279 kg)
- Weight w/o: 50 LT 18 cwt (51,720 kg)
- Fuel type: Coal
- Fuel cap.: 10 LT (10.2 t)
- Water cap.: 4,250 imp gal (19,300 L)
- Stoking: Manual
- Couplers: Drawbar & Johnston link-and-pin Drawbar & AAR knuckle (1930s)
Career
- Operators: South African Railways
- Numbers: SAR 1666-1673, 1761-1780, 1829–1838, 1881-1900, 1971-2010, 2026-2038

The South African type LP tender was a steam locomotive tender.

The Type LP tender first entered service in 1918, as tenders to the Classes 14C, 15B and MJ1 steam locomotives which were acquired by the South African Railways from Canada in that year.

== Manufacturer ==
Type LP tenders were built between 1918 and 1922 by Montreal Locomotive Works in Canada.

The South African Railways (SAR) placed eight Class MJ1 2-6-6-0 Mallet, 73 Class 14C 4-8-2 Mountain and thirty Class 15B 4-8-2 Mountain type locomotives in service between 1918 and 1922. The locomotives and tender were designed by Montreal Locomotive Works, to the specifications of D.A. Hendrie, Chief Mechanical Engineer of the SAR. The Type LP tender entered service as tenders to these three locomotive classes.

== Characteristics ==
As built, the tender had a coal capacity of 10 long tons (10.2 tonnes) and a water capacity of 4,250 imperial gallons (19,300 litres), with an average maximum axle load of 12 long tons 14 hundredweight 2 quarters (12,930 kilograms).

== Locomotives ==
Only the Classes MJ1, 14C and 15B were delivered new with Type LP tenders, which were numbered for their engines in the number ranges as shown. An oval number plate, bearing the engine number and often also the tender type, was attached to the rear end of the tender.

- 1918: Class MJ1, numbers 1666 to 1673.
- 1918-1922: Class 14C, numbers 1761 to 1780, 1881 to 1900, 1991 to 2010 and 2026 to 2038.
- 1918-1922: Class 15B, numbers 1829 to 1838 and 1971 to 1990.

== Classification letters ==
Since many tender types are interchangeable between different locomotive classes and types, a tender classification system was adopted by the SAR. The first letter of the tender type indicates the classes of engines to which it could be coupled. The "L_" tenders could only be used with the three locomotive classes with which they were delivered.

The second letter indicates the tender's water capacity. The "_P" tenders had a capacity of 4,250 imperial gallons (19,300 litres; 5,100 US gallons).

== Modifications ==
Most of these tenders were later modified by shortening and raising the upper sides of the coal bunker, in effect making the coal at the rear of the bunker more easily accessible to the stoker and apparently without affecting the tender's coal capacity.

== Illustration ==
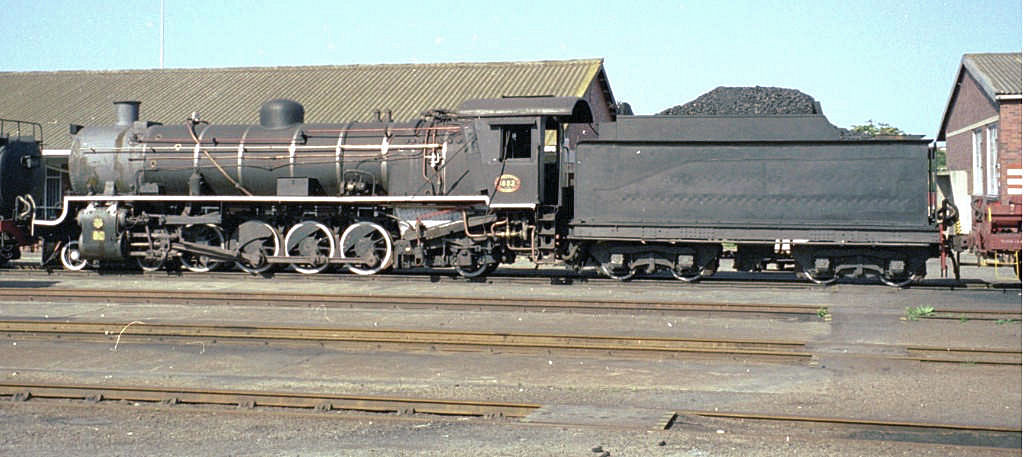
Modified Type LP on Class 14CRB no. 1882, 1997

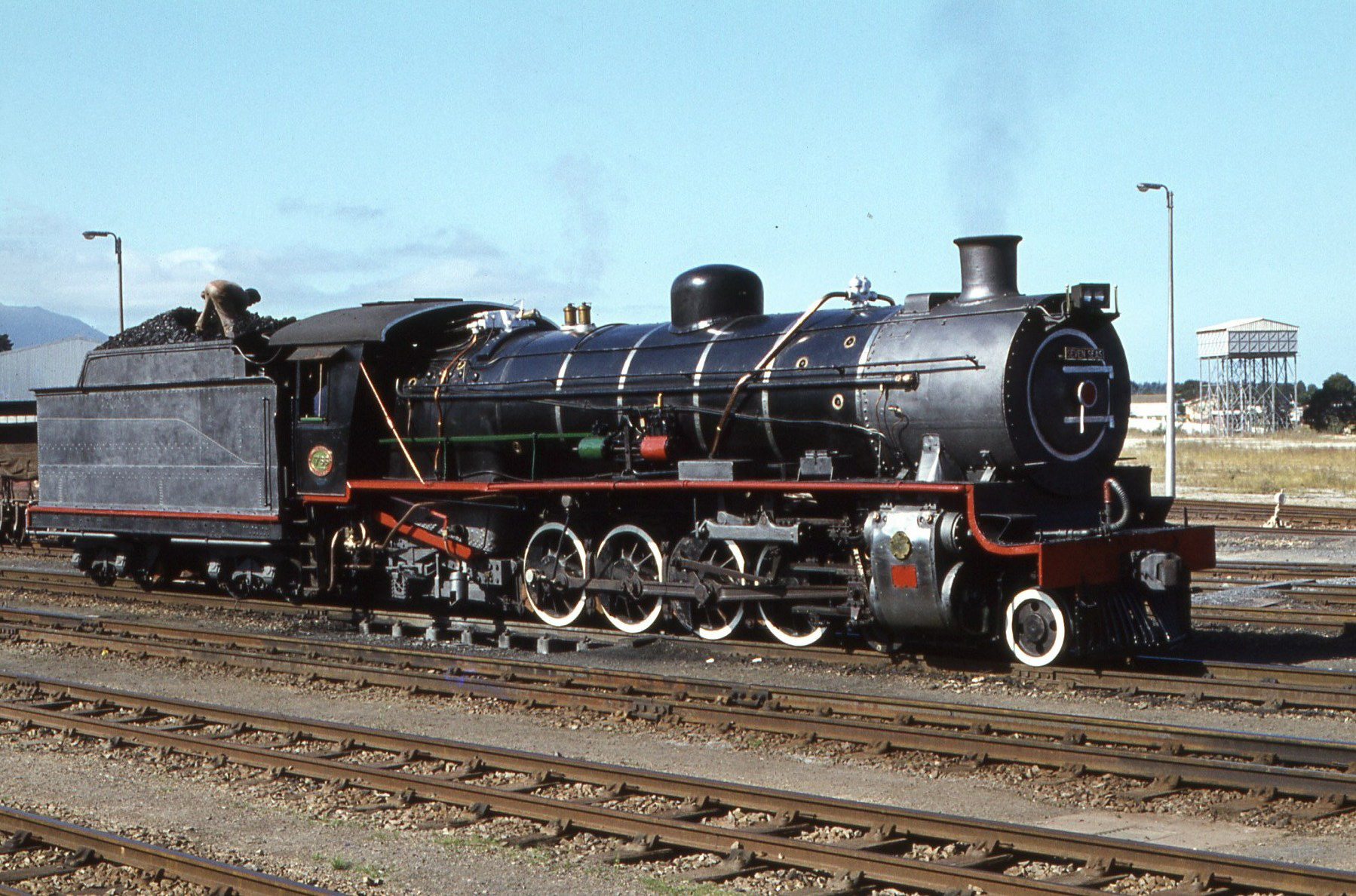
Modified Type LP on Class 14CRB no. 1766, 1979

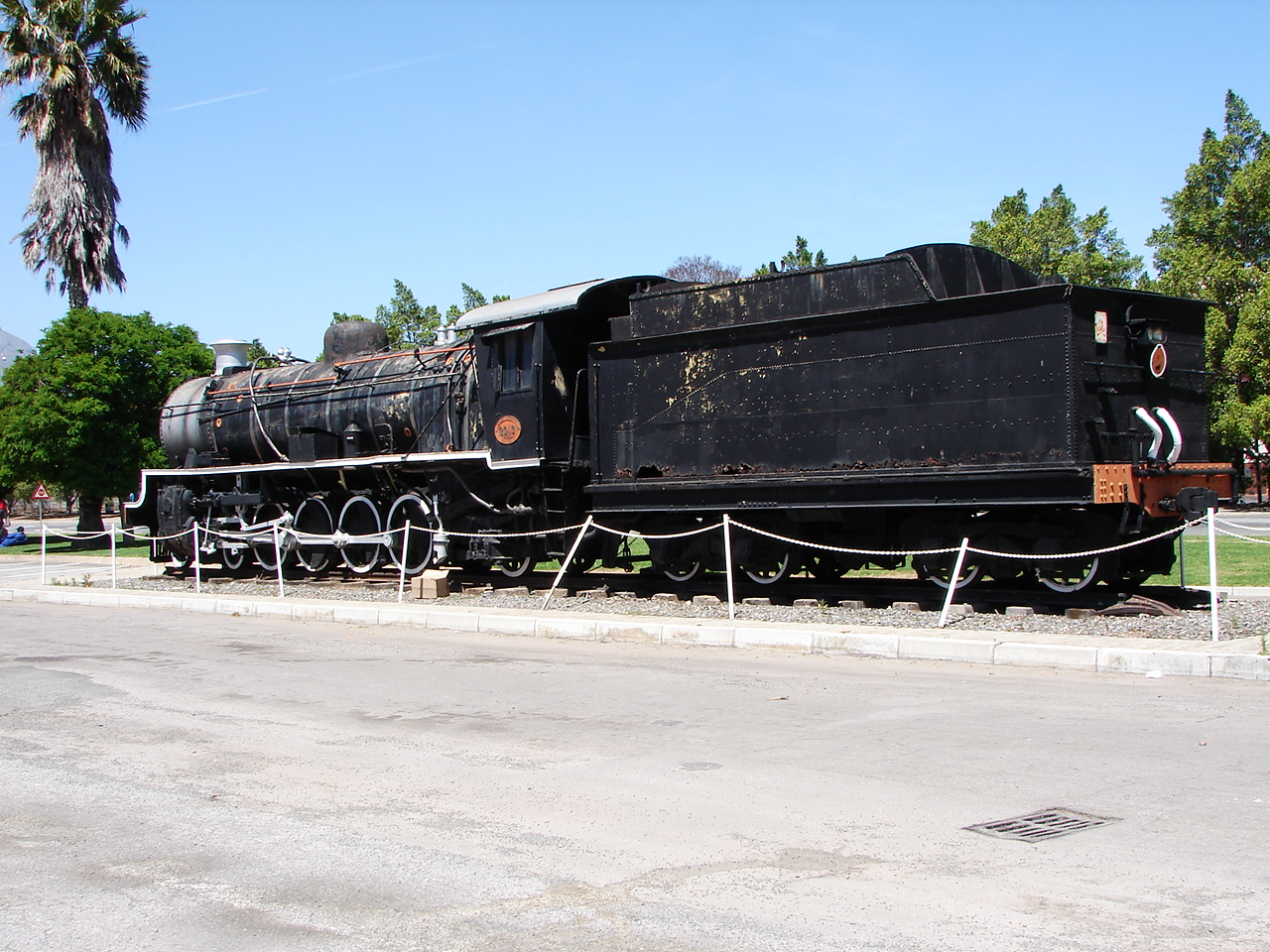
Modified Type LP on Class 14CRB no. 2010, 2009
