= South African Class MJ1 2-6-6-0 =

1918 articulated steam locomotive

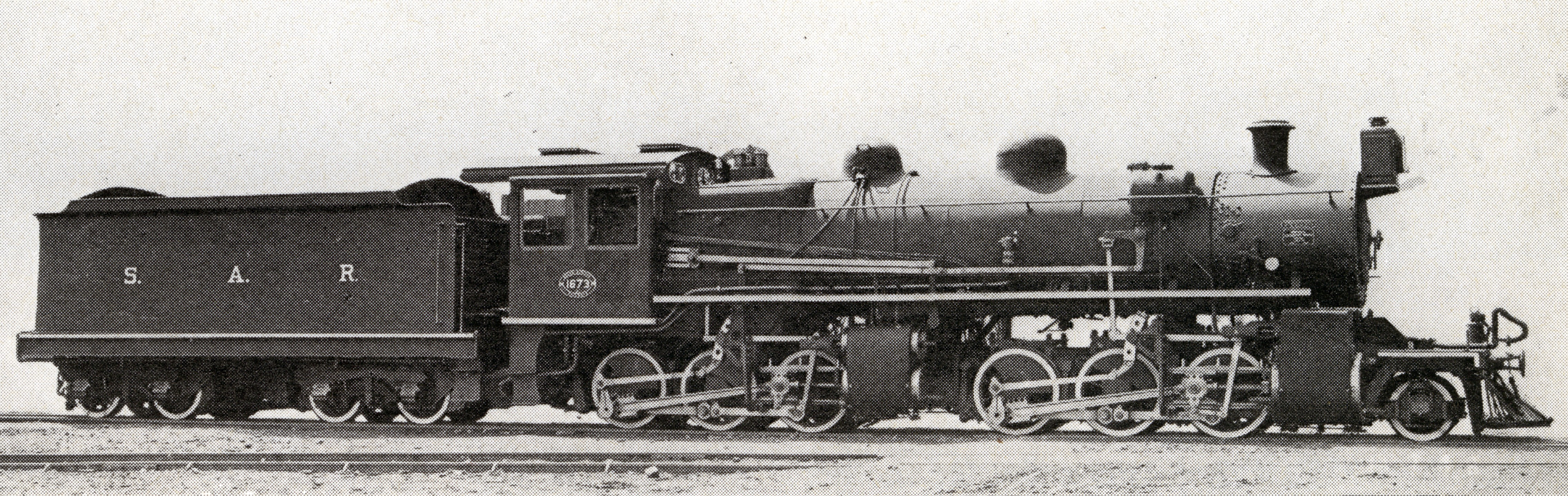
- SAR Class MJ1 no. 1673, c. 1920
Type and origin
- ♠ Locomotive as built – ♥ Reboilered locomotive
- Power type: Steam
- Designer: Montreal Locomotive Works
- Builder: Montreal Locomotive Works
- Serial number: 58427-58434
- Model: SAR Class MJ1
- Build date: 1918
- Total produced: 8
Specifications
- Configuration
  - Whyte: 2-6-6-0 (Denver)
  - UIC: (1'C)Chv4
- Driver: 3rd & 6th coupled axles
- Gauge: 3 ft 6 in (1,067 mm) Cape gauge
- Leading dia.: 28 1/2 in (724 mm)
- Coupled dia.: 42 1/2 in (1,080 mm) as built 42 3/4 in (1,086 mm) retyred
- Tender wheels: 34 in (864 mm)
- Wheelbase: 60 ft 8 1/4 in (18,498 mm)
  - Engine: 32 ft 8 in (9,957 mm)
  - Coupled: 8 ft 4 in (2,540 mm) per unit
  - Tender: 17 ft 11 in (5,461 mm)
  - Tender bogie: 4 ft 7 in (1,397 mm)
- Length
  - Over couplers: 68 ft 7 1/8 in (20,907 mm)
- Height: ♠♥ 12 ft 6 1/8 in (3,813 mm)
- Frame type: Bar
- Axle load: ♠ 14 LT 2 cwt (14,330 kg)
  - Leading: ♠ 7 LT 10 cwt (7,620 kg)
  - 1st coupled: ♠ 13 LT 13 cwt (13,870 kg)
  - 2nd coupled: ♠ 13 LT 15 cwt (13,970 kg)
  - 3rd coupled: ♠ 14 LT 2 cwt (14,330 kg)
  - 4th coupled: ♠ 12 LT 11 cwt (12,750 kg)
  - 5th coupled: ♠ 13 LT 12 cwt (13,820 kg)
  - 6th coupled: ♠ 13 LT 7 cwt (13,560 kg)
  - Tender axle: 12 LT 14 cwt 2 qtr (12,930 kg) av.
- Adhesive weight: ♠ 81 LT (82,300 kg)
- Loco weight: ♠ 88 LT 10 cwt (89,920 kg)
- Tender weight: 50 LT 18 cwt (51,720 kg)
- Total weight: ♠ 139 LT 8 cwt (141,600 kg)
- Tender type: LP (2-axle bogies)
- Fuel type: Coal
- Fuel capacity: 10 LT (10.2 t)
- Water cap.: 4,250 imp gal (19,300 L)
- Firebox
  - Type: Belpaire
  - Grate area: ♠♥ 40 sq ft (3.7 m^{2})
- Boiler
  - Pitch: ♠♥ 7 ft 9 1/8 in (2,365 mm)
  - Diameter: ♠ 5 ft 2 3/4 in (1,594 mm) ♥ 5 ft 1 1/2 in (1,562 mm)
  - Tube plates: ♠ 17 ft 3/8 in (5,191 mm) ♥ 17 ft 1/4 in (5,188 mm)
  - Small tubes: ♠ 146: 2 in (51 mm) ♥ 151: 2 in (51 mm)
  - Large tubes: ♠ 22: 5 3/8 in (137 mm) ♥ 18: 5 1/2 in (140 mm)
- Boiler pressure: ♠♥ 200 psi (1,379 kPa)
- Safety valve: Ramsbottom
- Heating surface
  - Firebox: ♠ 136 sq ft (12.6 m^{2}) ♥ 133 sq ft (12.4 m^{2})
  - Tubes: ♠ 1,906 sq ft (177.1 m^{2}) ♥ 1,780 sq ft (165 m^{2})
  - Total surface: ♠ 2,042 sq ft (189.7 m^{2}) ♥ 1,913 sq ft (177.7 m^{2})
- Superheater
  - Type: ♠♥ Schmidt
  - Heating area: ♠ 413 sq ft (38.4 m^{2}) ♥ 350 sq ft (33 m^{2})
- Cylinders: Four
- High-pressure cylinder: 16 1/2 in (419 mm) bore 24 in (610 mm) stroke
- Low-pressure cylinder: 26 in (660 mm) bore 24 in (610 mm) stroke
- Valve gear: Walschaerts
- Valve type: Piston
- Couplers: Johnston link-and-pin AAR knuckle (1930s)
Performance figures
- Tractive effort: ♠ 38,170 lbf (169.8 kN) @ 50% ♥ 37,950 lbf (168.8 kN) @ 50%
Career
- Operators: South African Railways
- Class: Class MJ1
- Number in class: 8
- Numbers: 1666–1673
- Delivered: 1918
- First run: 1918
- Withdrawn: c. 1960

The South African Railways Class MJ1 2-6-6-0 of 1918 was a class of articulated steam locomotives.

In 1918, the South African Railways placed eight Class MJ1 Mallet articulated compound steam locomotives with a 2-6-6-0 wheel arrangement in branch line service.

== Manufacturer ==
Because of the difficulties experienced by the usual British and German suppliers to build new locomotives during the First World War, orders for the Class MJ1 2-6-6-0 Mallet articulated compound steam locomotive were placed with Montreal Locomotive Works (MLW) in Canada. The locomotive was designed by MLW, based on the specifications for the Class MJ Mallet which had been designed by D.A. Hendrie, the Chief Mechanical Engineer (CME) of the South African Railways (SAR) from 1910 to 1922. Eight of these branch line locomotives were built and delivered by MLW in November 1918, numbered in the range from 1666 to 1673.

== Characteristics ==
The locomotives were superheated, had Walschaerts valve gear and, like the Class MJ Mallets, had Belpaire fireboxes, but slightly larger boilers. When compared to the Class MJ, a distinguishing feature of the Class MJ1 was the sandbox which was mounted on top of the boiler to the rear of the steam dome in North American style. In general appearance, they bore a family resemblance to the Class 14C and Class 15B 4-8-2 locomotives which were also built by MLW in 1918.

During 1922, the coupled wheels were retyred and their diameter was increased from 42 1/2 inches (1,080 millimetres) to 42 3/4 inches (1,086 millimetres).

== Reboilering ==
During 1939, while W.A.J. Day was the CME of the SAR, the Classes MJ and MJ1 were modified slightly to be reboilered with the same standard boiler.

== Service ==
The Class MJ1 was the last Mallet locomotive class to be placed in service by the SAR. All the Railway's subsequent new articulated locomotives were to be Garratts, Modified Fairlies and Union Garratts.

The Class MJ1 was also intended for branch line working and joined the Class MJ Mallets in service in the Eastern Cape. All eight were still in service by March 1948, but they were all withdrawn from service by 1960.

== Illustration ==
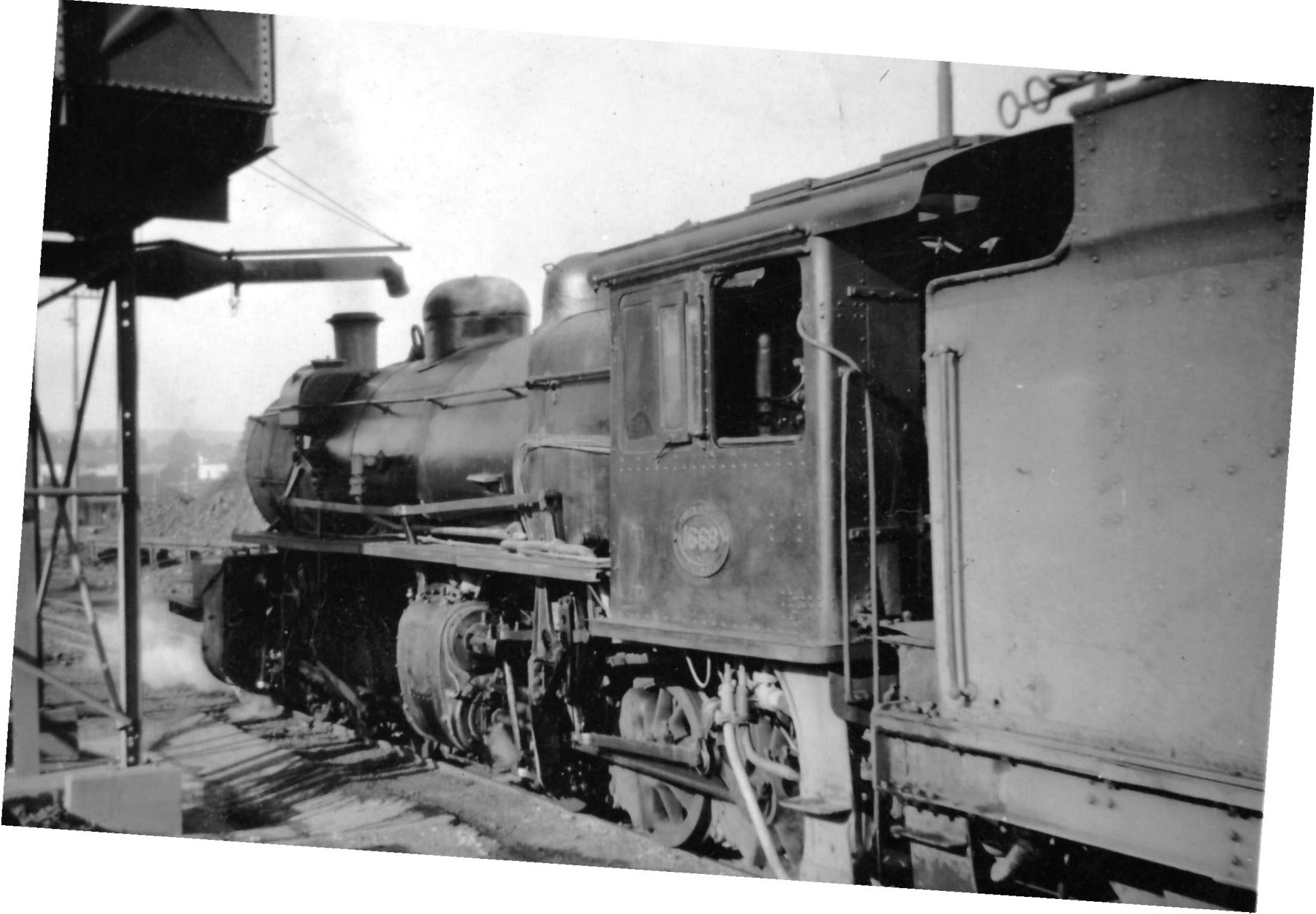
No. 1668 at Butterworth, Eastern Cape, c. 1950
