= South African Class 14C 4-8-2, 1st batch =

1918 design of steam locomotive

South African Class 14C, 14CB, 14CR & 14CRB 4-8-2, 1st batch
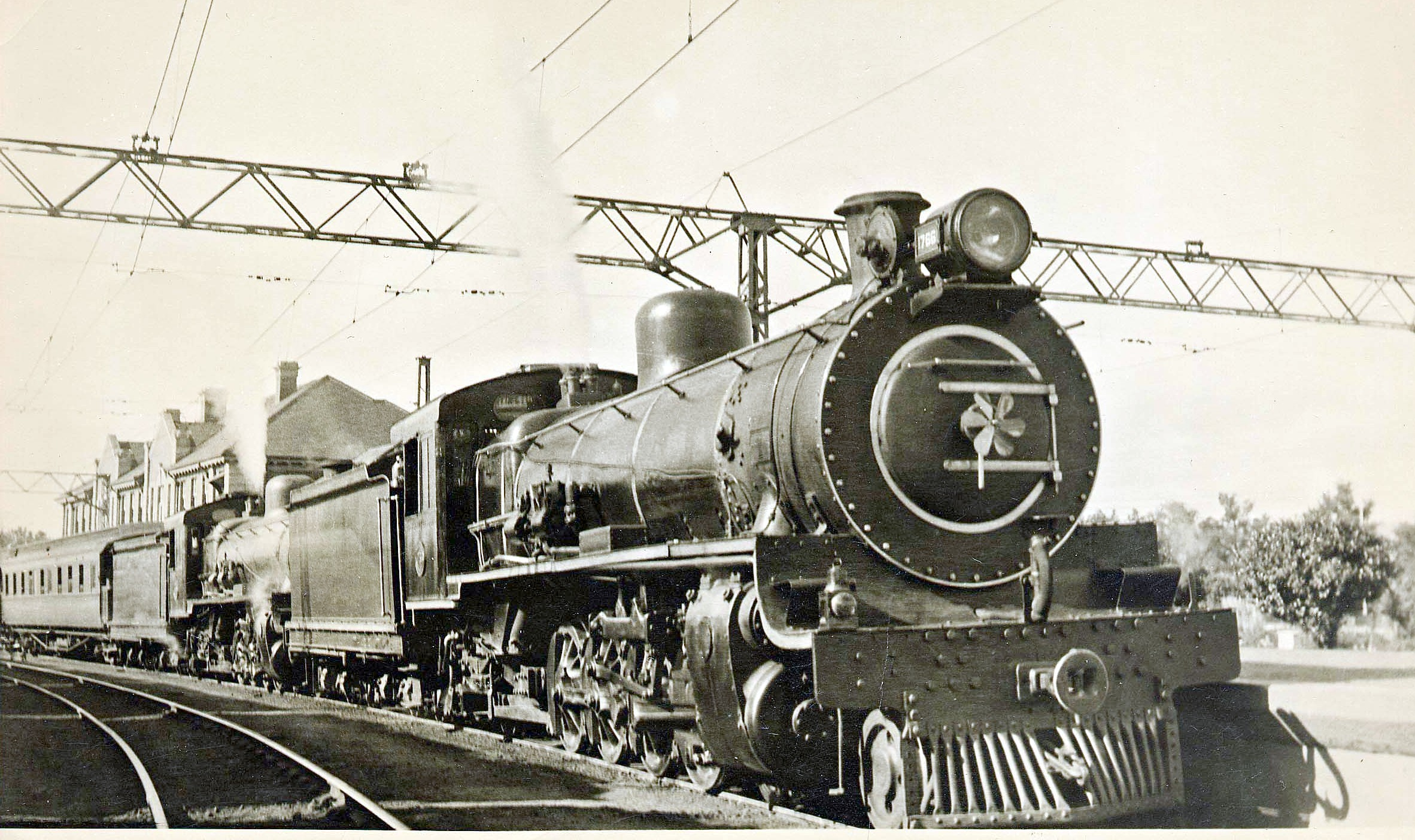
- No. 1766, as built with a Belpaire firebox, c. 1930
Type and origin
- ♠ Class 14C, standard, as built with a Belpaire firebox ♥ Class 14CB, rebalanced for branchline working ♣ Class 14CR, standard, Watson Standard boiler ♦ Class 14CRB, branchline, Watson Standard boiler ʘ 22 in (559 mm) bore - ʘ 21 3/4 in (552 mm) bore
- Power type: Steam
- Designer: Montreal Locomotive Works
- Builder: Montreal Locomotive Works
- Serial number: 58637-58656
- Model: Class 14C
- Build date: 1918-1919
- Total produced: 20
Specifications
- Configuration
  - Whyte: 4-8-2 (Mountain)
  - UIC: 2'D1'h2
- Driver: 2nd coupled axle
- Gauge: 3 ft 6 in (1,067 mm) Cape gauge
- Leading dia.: 28 1/2 in (724 mm)
- Coupled dia.: 48 in (1,219 mm)
- Trailing dia.: 33 in (838 mm)
- Tender wheels: 34 in (864 mm)
- Wheelbase: 59 ft 1/4 in (17,990 mm)
  - Engine: 30 ft 8 in (9,347 mm)
  - Leading: 6 ft 2 in (1,880 mm)
  - Coupled: 12 ft 9 in (3,886 mm)
  - Tender: 17 ft 11 in (5,461 mm)
  - Tender bogie: 4 ft 7 in (1,397 mm)
- Length
  - Over couplers: 66 ft 10 1/8 in (20,374 mm)
- Height: ♠♥ 12 ft 9 3/8 in (3,896 mm) ♣♦ 13 ft 3/4 in (3,981 mm)
- Frame type: Bar
- Axle load: ♠ 15 LT 16 cwt (16,050 kg) ♥ 14 LT 16 cwt (15,040 kg) ♣ 16 LT 15 cwt (17,020 kg) ♦ 14 LT 17 cwt (15,090 kg)
  - Leading: ♠ 14 LT 8 cwt (14,630 kg) ♥ 14 LT 6 cwt (14,530 kg) ♣ 16 LT 2 cwt (16,360 kg) ♦ 14 LT 8 cwt (14,630 kg)
  - 1st coupled: ♠ 15 LT 10 cwt (15,750 kg) ♥ 14 LT 16 cwt (15,040 kg) ♣ 16 LT 8 cwt (16,660 kg) ♦ 14 LT 17 cwt (15,090 kg)
  - 2nd coupled: ♠ 14 LT 19 cwt (15,190 kg) ♥ 14 LT 14 cwt (14,940 kg) ♣ 15 LT 15 cwt (16,000 kg) ♦ 14 LT 14 cwt (14,940 kg)
  - 3rd coupled: ♠ 15 LT 12 cwt (15,850 kg) ♥ 14 LT 14 cwt (14,940 kg) ♣ 16 LT 10 cwt (16,760 kg) ♦ 14 LT 15 cwt (14,990 kg)
  - 4th coupled: ♠ 15 LT 16 cwt (16,050 kg) ♥ 14 LT 16 cwt (15,040 kg) ♣ 16 LT 15 cwt (17,020 kg) ♦ 14 LT 17 cwt (15,090 kg)
  - Trailing: ♠ 8 LT 12 cwt (8,738 kg) ♥ 10 LT 1 cwt (10,210 kg) ♣ 9 LT 1 cwt (9,195 kg) ♦ 10 LT 1 cwt (10,210 kg)
  - Tender axle: 12 LT 14 cwt 2 qtr (12,930 kg) av.
- Adhesive weight: ♠ 61 LT 17 cwt (62,840 kg) ♥ 59 LT (59,950 kg) ♣ 65 LT 8 cwt (66,450 kg) ♦ 59 LT 3 cwt (60,100 kg)
- Loco weight: ♠ 84 LT 17 cwt (86,210 kg) ♥ 83 LT 7 cwt (84,690 kg) ♣ 90 LT 11 cwt (92,000 kg) ♦ 83 LT 12 cwt (84,940 kg)
- Tender weight: 50 LT 18 cwt (51,720 kg)
- Total weight: ♠ 135 LT 15 cwt (137,900 kg) ♥ 134 LT 5 cwt (136,400 kg) ♣ 141 LT 9 cwt (143,700 kg) ♦ 134 LT 10 cwt (136,700 kg)
- Tender type: LP (2-axle bogies)
- Fuel type: Coal
- Fuel capacity: 10 LT (10.2 t)
- Water cap.: 4,250 imp gal (19,300 L)
- Firebox
  - Type: ♠♥ Belpaire ♣♦ Round-top
  - Grate area: ♠♥♣♦ 37 sq ft (3.437 m^{2})
- Boiler
  - Model: ♣♦ Watson Standard no. 2
  - Pitch: ♠♥ 7 ft 7 in (2,311 mm) ♣♦ 8 ft 1 1/2 in (2,476 mm)
  - Diameter: ♠♥♣♦ 5 ft 7 1/2 in (1,714 mm)
  - Tube plates: ♠♥ 19 ft 3/8 in (5,801 mm) ♣♦ 19 ft 4 in (5,893 mm) steel ♣♦ 19 ft 3 5/8 in (5,883 mm) copper
  - Small tubes: ♠♥ 139: 2 1/4 in (57 mm) ♣♦ 87: 2 1/2 in (64 mm)
  - Large tubes: ♠♥ 24: 5 1/2 in (140 mm) ♣♦ 30: 5 1/2 in (140 mm)
- Boiler pressure: ♠♣ʘ 190 psi (1,310 kPa) ♠♣ʘ 195 psi (1,344 kPa) ♥♦ʘ 180 psi (1,241 kPa) ♦ʘ 183 psi (1,262 kPa)
- Safety valve: ♠♥ Ramsbottom ♣♦ Pop
- Heating surface
  - Firebox: ♠♥ 138 sq ft (12.8 m^{2}) ♣♦ 142 sq ft (13.2 m^{2})
  - Tubes: ♠♥ 2,212 sq ft (205.5 m^{2}) ♣♦ 1,933 sq ft (179.6 m^{2})
  - Total surface: ♠♥ 2,350 sq ft (218 m^{2}) ♣♦ 2,075 sq ft (192.8 m^{2})
- Superheater
  - Heating area: ♠♥ 526 sq ft (48.9 m^{2}) ♣♦ 492 sq ft (45.7 m^{2})
- Cylinders: Two
- Cylinder size: ♠♥♣♦ 22 in (559 mm) bore ♠♣♦ 21 3/4 in (552 mm) bore ♠♥♣♦ 26 in (660 mm) stroke
- Valve gear: Walschaerts
- Valve type: Piston
- Couplers: Johnston link-and-pin AAR knuckle (1930s)
Performance figures
- Tractive effort: ♠♣ʘ 37,360 lbf (166.2 kN) @ 75% ♠♣ʘ 37,480 lbf (166.7 kN) @ 75% ♥ʘ 35,400 lbf (157 kN) @ 75% ♦ʘ 35,980 lbf (160.0 kN) @ 75% ♦ʘ 35,170 lbf (156.4 kN) @ 75%
Career
- Operators: South African Railways
- Class: Class 14C, 14CB, 14CR, 14CRB
- Number in class: 20
- Numbers: 1761-1780
- Delivered: 1918-1919
- First run: 1918
- Withdrawn: 1980s
- The leading coupled axle had flangeless wheels

The South African Railways Class 14C 4-8-2 of 1918 was a steam locomotive.

In 1918 and 1919, the South African Railways placed the first batch of twenty Class 14C steam locomotives with a 4-8-2 Mountain type wheel arrangement in service. Three more batches were acquired between 1919 and 1922, each with a different maximum axle loading, to bring the total in the class to 73. Through reboilerings, rebalancings and cylinder bushings during its service life, this single class eventually ended up as six distinct locomotive classes with two boiler types and a multitude of axle load and boiler pressure configurations.

== Manufacturer ==
As a result of wartime disruption in Europe and Britain, the fourth version of the Class 14 locomotive was ordered from the Montreal Locomotive Works (MLW) in Canada in 1918. It was designated Class 14C and the first batch of twenty was delivered in 1918 and early in 1919, numbered in the range from 1761 to 1780.

Until 1922, three more batches of Class 14C would follow from the same manufacturer. All four batches differed in terms of maximum axle loading, adhesive weight and engine weight.

== Characteristics ==
While these locomotives were built to the specifications of D.A. Hendrie, at the time the Chief Mechanical Engineer (CME) of the South African Railways (SAR), they were designed by the Canadian manufacturer and the result was a locomotive with some typical North American characteristics. They had large cabs, bar frames, Walschaerts valve gear, Belpaire fireboxes and were superheated.

A prominent distinction from the earlier Classes 14, 14A and 14B locomotives was their American style high running boards. It had an even better cylinder design than the Class 14, with larger and straighter ports which resulted in a very sharp, free exhaust.

All four batches were delivered with Type LP tenders, with a coal capacity of 10 long tons (10.2 tonnes) and a water capacity of 4,250 imperial gallons (19,300 litres).

== Modifications and reclassifications ==
The Class 14C proved to be good locomotives, even though they initially suffered from some rather bad teething troubles. Once these were rectified, they went on to become fine performers which were associated with hard work all through their service lives.

During 1920, most of the fireboxes on the early orders of the Class 14C were restayed. The reversing gear was of the single cylinder type and tended to creep. Hendrie therefore fitted oil cylinders and installed his Hendrie reversing gear, which was manufactured in the Pretoria workshops during 1922. Modifications were also made to the finger bars and rocking grate cylinders of the firebox and to the sanding gear. Approximately 2 long tons (2.0 tonnes) of lead were run into the smokebox saddle casting to provide additional weight on the leading bogie.

=== Watson Standard boilers ===
During the 1930s, many serving locomotives were reboilered with a standard boiler type designed by A.G. Watson, CME of the SAR at the time, as part of his standardisation policy. Such Watson Standard reboilered locomotives were reclassified by adding an "R" suffix to their classification.

All twenty locomotives were eventually reboilered with Watson Standard no. 2 boilers and reclassified to Class 14CR. Only slight alterations were necessary to the engine frames. In the process, the boiler pitch was raised from 7 feet 7 inches (2,311 millimetres) to 8 feet 1 1/2 inches (2,476 millimetres), which raised the chimney height from 12 feet 9 3/8 inches (3,896 millimetres) to 13 feet 3/4 inch (3,981 millimetres) and exceeded the loading gauge height of 13 feet (3,962 millimetres) above the railhead. The only other engine on which reboilering resulted in the exceeding of the height restriction was the Class 15BR.

The reboilered engines were also equipped with Watson cabs with their distinctive slanted fronts, compared to the conventional vertical fronts of their original cabs. Early conversions were equipped with copper and later conversions with steel fireboxes. Three of them, numbers 1762 to 1764, would not undergo further modifications and would retain the Class 14CR designation.

Their original Belpaire boilers were fitted with Ramsbottom safety valves, while the Watson Standard boiler was fitted with Pop safety valves. An obvious difference between an original and a Watson Standard reboilered locomotive is usually a rectangular regulator cover, just to the rear of the chimney on the reboilered locomotive. In the case of the Class 14C, two even more obvious differences were the Watson cab and the absence of the Belpaire firebox hump between the cab and boiler on the reboilered locomotives.

=== Rebalancing ===
Around 1930, the question of maximum axle loads for locomotives was thoroughly investigated by the Mechanical and Civil Engineering Departments of the SAR. It was found that, among some other locomotives, the Class 14C had a rather severe vertical hammer blow effect on the track when running at speed due to an undue proportion of the reciprocating parts being balanced. Modifications were accordingly made to the Class 14C to allow some of them to run on 60 pounds per yard (30 kilograms per metre) track.

The locomotives had weights attached between the frames to increase adhesion. Over time, most of the Class 14C family of locomotives were "rebalanced" by having these weights increased or reduced to redistribute, increase or reduce the axle loading and adhesive weight by altering the loads on the individual coupled wheels, leading bogies and trailing pony trucks. Coupled wheel axle loading adjustment was achieved by attaching steel boxes, filled with an appropriate amount of lead, over each axle between the frames. Their boiler pressure setting was reduced from 190 to 180 pounds per square inch (1,310 to 1,241 kilopascals).

The lighter version of the rebalanced locomotives was reclassified to Class 14CB, with the "B" indicating branch line service. Those which had also been reboilered with Watson Standard no. 2 boilers were reclassified to Class 14CRB.

=== Cylinder bushing ===
Several of the locomotives had their cylinders bushed to reduce the bore from the as-built 22 to 21 3/4 inches (559 to 552 millimetres). At the same time the boiler pressure setting of the Classes 14C and 14CR locomotives was adjusted upwards from 190 to 195 pounds per square inch (1,310 to 1,344 kilopascals) to keep their tractive effort more or less unaffected by the reduction in piston diameter. The boiler pressure setting of the branchline Classes 14CB and 14CRB was adjusted upwards from 180 to 183 pounds per square inch (1,241 to 1,262 kilopascals).

== Service ==
=== South African Railways ===
The Class 14C was placed in service on the Cape Eastern system, working the Umtata branch into Transkei and on the mainline to Cookhouse. Some went to the Cape Western system, where they banked up the Hex River Pass from De Doorns and later worked with Class 19C locomotives across Sir Lowry's Pass to Caledon and Bredasdorp in the Overberg. A few were also used on the Cape Midland system, in Natal and the Eastern Transvaal.

In their later years, many of these locomotives remained on the Cape Western system, most being shedded at Paardeneiland in Cape Town and at Beaufort West, and one at De Aar, where they were mostly used as shunting engines and on short local pick-ups. A large number were also used on the Cape Eastern system, shedded at East London and used as shunting engines, on local pick-ups and also in suburban service. A few also served their last years in the Eastern Transvaal, shedded at Pietersburg and Witbank.

=== Other operators ===
Between 1918 and 1921, the Rhodesia Railways (RR) purchased a slightly lighter version of the original Class 14C from MLW. These were designated the RR Class 11. A further batch was built in 1948 and designated RR Class 11A. Some of the RR Class 11s and all the RR Class 11As were eventually sold to Caminhos de Ferro de Moçambique (CFM) and were utilised on the line between Mozambique and Swaziland (since 2018 renamed to Eswatini).

== Works numbers ==
The table lists their years built, manufacturer's works numbers, engine numbers and eventual classifications.

Class 14C 4-8-2, first batch
Year	Works no.	Engine no.	Class
1918	58637	1761	14CRB
1918	58638	1762	14CR
1918	58639	1763	14CR
1918	58640	1764	14CR
1918	58641	1765	14CRB
1918	58642	1766	14CRB
1918	58643	1767	14CRB
1918	58644	1768	14CRB
1918	58645	1769	14CRB
1918	58646	1770	14CRB
1918	58647	1771	14CRB
1918	58648	1772	14CRB
1918	58649	1773	14CRB
1918	58650	1774	14CRB
1919	58651	1775	14CRB
1919	58652	1776	14CRB
1919	58653	1777	14CRB
1919	58654	1778	14CRB
1919	58655	1779	14CRB
1919	58656	1780	14CRB

== Preservation ==
Number	Works nmr	THF / Private	Leaselend / Owner	Current Location	Outside South Africa	?
1771		Private		Krugersdorp Locomotive Depot		
1778		Private		Queenstown Locomotive Depot		
2010		Private	Municipality	Ashton (Main Street)		

== Illustration ==
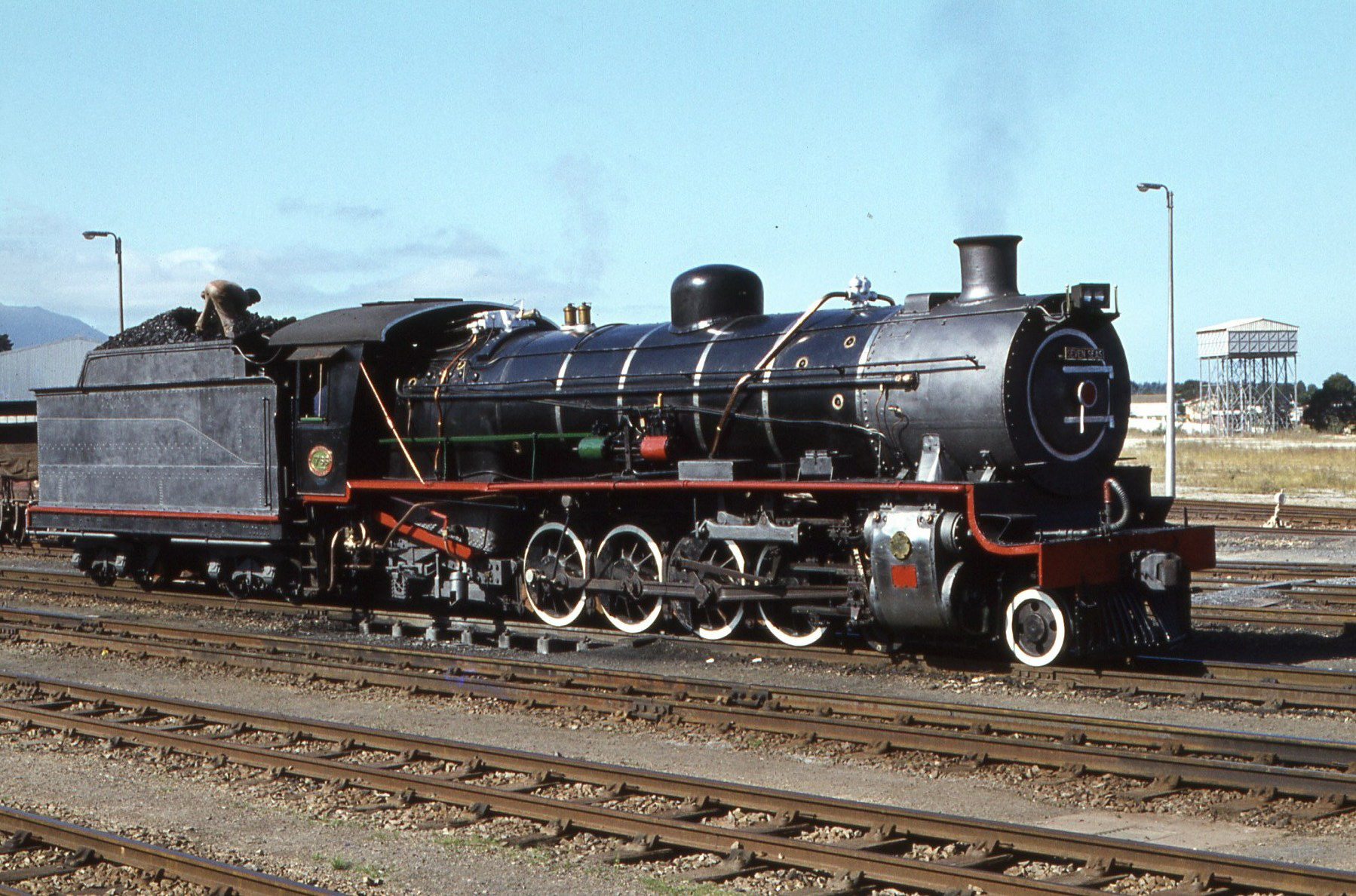
Class 14CRB no. 1766 at George, 18 April 1979

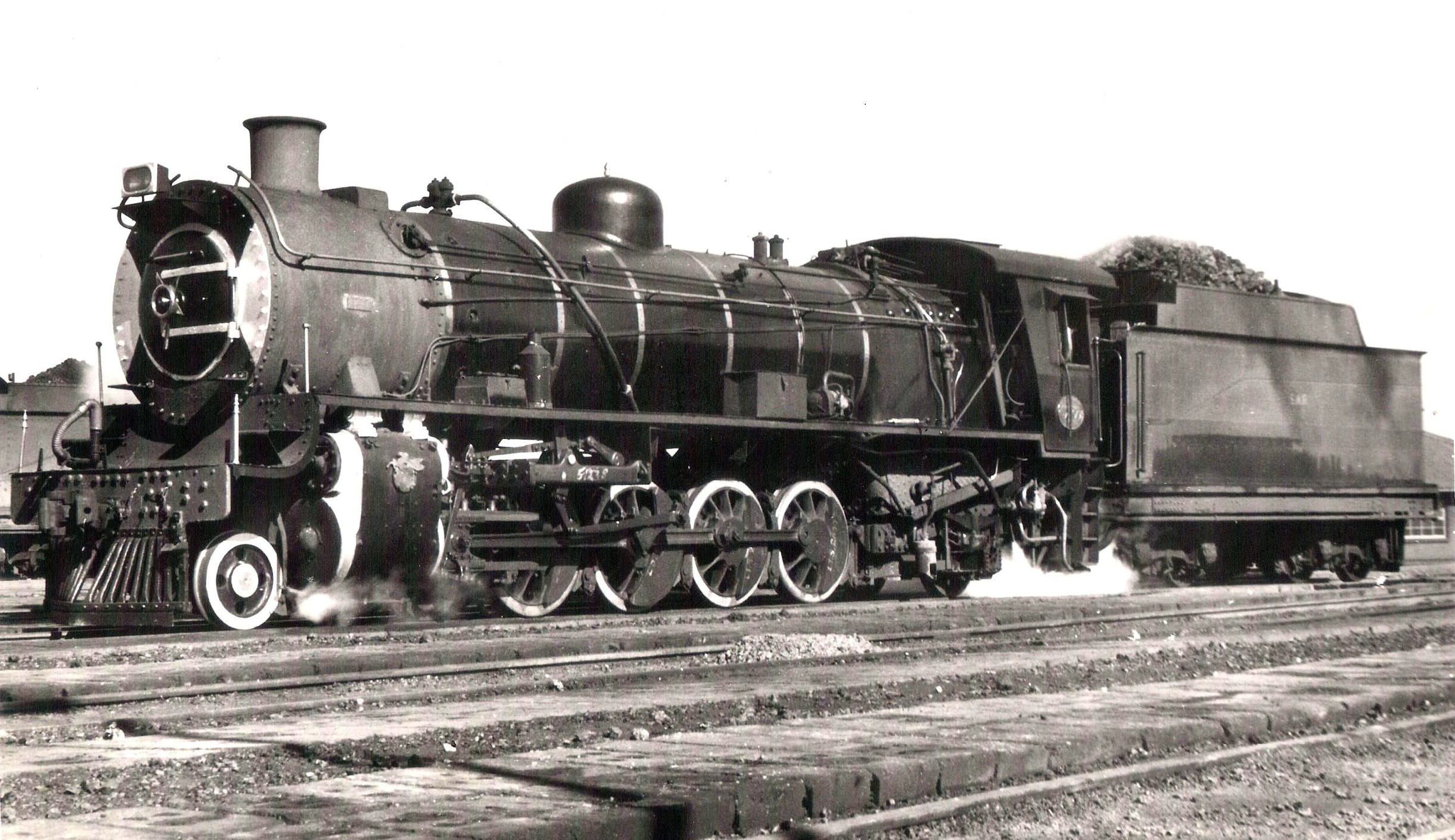
Class 14CRB no. 1777 at East London, c. 1970
