= South African Class 14C 4-8-2, 3rd batch =

1919 design of steam locomotive

South African Class 14C, 14CB, 14CR & 14CRB 4-8-2, 3rd batch
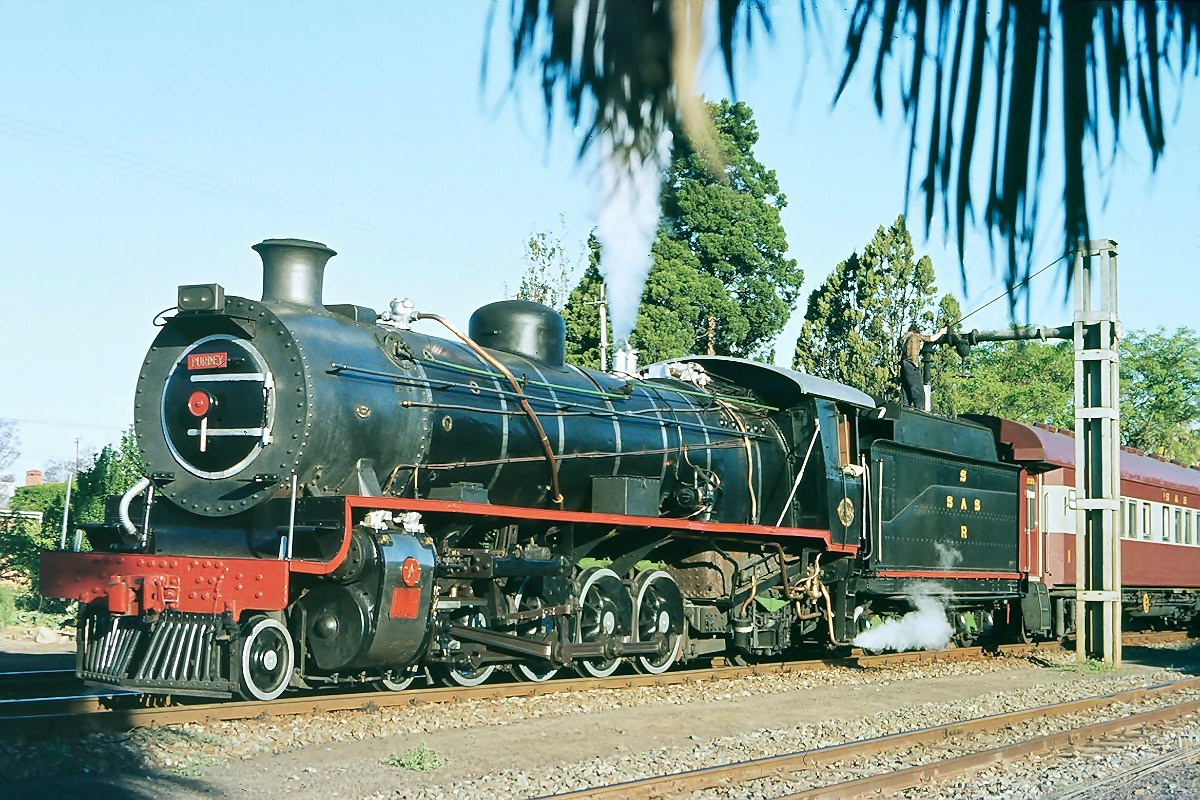
- Class 14CRB no. 2004, Robertson, 1979
Type and origin
- ♠ Class 14C, standard, as built with a Belpaire firebox ♥ Class 14CB, rebalanced for branchline working ♣ Class 14CR, standard, Watson Standard boiler ♦ Class 14CRB, branchline, Watson Standard boiler ʘ 22 in (559 mm) bore - ʘ 21 3/4 in (552 mm) bore
- Power type: Steam
- Designer: Montreal Locomotive Works
- Builder: Montreal Locomotive Works
- Serial number: 60546-60565
- Model: Class 14C
- Build date: 1919
- Total produced: 20
Specifications
- Configuration
  - Whyte: 4-8-2 (Mountain)
  - UIC: 2'D1'h2
- Driver: 2nd coupled axle
- Gauge: 3 ft 6 in (1,067 mm) Cape gauge
- Leading dia.: 28 1/2 in (724 mm)
- Coupled dia.: 48 in (1,219 mm)
- Trailing dia.: 33 in (838 mm)
- Tender wheels: 34 in (864 mm)
- Wheelbase: 59 ft 1/4 in (17,990 mm)
  - Engine: 30 ft 8 in (9,347 mm)
  - Leading: 6 ft 2 in (1,880 mm)
  - Coupled: 12 ft 9 in (3,886 mm)
  - Tender: 17 ft 11 in (5,461 mm)
  - Tender bogie: 4 ft 7 in (1,397 mm)
- Length
  - Over couplers: 66 ft 10 1/8 in (20,374 mm)
- Height: ♠♥ 12 ft 9 3/8 in (3,896 mm) ♣♦ 13 ft 3/4 in (3,981 mm)
- Frame type: Bar
- Axle load: ♠ 15 LT 19 cwt (16,210 kg) ♥ 14 LT 18 cwt (15,140 kg) ♣ 16 LT 15 cwt (17,020 kg) ♦ 14 LT 19 cwt (15,190 kg)
  - Leading: ♠ 14 LT 8 cwt (14,630 kg) ♥ 14 LT 6 cwt (14,530 kg) ♣ 16 LT 2 cwt (16,360 kg) ♦ 14 LT 8 cwt (14,630 kg)
  - 1st coupled: ♠ 15 LT 12 cwt (15,850 kg) ♥ 14 LT 18 cwt (15,140 kg) ♣ 16 LT 8 cwt (16,660 kg) ♦ 14 LT 19 cwt (15,190 kg)
  - 2nd coupled: ♠ 15 LT 1 cwt (15,290 kg) ♥ 14 LT 6 cwt (14,530 kg) ♣ 15 LT 15 cwt (16,000 kg) ♦ 14 LT 16 cwt (15,040 kg)
  - 3rd coupled: ♠ 15 LT 14 cwt (15,950 kg) ♥ 14 LT 17 cwt (15,090 kg) ♣ 16 LT 10 cwt (16,760 kg) ♦ 14 LT 17 cwt (15,090 kg)
  - 4th coupled: ♠ 15 LT 19 cwt (16,210 kg) ♥ 14 LT 18 cwt (15,140 kg) ♣ 16 LT 15 cwt (17,020 kg) ♦ 14 LT 19 cwt (15,190 kg)
  - Trailing: ♠ 8 LT 13 cwt (8,789 kg) ♥ 10 LT 2 cwt (10,260 kg) ♣ 9 LT 1 cwt (9,195 kg) ♦ 10 LT 3 cwt (10,310 kg)
  - Tender axle: 12 LT 14 cwt 2 qtr (12,930 kg) av.
- Adhesive weight: ♠ 62 LT 6 cwt (63,300 kg) ♥ 58 LT 19 cwt (59,900 kg) ♣ 65 LT 8 cwt (66,450 kg) ♦ 59 LT 11 cwt (60,510 kg)
- Loco weight: ♠ 85 LT 7 cwt (86,720 kg) ♥ 83 LT 7 cwt (84,690 kg) ♣ 90 LT 11 cwt (92,000 kg) ♦ 84 LT 2 cwt (85,450 kg)
- Tender weight: 50 LT 18 cwt (51,720 kg)
- Total weight: ♠ 136 LT 5 cwt (138,400 kg) ♥ 134 LT 5 cwt (136,400 kg) ♣ 141 LT 9 cwt (143,700 kg) ♦ 135 LT (137,200 kg)
- Tender type: LP (2-axle bogies)
- Fuel type: Coal
- Fuel capacity: 10 LT (10.2 t)
- Water cap.: 4,250 imp gal (19,300 L)
- Firebox
  - Type: ♠♥ Belpaire - ♣♦ Round-top
  - Grate area: ♠♥♣♦ 37 sq ft (3.437 m^{2})
- Boiler
  - Model: ♣♦ Watson Standard no. 2
  - Pitch: ♠♥ 7 ft 7 in (2,311 mm) ♣♦ 8 ft 1 1/2 in (2,476 mm)
  - Diameter: ♠♥♣♦ 5 ft 7 1/2 in (1,714 mm)
  - Tube plates: ♠♥ 19 ft 3/8 in (5,801 mm) ♣♦ 19 ft 4 in (5,893 mm) steel ♣♦ 19 ft 3 5/8 in (5,883 mm) copper
  - Small tubes: ♠♥ 139: 2 1/4 in (57 mm) ♣♦ 87: 2 1/2 in (64 mm)
  - Large tubes: ♠♥ 24: 5 1/2 in (140 mm) ♣♦ 30: 5 1/2 in (140 mm)
- Boiler pressure: ♠♣ʘ 190 psi (1,310 kPa) ♠♣ʘ 195 psi (1,344 kPa) ♥♦ʘ 180 psi (1,241 kPa) ♦ʘ 183 psi (1,262 kPa)
- Safety valve: ♠♥ Ramsbottom - ♣♦ Pop
- Heating surface
  - Firebox: ♠♥ 138 sq ft (12.8 m^{2}) ♣♦ 142 sq ft (13.2 m^{2})
  - Tubes: ♠♥ 2,212 sq ft (205.5 m^{2}) ♣♦ 1,933 sq ft (179.6 m^{2})
  - Total surface: ♠♥ 2,350 sq ft (218 m^{2}) ♣♦ 2,075 sq ft (192.8 m^{2})
- Superheater
  - Heating area: ♠♥ 526 sq ft (48.9 m^{2}) ♣♦ 492 sq ft (45.7 m^{2})
- Cylinders: Two
- Cylinder size: ♠♥♣♦ 22 in (559 mm) bore ♠♣♦ 21 3/4 in (552 mm) bore ♠♥♣♦ 26 in (660 mm) stroke
- Valve gear: Walschaerts
- Valve type: Piston
- Couplers: Johnston link-and-pin AAR knuckle (1930s)
Performance figures
- Tractive effort: ♠♣ʘ 37,360 lbf (166.2 kN) @ 75% ♠♣ʘ 37,480 lbf (166.7 kN) @ 75% ♥ʘ 35,400 lbf (157 kN) @ 75% ♦ʘ 35,980 lbf (160.0 kN) @ 75% ♦ʘ 35,170 lbf (156.4 kN) @ 75%
Career
- Operators: South African Railways
- Class: Class 14C, 14CB, 14CR, 14CRB
- Number in class: 20
- Numbers: 1991-2010
- Delivered: 1919
- First run: 1919
- Withdrawn: 1980s
- The leading coupled axle had flangeless wheels

The South African Railways Class 14C 4-8-2 of 1919 was a steam locomotive.

In late 1919, the South African Railways placed a third batch of twenty Class 14C steam locomotives with a 4-8-2 Mountain type wheel arrangement in service. In addition to the first three batches, one more batch would be acquired in 1922, all four with different maximum axle loadings, to bring the total in the class to 73. Through reboilerings, rebalancings and cylinder bushings during its service life, this single class eventually ended up as six distinct locomotive classes with two boiler types and a multitude of axle loading and boiler pressure configurations.

== Manufacturer ==
In 1919, a third batch of twenty Class 14C locomotives was ordered from the Montreal Locomotive Works (MLW) in Canada. It was delivered late in that same year and numbered in the range from 1991 to 2010. In 1922, one more batch of Class 14C locomotives would follow from the same manufacturer. All four batches differed in terms of maximum axle loading, adhesive weight and engine weight.

== Characteristics ==
As built, the locomotives of the third batch were heavier than both previous batches, 10 long hundredweight (508 kilograms) heavier than the first and 1 long ton 14 hundredweight (1,727 kilograms) heavier than the second. All four batches were delivered with Type LP tenders with a coal capacity of 10 long tons (10.2 tonnes) and a water capacity of 4,250 imperial gallons (19,300 litres).

== Modifications and reclassifications ==
During 1920, it was found necessary to restay most of the fireboxes on the early orders of the Class 14C. Their reversing gear was of the single cylinder type and tended to creep. D.A. Hendrie, at the time the Chief Mechanical Engineer (CME) of the South African Railways (SAR), therefore fitted oil cylinders and installed his Hendrie reversing gear, which was manufactured in the Pretoria workshops during 1922. Modifications were also made to the finger bars and rocking grate cylinders of the firebox and to the sanding gear. Approximately 2 long tons (2.0 tonnes) of lead were run into the smokebox saddle casting to provide additional weight on the leading bogie.

=== Watson Standard boilers ===
During the 1930s, many serving locomotives were reboilered with a standard boiler type designed by A.G. Watson, CME of the SAR at the time, as part of his standardisation policy. Such Watson Standard reboilered locomotives were reclassified by adding an "R" suffix to their classification.

All twenty locomotives were eventually reboilered with Watson Standard no. 2 boilers and reclassified to Class 14CR. Only slight alterations were necessary to the engine frames. In the process, the boiler pitch was raised from 7 feet 7 inches (2,311 millimetres) to 8 feet 1 1/2 inches (2,476 millimetres), which raised the chimney height from 12 feet 9 3/8 inches (3,896 millimetres) to 13 feet 3/4 inch (3,981 millimetres). This exceeded the loading gauge height of 13 feet (3,962 millimetres) above the railhead.

Their original Belpaire boilers were fitted with Ramsbottom safety valves, while the Watson Standard boiler was fitted with Pop safety valves. The reboilered engines were also equipped with Watson cabs with their distinctive slanted fronts, compared to the conventional vertical fronts of their original cabs. Early conversions were equipped with copper and later conversions with steel fireboxes.

=== Rebalancing ===
Around 1930, the question of maximum axle loads for locomotives was thoroughly investigated by the Mechanical and Civil Engineering Departments of the SAR. It was found that, along with some other locomotives, the Class 14C had a rather severe vertical hammer blow effect on the track when running at speed due to an undue proportion of the reciprocating parts being balanced. Modifications were accordingly made to the Class 14C to allow some of them to run on 60 pounds per yard (30 kilograms per metre) track.

The locomotives had weights attached between the frames to increase adhesion. Over time, most of the Class 14C family of locomotives were "rebalanced" by having these weights increased or reduced to redistribute, increase or reduce the axle loading and adhesive weight by altering the loads on the individual coupled wheels, leading bogies and trailing pony trucks. Coupled wheel axle loading adjustment was achieved by attaching steel boxes, filled with an appropriate amount of lead, over each axle between the frames. The boiler pressure setting of rebalanced locomotives was reduced from 190 to 180 pounds per square inch (1,310 to 1,241 kilopascals).

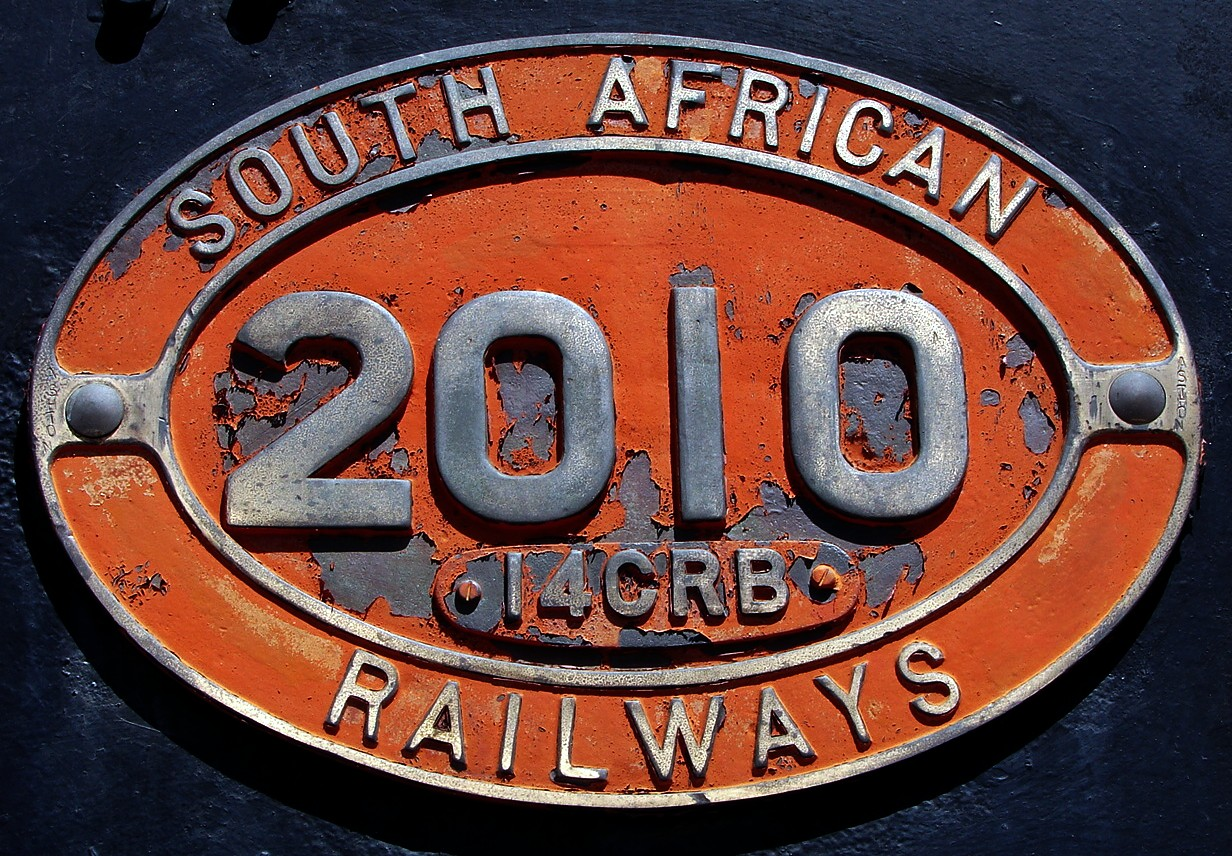

The lighter version of the rebalanced locomotives was reclassified to Class 14CB, with the "B" indicating branchline service. It is not clear which of these reboilering and rebalancing modifications were carried out first, one, the other, either one or together, but in whichever order, all twenty locomotives were eventually also reboilered with Watson Standard no. 2 boilers and reclassified to Class 14CRB. Reclassified Class 14C locomotives often did not receive new number plates. Instead, the previous Class number was milled out and a separate small plate, inscribed with the new Class number and "RB" suffix, was attached to the number plate.

=== Cylinder bushing ===
Several of the locomotives had their cylinders bushed to reduce the bore from the as-built 22 to 21 3/4 inches (559 to 552 millimetres). At the same time, the boiler pressure setting of the Classes 14C and 14CR locomotives was adjusted upwards from 190 to 195 pounds per square inch (1,310 to 1,344 kilopascals) to keep their tractive effort more or less unaffected by the reduction in piston diameter. The boiler pressure setting of the branchline Classes 14CB and 14CRB was adjusted upwards from 180 to 183 pounds per square inch (1,241 to 1,262 kilopascals).

== Service ==
The third batch of the Class 14C was placed in service on the Cape Western system, where they banked up the Hex River railpass from De Doorns and later worked with Class 19C locomotives across Sir Lowry's Pass to Caledon and Bredasdorp in the Overberg. After the New Cape Central Railway was incorporated into the SAR in 1925, they were also employed on that line between Worcester and Mossel Bay.

Some served on the Umtata branch until it was dieselised early in 1973, after which they were also allocated to Cape Town. In their later years, most of these locomotives remained on the Cape Western system, shedded at Paardeneiland in Cape Town and at Beaufort West, and one at De Aar, mostly being used as shunting engines and on short local pick-ups.

== Works numbers ==
The table lists their years built, manufacturer's works numbers, engine numbers and eventual classifications.

Class 14C 4-8-2, third batch
Year	Works no.	Engine no.	Class
1919	60546	1991	14CRB
1919	60547	1992	14CRB
1919	60548	1993	14CRB
1919	60549	1994	14CRB
1919	60550	1995	14CRB
1919	60551	1996	14CRB
1919	60552	1997	14CRB
1919	60553	1998	14CRB
1919	60554	1999	14CRB
1919	60555	2000	14CRB
1919	60556	2001	14CRB
1919	60557	2002	14CRB
1919	60558	2003	14CRB
1919	60559	2004	14CRB
1919	60560	2005	14CRB
1919	60561	2006	14CRB
1919	60562	2007	14CRB
1919	60563	2008	14CRB
1919	60564	2009	14CRB
1919	60565	2010	14CRB

== Illustration ==
The main picture shows Class 14CRB no. 2004 Purdey taking water at Robertson, Western Cape, on 10 November 1979.

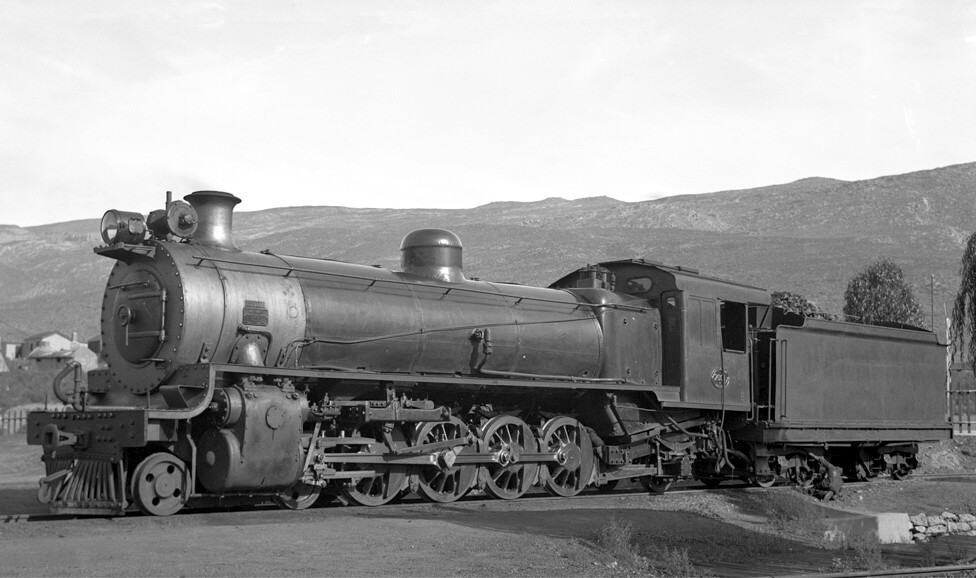
Class 14C no. 2001, as built with a Belpaire firebox, De Doorns, c. 1945

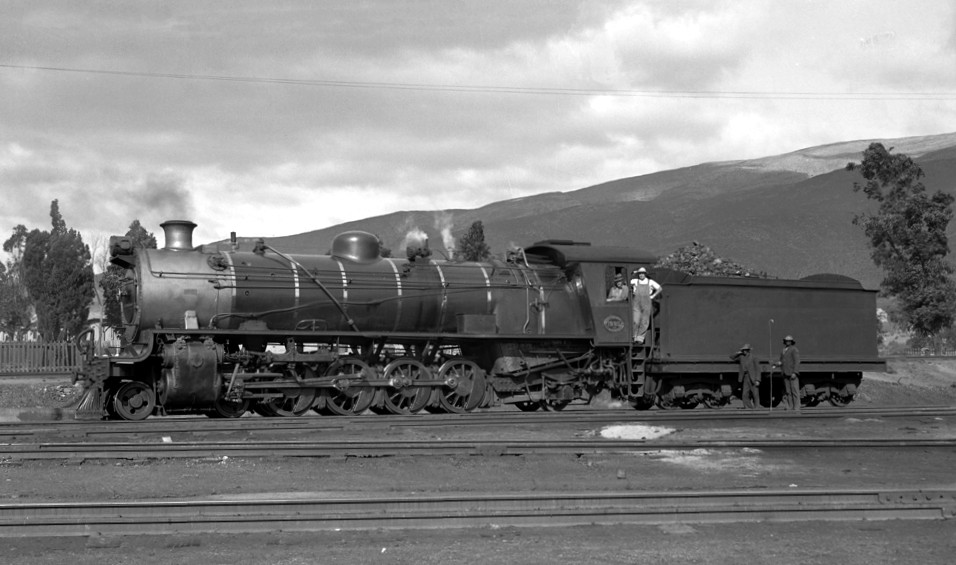
Class 14CR no. 1995, reboilered with a Watson boiler, De Doorns, c. 1945

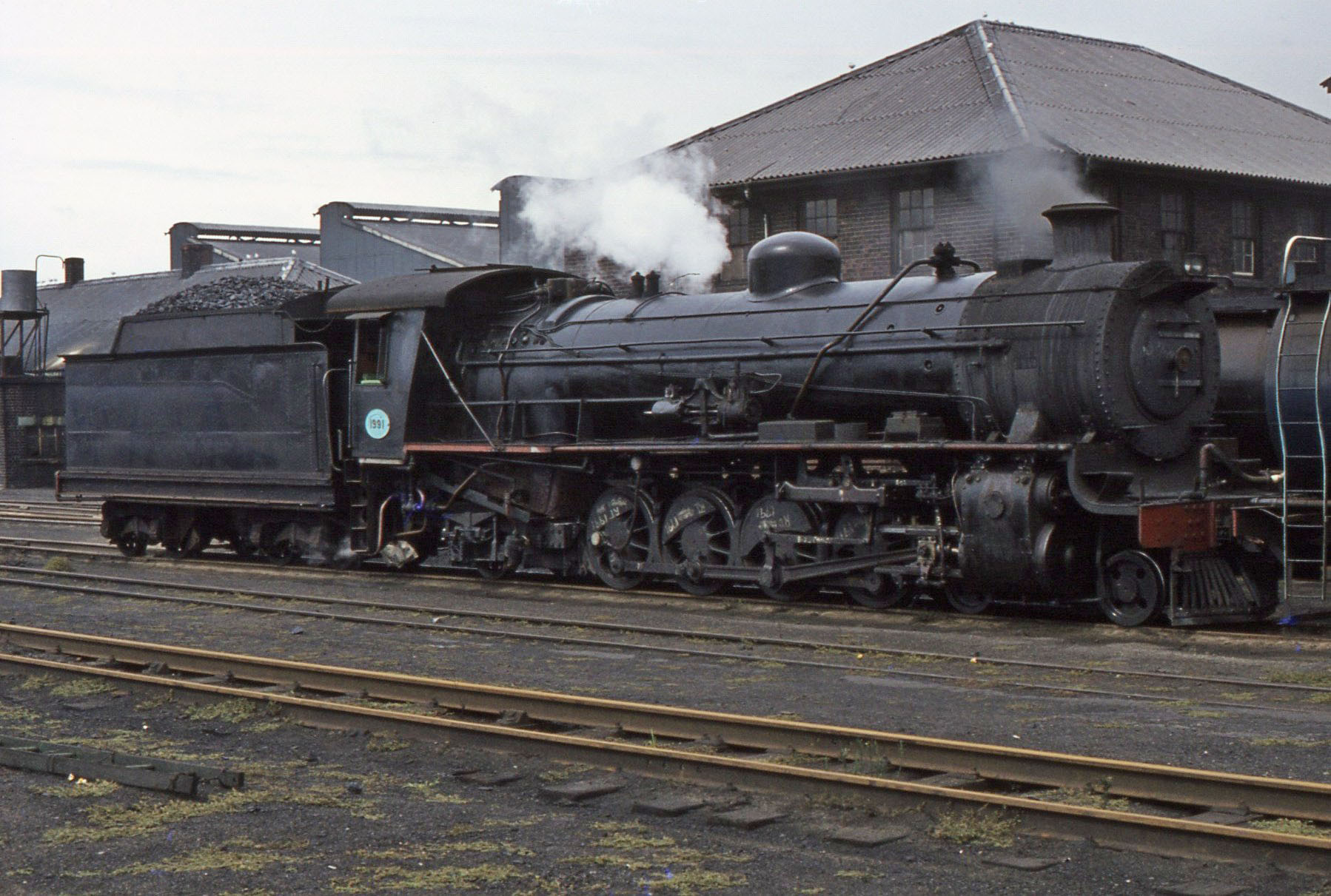
Class 14CRB no. 1991, Paardeneiland, 1 April 1978

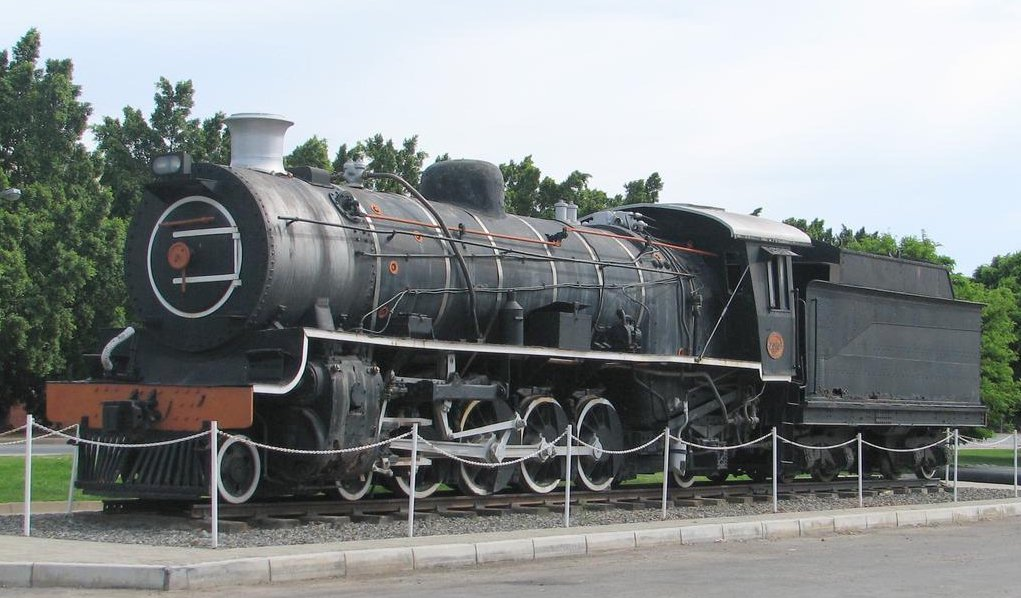
Class 14CRB no. 2010 plinted in Ashton, 22 October 2006
