= South African Class 14C 4-8-2, 4th batch =

1922 design of steam locomotive

South African Class 14C, 14CM, 14CR & 14CRM 4-8-2, 4th batch
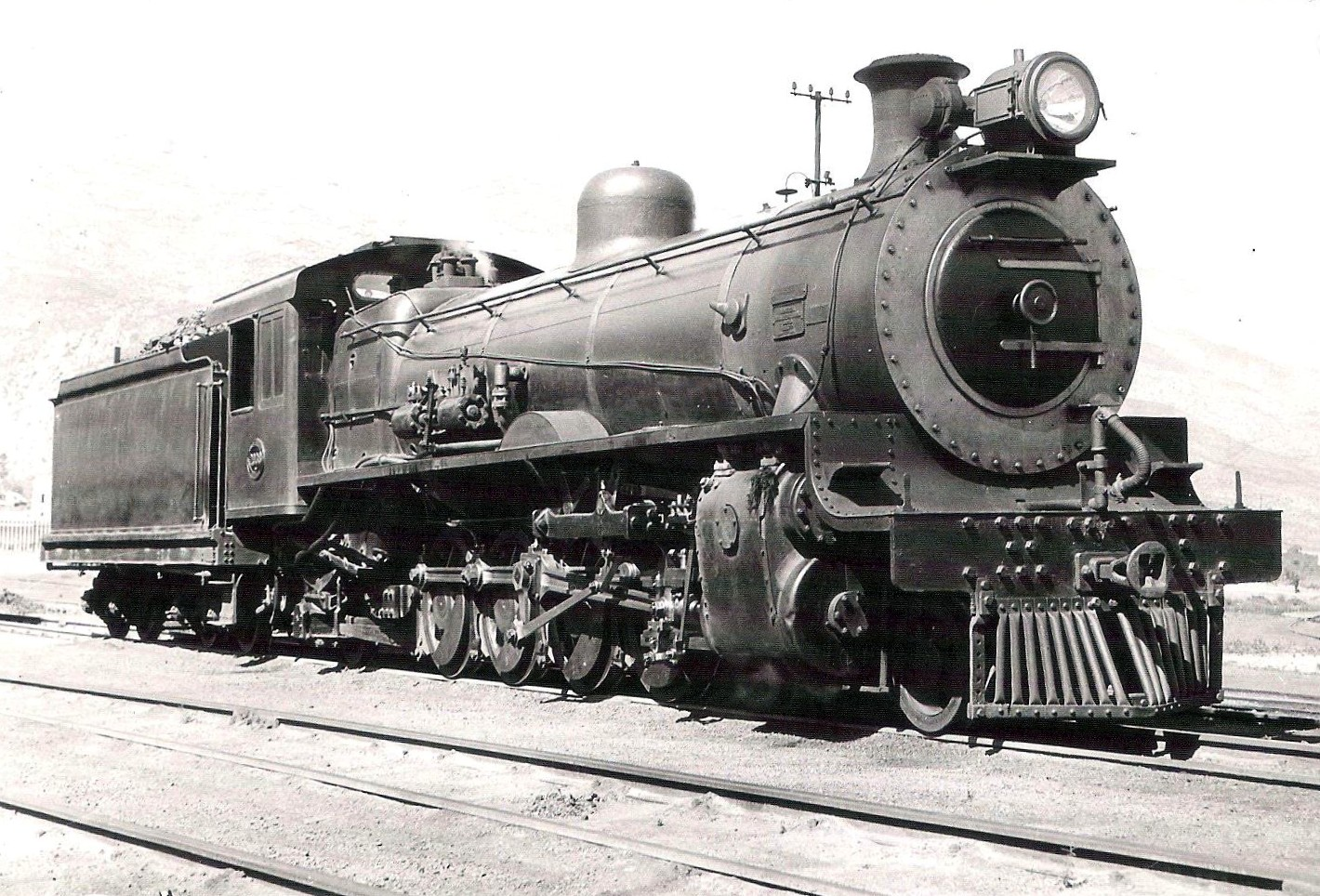
- Class 14CM, fourth batch, possibly no. 2028, c. 1945
Type and origin
- ♠ Class 14C, standard, as built with a Belpaire firebox ♥ Class 14CM, rebalanced for mainline working ♣ Class 14CR, standard, Watson Standard boiler ♦ Class 14CRM, mainline, Watson Standard boiler ʘ 22 in (559 mm) bore - ʘ 21 3/4 in (552 mm) bore
- Power type: Steam
- Designer: Montreal Locomotive Works
- Builder: Montreal Locomotive Works
- Serial number: 63075-63087
- Model: Class 14C
- Build date: 1922
- Total produced: 13
Specifications
- Configuration
  - Whyte: 4-8-2 (Mountain)
  - UIC: 2′D1’h2
- Driver: 2nd coupled axle
- Gauge: 3 ft 6 in (1,067 mm) Cape gauge
- Leading dia.: 28 1/2 in (724 mm)
- Coupled dia.: 48 in (1,219 mm)
- Trailing dia.: 33 in (838 mm)
- Tender wheels: 34 in (864 mm)
- Wheelbase: 59 ft 1/4 in (17,990 mm)
  - Engine: 30 ft 8 in (9,347 mm)
  - Leading: 6 ft 2 in (1,880 mm)
  - Coupled: 12 ft 9 in (3,886 mm)
  - Tender: 17 ft 11 in (5,461 mm)
  - Tender bogie: 4 ft 7 in (1,397 mm)
- Length
  - Over couplers: 66 ft 10 1/8 in (20,374 mm)
- Height: ♠♥ 12 ft 9 3/8 in (3,896 mm) ♣♦ 13 ft 3/4 in (3,981 mm)
- Frame type: Bar
- Axle load: ♠♥ 16 LT 16 cwt (17,070 kg) ♣♦ 16 LT 15 cwt (17,020 kg)
  - Leading: ♠♥ 15 LT 16 cwt (16,050 kg) ♣♦ 16 LT 2 cwt (16,360 kg)
  - 1st coupled: ♠♥ 15 LT 8 cwt (15,650 kg) ♣♦ 16 LT 8 cwt (16,660 kg)
  - 2nd coupled: ♠♥ 16 LT (16,260 kg) ♣♦ 15 LT 15 cwt (16,000 kg)
  - 3rd coupled: ♠♥ 16 LT 16 cwt (17,070 kg) ♣♦ 16 LT 10 cwt (16,760 kg)
  - 4th coupled: ♠♥ 16 LT 16 cwt (17,070 kg) ♣♦ 16 LT 15 cwt (17,020 kg)
  - Trailing: ♠♥ 10 LT 8 cwt (10,570 kg) ♣♦ 9 LT 1 cwt (9,195 kg)
  - Tender axle: 12 LT 14 cwt 2 qtr (12,930 kg) av.
- Adhesive weight: ♠♥ 65 LT (66,040 kg) ♣♦ 65 LT 8 cwt (66,450 kg)
- Loco weight: ♠♥ 91 LT 4 cwt (92,660 kg) ♣♦ 90 LT 11 cwt (92,000 kg)
- Tender weight: 50 LT 18 cwt (51,720 kg)
- Total weight: ♠♥ 142 LT 2 cwt (144,400 kg) ♣♦ 141 LT 9 cwt (143,700 kg)
- Tender type: LP (2-axle bogies)
- Fuel type: Coal
- Fuel capacity: 10 LT (10.2 t)
- Water cap.: 4,250 imp gal (19,300 L)
- Firebox
  - Type: ♠♥ Belpaire - ♣♦ Round-top
  - Grate area: ♠♥♣♦ 37 sq ft (3.437 m^{2})
- Boiler
  - Model: ♣♦ Watson Standard no. 2
  - Pitch: ♠♥ 7 ft 7 in (2,311 mm) ♣♦ 8 ft 1 1/2 in (2,476 mm)
  - Diameter: ♠♥♣♦ 5 ft 7 1/2 in (1,714 mm)
  - Tube plates: ♠♥ 19 ft 3/8 in (5,801 mm) ♣♦ 19 ft 4 in (5,893 mm) steel ♣♦ 19 ft 3 5/8 in (5,883 mm) copper
  - Small tubes: ♠♥ 139: 2 1/4 in (57 mm) ♣♦ 87: 2 1/2 in (64 mm)
  - Large tubes: ♠♥ 24: 5 1/2 in (140 mm) ♣♦ 30: 5 1/2 in (140 mm)
- Boiler pressure: ♠♥♣♦ʘ 190 psi (1,310 kPa) ♠♣ʘ 195 psi (1,344 kPa) ♦ʘ 193 psi (1,331 kPa)
- Safety valve: ♠♥ Ramsbottom- ♣♦ Pop
- Heating surface
  - Firebox: ♠♥ 138 sq ft (12.8 m^{2}) ♣♦ 142 sq ft (13.2 m^{2})
  - Tubes: ♠♥ 2,212 sq ft (205.5 m^{2}) ♣♦ 1,933 sq ft (179.6 m^{2})
  - Total surface: ♠♥ 2,350 sq ft (218 m^{2}) ♣♦ 2,075 sq ft (192.8 m^{2})
- Superheater
  - Heating area: ♠♥ 526 sq ft (48.9 m^{2}) ♣♦ 492 sq ft (45.7 m^{2})
- Cylinders: Two
- Cylinder size: ♠♥♣♦ 22 in (559 mm) bore ♠♣♦ 21 3/4 in (552 mm) bore ♠♥♣♦ 26 in (660 mm) stroke
- Valve gear: Walschaerts
- Valve type: Piston
- Couplers: Johnston link-and-pin AAR knuckle (1930s)
Performance figures
- Tractive effort: ♠♥♣ʘ 37,360 lbf (166 kN) @ 75% ♠♣ʘ 37,480 lbf (166.7 kN) @ 75% ♦ʘ 37,090 lbf (165 kN) @ 75% ♦ʘ 37,950 lbf (168.8 kN) @ 75%
Career
- Operators: South African Railways
- Class: Class 14C, 14CM, 14CR, 14CRM
- Number in class: 13
- Numbers: 2026-2038
- Delivered: 1922
- First run: 1922
- Withdrawn: 1980s
- The leading coupled axle had flangeless wheels

The South African Railways Class 14C 4-8-2 of 1922 was a steam locomotive.

In 1922, the South African Railways placed the fourth and last batch of thirteen Class 14C steam locomotives with a 4-8-2 Mountain type wheel arrangement in service to bring the total in the class to 73. All four batches had different maximum axle loadings. Through reboilerings, rebalancings and cylinder bushings during its service life, this single class eventually ended up as six distinct locomotive classes with two boiler types and a multitude of axle loading and boiler pressure configurations.

== Manufacturer ==
In 1922, the last thirteen Class 14C locomotives were ordered from the Montreal Locomotive Works (MLW) in Canada. They were delivered in that same year and numbered in the range from 2026 to 2038. Of the four batches built which all differed in terms of maximum axle loading, weight on driving wheels and engine weight, the engines of 1922 were the heaviest.

The Class 14C was ordered at a time when further orders of the earlier Class 14 models were unobtainable from manufacturers in the United Kingdom. The Canadian manufacturer undertook to supply engines of equivalent power, wheelbase and weight, but to their own design. As a result, bar frames substituted plate frames and several other important modifications were made.

== Characteristics ==
As built, the locomotives of the fourth batch were heavier than all three previous batches, 6 long tons 7 hundredweight (6,452 kilograms) heavier than the first, 7 long tons 11 hundredweight (7,671 kilograms) heavier than the second and 5 long tons 17 hundredweight (5,944 kilograms) heavier than the third. All four batches were delivered with Type LP tenders with a coal capacity of 10 long tons (10.2 tonnes) and a water capacity of 4,250 imperial gallons (19,300 litres).

== Modifications and reclassifications ==
=== Watson Standard boilers ===
During the 1930s, many serving locomotives were reboilered with a standard boiler type designed by A.G. Watson, CME of the SAR at the time, as part of his standardisation policy. Such Watson Standard reboilered locomotives were reclassified by adding an "R" suffix to their classification.

All thirteen locomotives were eventually reboilered with Watson Standard no. 2 boilers and reclassified to Class 14CR. Only slight alterations were necessary to the engine frames. With the new boilers, the side running boards and platforms were attached to the engine frames instead of to the boilers as in the original design. In the process, the boiler pitch was raised from 7 feet 7 inches (2,311 millimetres) to 8 feet 1 1/2 inches (2,476 millimetres), which raised the chimney height from 12 feet 9 3/8 inches (3,896 millimetres) to 13 feet 3/4 inch (3,981 millimetres). This exceeded the loading gauge height of 13 feet (3,962 millimetres) above the railhead.

Their original Belpaire boilers were fitted with Ramsbottom safety valves, while the Watson Standard boilers were fitted with Pop safety valves. The reboilered engines were also equipped with Watson cabs with their distinctive slanted fronts, compared to the conventional vertical fronts of their original cabs, to allow easier access to the firebox stays. The footplate was also modified to conform to SAR standard practice. Early conversions were equipped with copper and later conversions with steel fireboxes.

=== Rebalancing ===
Around 1930, the question of maximum axle loads for locomotives was thoroughly investigated by the Mechanical and Civil Engineering Departments of the SAR. It was found that, among some other locomotive classes, the Class 14C had a rather severe vertical hammer blow effect on the track when running at speed due to an undue proportion of the reciprocating parts being balanced. Modifications were accordingly made to the Class 14C.

The locomotives had weights attached between the frames to increase adhesion. Over time, most of the Class 14C family of locomotives were "rebalanced" by having these weights increased or reduced to redistribute, increase or reduce the axle loading and adhesive weight, by altering the loads on the individual coupled wheels, leading bogies and trailing pony trucks. Coupled wheel axle loading adjustment was achieved by attaching steel boxes, filled with an appropriate amount of lead, over each axle between the frames.

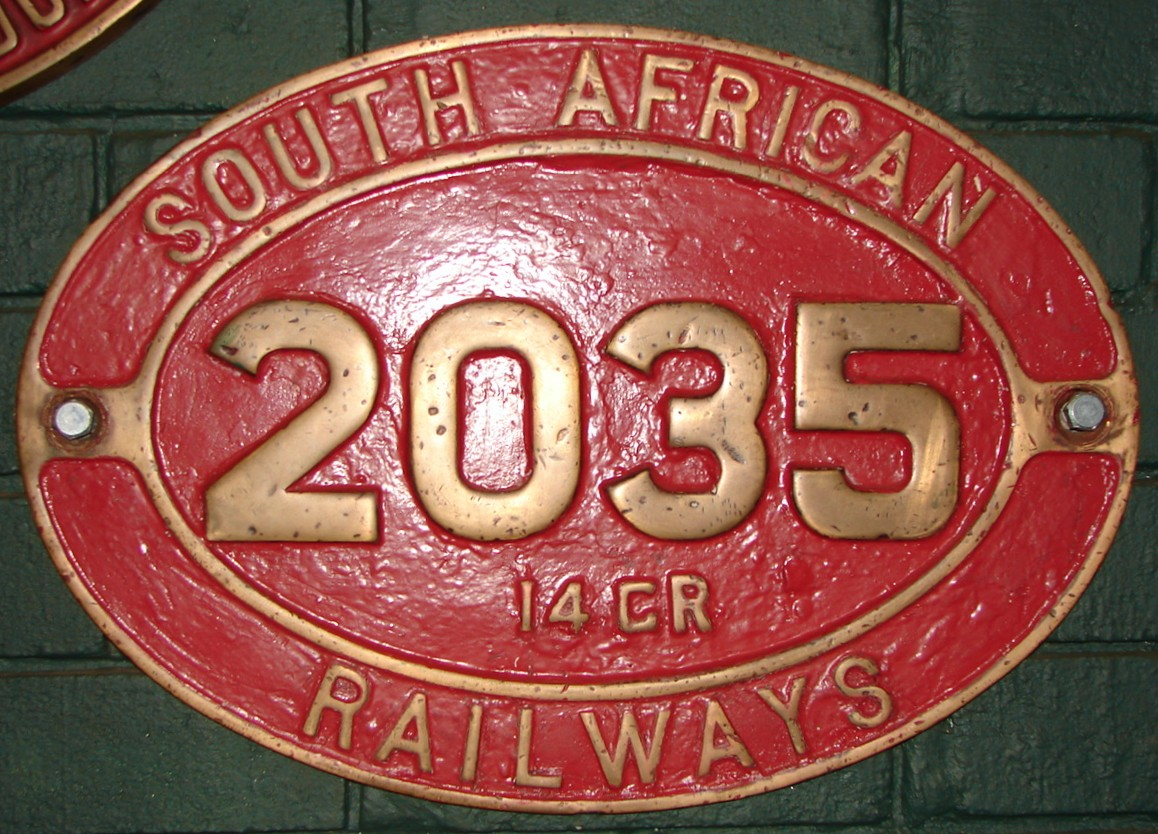

Since they were too heavy for use on light track, the fourth batch version of the rebalanced locomotives was reclassified to Class 14CM, with the "M" indicating mainline service. Twelve of these locomotives, all except no. 2035, were rebalanced and reclassified to Class 14CM. The boiler pressure setting of rebalanced locomotives of the fourth batch was not altered and remained at 190 pounds per square inch (1,310 kilopascals). It is not clear which of these reboilering and rebalancing modifications were carried out first, one, the other, either one or together, but in whichever order, all twelve rebalanced locomotives were eventually also reboilered with Watson Standard no. 2 boilers and reclassified to Class 14CRM.

=== Cylinder bushing ===
Several of the locomotives had their cylinders bushed to reduce the bore from the as-built 22 to 21 3/4 inches (559 to 552 millimetres). At the same time, the boiler pressure setting of the Classes 14C and 14CR locomotives was adjusted upwards from 190 to 195 pounds per square inch (1,310 to 1,344 kilopascals) to keep their tractive effort more or less unaffected by the reduction in piston diameter. The boiler pressure setting of the mainline Classes 14CM and 14CRM was adjusted upwards from 190 to 193 pounds per square inch (1,310 to 1,331 kilopascals).

== Service ==
The Class 14C was placed in service on the Cape Eastern system, working on the mainline to Cookhouse. Some went to the Cape Western system, where they banked up the Hex River Pass from De Doorns.

== Works numbers ==
The table lists their years built, manufacturer's works numbers, engine numbers and eventual classifications.

Class 14C 4-8-2, fourth batch
Year	Works no.	Engine no.	Class
1922	63078	2026	14CRM
1922	63079	2027	14CRM
1922	63080	2028	14CRM
1922	63081	2029	14CRM
1922	63082	2030	14CRM
1922	63083	2031	14CRM
1922	63084	2032	14CRM
1922	63085	2033	14CRM
1922	63086	2034	14CRM
1922	63087	2035	14CR
1922	63075	2036	14CRM
1922	63076	2037	14CRM
1922	63077	2038	14CRM
