= South African Class 14C 4-8-2, 2nd batch =

1919 design of steam locomotive

South African Class 14C, 14CB, 14CR & 14CRB 4-8-2, 2nd batch
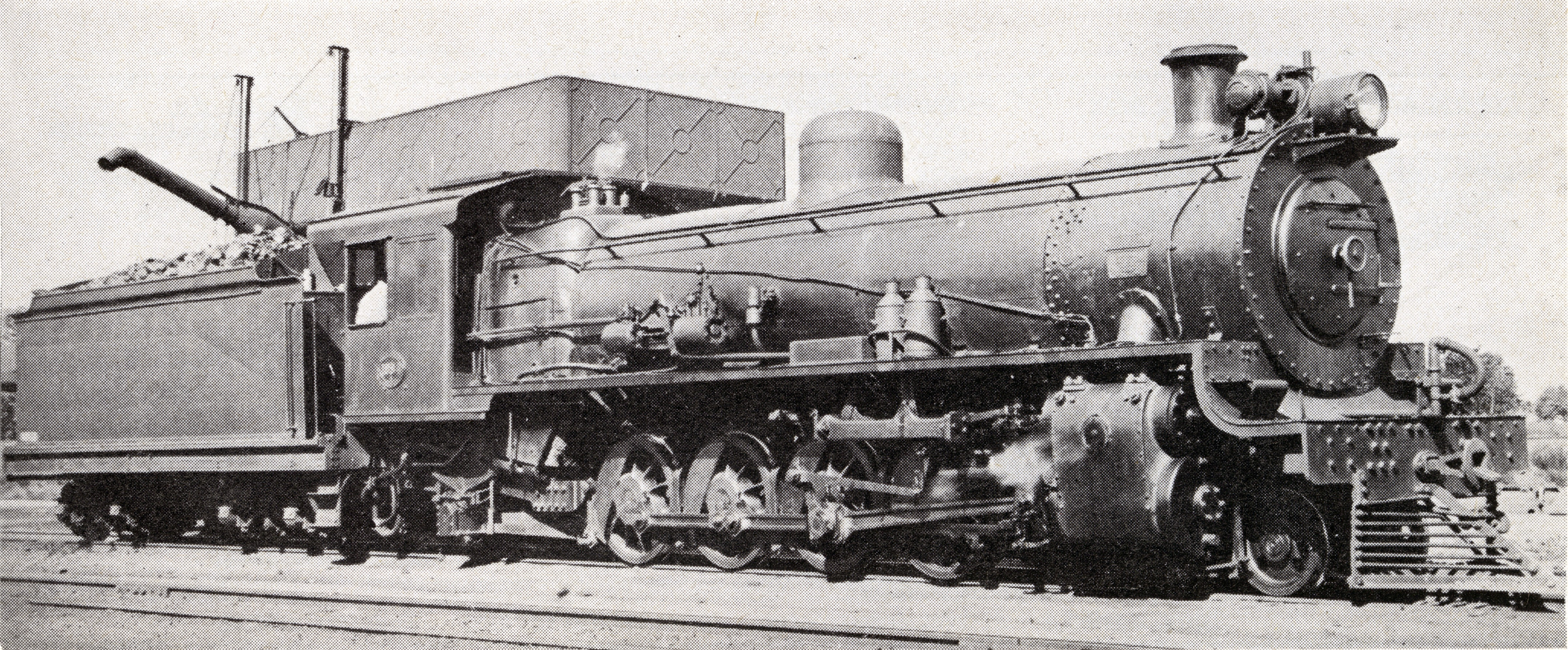
- No. 1894, as built with a Belpaire firebox, c. 1945
Type and origin
- ♠ Class 14C, standard, as built with a Belpaire firebox ♥ Class 14CB, rebalanced for branchline working ♣ Class 14CR, standard, Watson Standard boiler ♦ Class 14CRB, branchline, Watson Standard boiler ʘ 22 in (559 mm) bore - ʘ 21 3/4 in (552 mm) bore
- Power type: Steam
- Designer: Montreal Locomotive Works
- Builder: Montreal Locomotive Works
- Serial number: 60255-60274
- Model: Class 14C
- Build date: 1919
- Total produced: 20
Specifications
- Configuration
  - Whyte: 4-8-2 (Mountain)
  - UIC: 2'D1'h2
- Driver: 2nd coupled axle
- Gauge: 3 ft 6 in (1,067 mm) Cape gauge
- Leading dia.: 28 1/2 in (724 mm)
- Coupled dia.: 48 in (1,219 mm)
- Trailing dia.: 33 in (838 mm)
- Tender wheels: 34 in (864 mm)
- Wheelbase: 59 ft 1/4 in (17,990 mm)
  - Engine: 30 ft 8 in (9,347 mm)
  - Leading: 6 ft 2 in (1,880 mm)
  - Coupled: 12 ft 9 in (3,886 mm)
  - Tender: 17 ft 11 in (5,461 mm)
  - Tender bogie: 4 ft 7 in (1,397 mm)
- Length
  - Over couplers: 66 ft 10 1/8 in (20,374 mm)
- Height: ♠♥ 12 ft 9 3/8 in (3,896 mm) ♣♦ 13 ft 3/4 in (3,981 mm)
- Frame type: Bar
- Axle load: ♠ 15 LT 16 cwt (16,050 kg) ♥ 14 LT 14 cwt (14,940 kg) ♣ 16 LT 15 cwt (17,020 kg) ♦ 14 LT 15 cwt (14,990 kg)
  - Leading: ♠ 13 LT 7 cwt (13,560 kg) ♥ 14 LT 13 cwt (14,890 kg) ♣ 16 LT 2 cwt (16,360 kg) ♦ 14 LT 14 cwt (14,940 kg)
  - 1st coupled: ♠ 15 LT 9 cwt (15,700 kg) ♥ 14 LT 14 cwt (14,940 kg) ♣ 16 LT 8 cwt (16,660 kg) ♦ 14 LT 15 cwt (14,990 kg)
  - 2nd coupled: ♠ 14 LT 18 cwt (15,140 kg) ♥ 14 LT 12 cwt (14,830 kg) ♣ 15 LT 15 cwt (16,000 kg) ♦ 14 LT 13 cwt (14,890 kg)
  - 3rd coupled: ♠ 15 LT 12 cwt (15,850 kg) ♥ 14 LT 13 cwt (14,890 kg) ♣ 16 LT 10 cwt (16,760 kg) ♦ 14 LT 13 cwt (14,890 kg)
  - 4th coupled: ♠ 15 LT 16 cwt (16,050 kg) ♥ 14 LT 14 cwt (14,940 kg) ♣ 16 LT 15 cwt (17,020 kg) ♦ 14 LT 15 cwt (14,990 kg)
  - Trailing: ♠ 8 LT 11 cwt (8,687 kg) ♥ 10 LT (10,160 kg) ♣ 9 LT 1 cwt (9,195 kg) ♦ 10 LT (10,160 kg)
  - Tender axle: 12 LT 14 cwt 2 qtr (12,930 kg) av.
- Adhesive weight: ♠ 61 LT 15 cwt (62,740 kg) ♥ 58 LT 13 cwt (59,590 kg) ♣ 65 LT 8 cwt (66,450 kg) ♦ 58 LT 16 cwt (59,740 kg)
- Loco weight: ♠ 83 LT 13 cwt (84,990 kg) ♥ 83 LT 6 cwt (84,640 kg) ♣ 90 LT 11 cwt (92,000 kg) ♦ 83 LT 10 cwt (84,840 kg)
- Tender weight: 50 LT 18 cwt (51,720 kg)
- Total weight: ♠ 134 LT 11 cwt (136,700 kg) ♥ 134 LT 4 cwt (136,400 kg) ♣ 141 LT 9 cwt (143,700 kg) ♦ 134 LT 8 cwt (136,600 kg)
- Tender type: LP (2-axle bogies)
- Fuel type: Coal
- Fuel capacity: 10 LT (10.2 t)
- Water cap.: 4,250 imp gal (19,300 L)
- Firebox
  - Type: ♠♥ Belpaire - ♣♦ Round-top
  - Grate area: ♠♥♣♦ 37 sq ft (3.437 m^{2})
- Boiler
  - Model: ♣♦ Watson Standard no. 2
  - Pitch: ♠♥ 7 ft 7 in (2,311 mm) ♣♦ 8 ft 1 1/2 in (2,476 mm)
  - Diameter: ♠♥♣♦ 5 ft 7 1/2 in (1,714 mm)
  - Tube plates: ♠♥ 19 ft 3/8 in (5,801 mm) ♣♦ 19 ft 4 in (5,893 mm) steel ♣♦ 19 ft 3 5/8 in (5,883 mm) copper
  - Small tubes: ♠♥ 139: 2 1/4 in (57 mm) ♣♦ 87: 2 1/2 in (64 mm)
  - Large tubes: ♠♥ 24: 5 1/2 in (140 mm) ♣♦ 30: 5 1/2 in (140 mm)
- Boiler pressure: ♠♣ʘ 190 psi (1,310 kPa) ♠♣ʘ 195 psi (1,344 kPa) ♥♦ʘ 180 psi (1,241 kPa) ♦ʘ 183 psi (1,262 kPa)
- Safety valve: ♠♥ Ramsbottom - ♣♦ Pop
- Heating surface
  - Firebox: ♠♥ 138 sq ft (12.8 m^{2}) ♣♦ 142 sq ft (13.2 m^{2})
  - Tubes: ♠♥ 2,212 sq ft (205.5 m^{2}) ♣♦ 1,933 sq ft (179.6 m^{2})
  - Total surface: ♠♥ 2,350 sq ft (218 m^{2}) ♣♦ 2,075 sq ft (192.8 m^{2})
- Superheater
  - Heating area: ♠♥ 526 sq ft (48.9 m^{2}) ♣♦ 492 sq ft (45.7 m^{2})
- Cylinders: Two
- Cylinder size: ♠♥♣♦ 22 in (559 mm) bore ♠♣♦ 21 3/4 in (552 mm) bore ♠♥♣♦ 26 in (660 mm) stroke
- Valve gear: Walschaerts
- Valve type: Piston
- Couplers: Johnston link-and-pin AAR knuckle (1930s)
Performance figures
- Tractive effort: ♠♣ʘ 37,360 lbf (166.2 kN) @ 75% ♠♣ʘ 37,480 lbf (166.7 kN) @ 75% ♥ʘ 35,400 lbf (157 kN) @ 75% ♦ʘ 35,980 lbf (160.0 kN) @ 75% ♦ʘ 35,170 lbf (156.4 kN) @ 75%
Career
- Operators: South African Railways
- Class: Class 14C, 14CB, 14CR, 14CRB
- Number in class: 20
- Numbers: 1881-1900
- Delivered: 1919
- First run: 1919
- Withdrawn: 1980s
- The leading coupled axle had flangeless wheels

The South African Railways Class 14C 4-8-2 of 1919 was a steam locomotive.

In 1919, the South African Railways placed a second batch of twenty Class 14C steam locomotives with a 4-8-2 Mountain type wheel arrangement in service. In addition to the first two batches, two more batches were acquired between 1919 and 1922, each with a different maximum axle loading, to bring the total in the class to 73. Through reboilerings, rebalancings and cylinder bushings during its service life, this single class eventually ended up as six distinct locomotive classes with two boiler types and a multitude of axle load and boiler pressure configurations.

== Manufacturer ==
In 1919, the second batch of twenty Class 14C locomotives was also ordered from the Montreal Locomotive Works (MLW) in Canada. It was delivered in that same year and numbered in the range from 1881 to 1900. Until 1922, two more batches of Class 14C locomotives would follow from the same manufacturer. All four batches differed in terms of maximum axle loading, adhesive weight and engine weight.

== Characteristics ==
The locomotive design followed North American practice in many ways and their appearance was typically American, with high running boards and large cabs. They had bar frames, Walschaerts valve gear, Belpaire fireboxes and were superheated.

As built, the locomotives of the second batch were 1 long ton 4 hundredweight (1,219 kilograms) lighter than those of the first batch. All four batches were delivered with Type LP tenders with a coal capacity of 10 long tons (10.2 tonnes) and a water capacity of 4,250 imperial gallons (19,300 litres).

== Modifications and reclassifications ==
The Class 14C proved to be good locomotives, even though they initially suffered from some serious teething troubles. During 1920, it was found necessary to restay most of the fireboxes on the early orders of the Class 14C. Their reversing gear was of the single cylinder type and tended to creep. D.A. Hendrie, at the time the Chief Mechanical Engineer (CME) of the South African Railways (SAR), therefore fitted oil cylinders and installed his Hendrie reversing gear, which was manufactured in the Pretoria workshops during 1922. Modifications were also made to the finger bars and rocking grate cylinders of the firebox and to the sanding gear. Approximately 2 long tons (2.0 tonnes) of lead were run into the smokebox saddle casting to provide additional weight on the leading bogie.

=== Watson Standard boilers ===
During the 1930s, many serving locomotives were reboilered with a standard boiler type designed by A.G. Watson, CME of the SAR at the time, as part of his standardisation policy. Such Watson Standard reboilered locomotives were reclassified by adding an "R" suffix to their classification.

Nineteen of the second batch locomotives, all except no. 1891, were eventually reboilered with Watson Standard no. 2 boilers and reclassified to Class 14CR. Only slight alterations were necessary to the engine frames. In the process, the boiler pitch was raised from 7 feet 7 inches (2,311 millimetres) to 8 feet 1 1/2 inches (2,476 millimetres). This raised the chimney height from 12 feet 9 3/8 inches (3,896 millimetres) to 13 feet 3/4 inch (3,981 millimetres) and exceeded the loading gauge height of 13 feet (3,962 millimetres) above the railhead.

The reboilered engines were also equipped with Watson cabs with their distinctive slanted fronts, compared to the conventional vertical fronts of their original cabs. Early conversions were equipped with copper and later conversions with steel fireboxes. Two of them, numbers 1894 and 1898, would not undergo further modifications and would retain the Class 14CR designation until they were withdrawn from service.

The original Belpaire boiler was fitted with Ramsbottom safety valves, while the Watson Standard boiler was fitted with Pop safety valves.

=== Rebalancing ===
Around 1930, the question of maximum axle loads for locomotives was thoroughly investigated by the Mechanical and Civil Engineering Departments of the SAR. It was found that, along with some other locomotive classes, the Class 14C had a rather severe vertical hammer blow effect on the track when running at speed due to an undue proportion of the reciprocating parts being balanced. Modifications were accordingly made to the Class 14C to allow some of them to run on 60 pounds per yard (30 kilograms per metre) track.

The locomotives had weights attached between the frames to increase adhesion. Over time, most of the Class 14C family of locomotives were "rebalanced" by having these weights increased or reduced to redistribute, increase or reduce the axle loading and adhesive weight by altering the loads on the individual coupled wheels, leading bogies and trailing pony trucks. Coupled wheel axle loading adjustment was achieved by attaching steel boxes filled with an appropriate amount of lead over each axle between the frames.

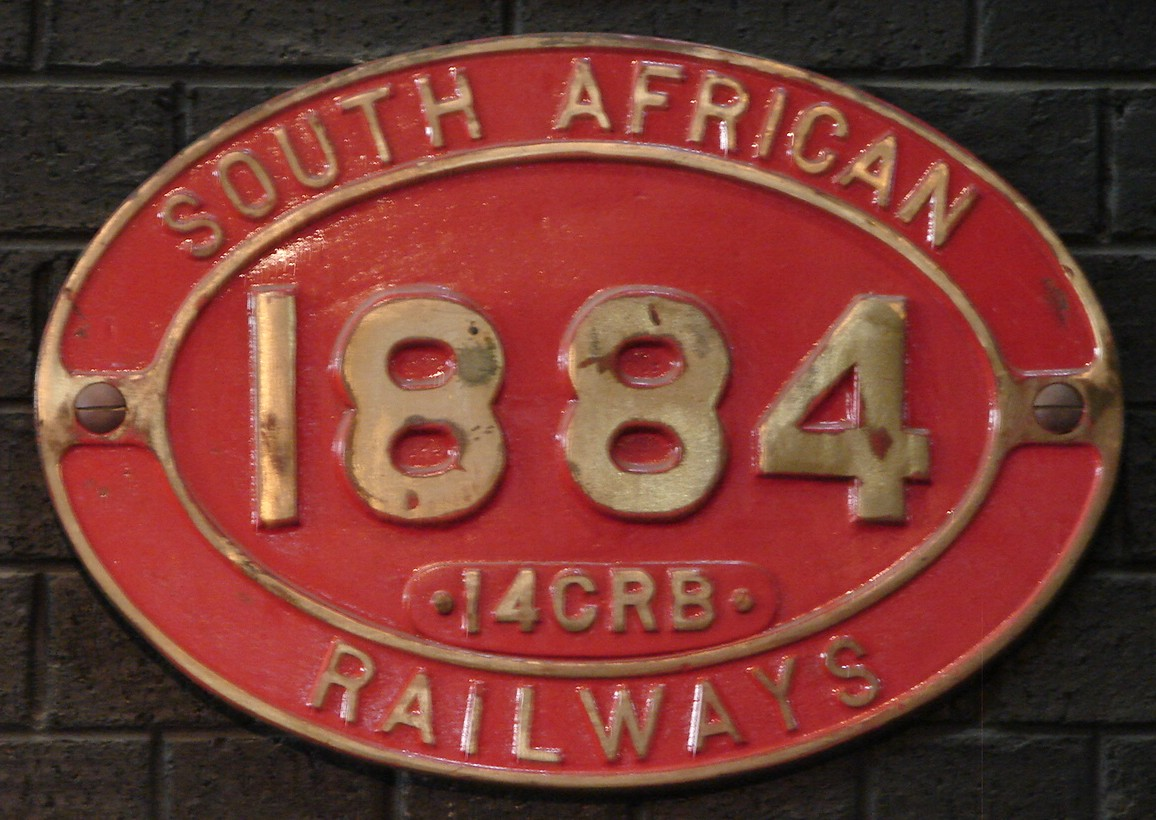

The lighter version of the rebalanced locomotives was reclassified to Class 14CB, with the "B" indicating branchline service. Those which were also reboilered with Watson Standard no. 2 boilers were reclassified to Class 14CRB. Reclassified Class 14C locomotives often did not receive new number plates. Instead, the previous Class number was milled out and a separate small plate, inscribed with the new Class number and "R" suffix, was attached to the number plate.

=== Cylinder bushing ===
Several of the locomotives had their cylinders bushed to reduce the bore from the as-built 22 to 21 3/4 inches (559 to 552 millimetres). At the same time, the boiler pressure setting of the Classes 14C and 14CR locomotives was adjusted upwards from 190 to 195 pounds per square inch (1,310 to 1,344 kilopascals) to keep their tractive effort more or less unaffected by the reduction in piston diameter. The boiler pressure setting of the branchline Classes 14CB and 14CRB was adjusted upwards from 180 to 183 pounds per square inch (1,241 to 1,262 kilopascals).

== Service ==
The Class 14C was placed in service on the Cape Eastern system, working the Umtata branch into Transkei and on the mainline to Cookhouse. Some went to the Cape Western system where they banked up the Hex River Pass from De Doorns and later worked with Class 19C locomotives across Sir Lowry's Pass to Caledon and Bredasdorp in the Overberg. A few were also used on the Cape Midland system, in Natal and Eastern Transvaal.

In their later years, many of these locomotives remained on the Cape Western system, most being shedded at Paardeneiland in Cape Town and at Beaufort West, and one at De Aar, mostly being used as shunting engines and on short local pick-ups. A large number were also used on the Cape Eastern system, shedded at East London and used as shunting engines, on local pick-ups and also in suburban service. A few also served their last years in Eastern Transvaal, shedded at Pietersburg and Witbank.

== Works numbers ==
The table lists their years built, manufacturer's works numbers, engine numbers and eventual classifications.

Class 14C 4-8-2, second batch
Year	Works no.	Engine no.	Class
1919	60255	1881	14CRB
1919	60256	1882	14CRB
1919	60257	1883	14CRB
1919	60258	1884	14CRB
1919	60259	1885	14CRB
1919	60260	1886	14CRB
1919	60261	1887	14CRB
1919	60262	1888	14CRB
1919	60263	1889	14CRB
1919	60264	1890	14CRB
1919	60265	1891	14C
1919	60266	1892	14CRB
1919	60267	1893	14CRB
1919	60268	1894	14CR
1919	60269	1895	14CRB
1919	60270	1896	14CRB
1919	60271	1897	14CRB
1919	60272	1898	14CR
1919	60273	1899	14CRB
1919	60274	1900	14CRB

== Illustration ==
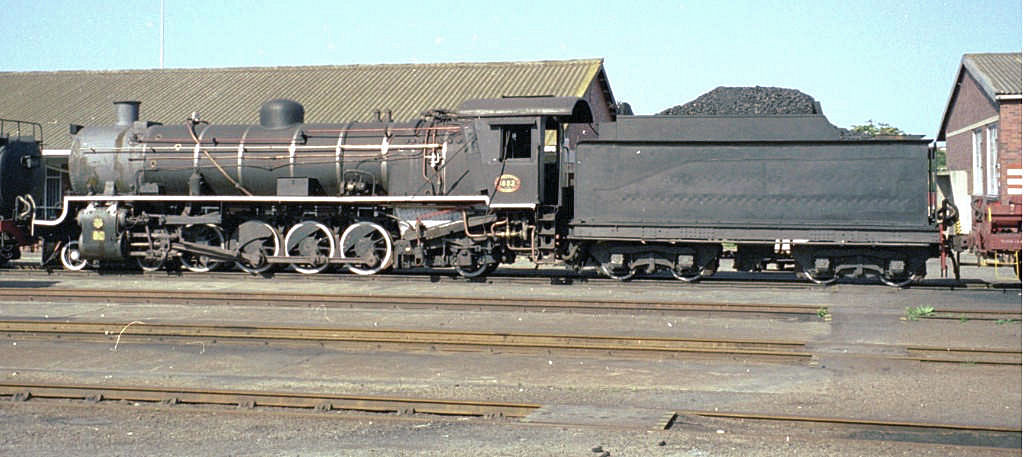
Class 14CRB no. 1882 at Voorbaai, 4 September 1997

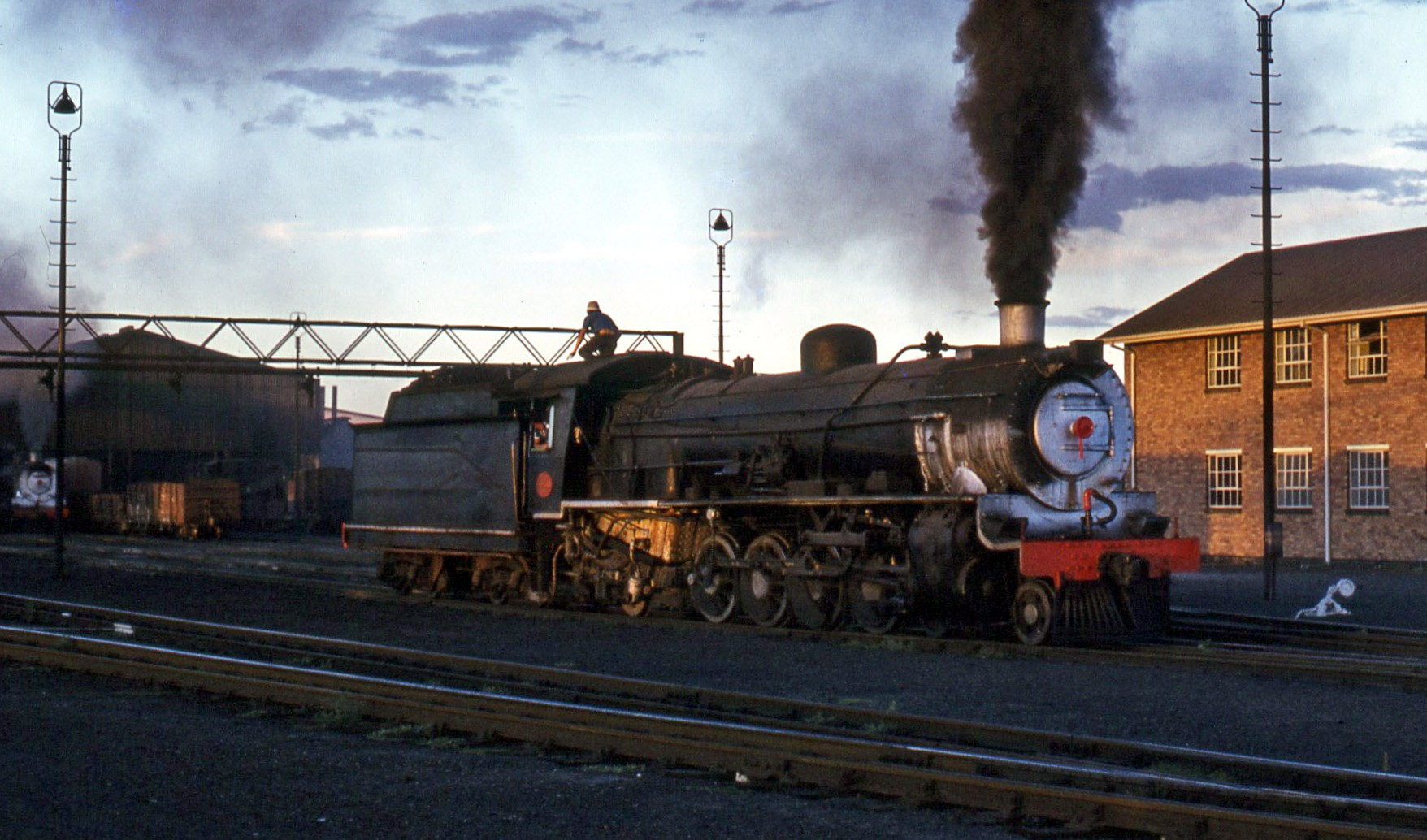
Class 14CRB no. 1900 at Beaufort West, 13 April 1981
