= Hex River Pass =

Coordinates: 33°24′05.9″S 19°45′34.9″E

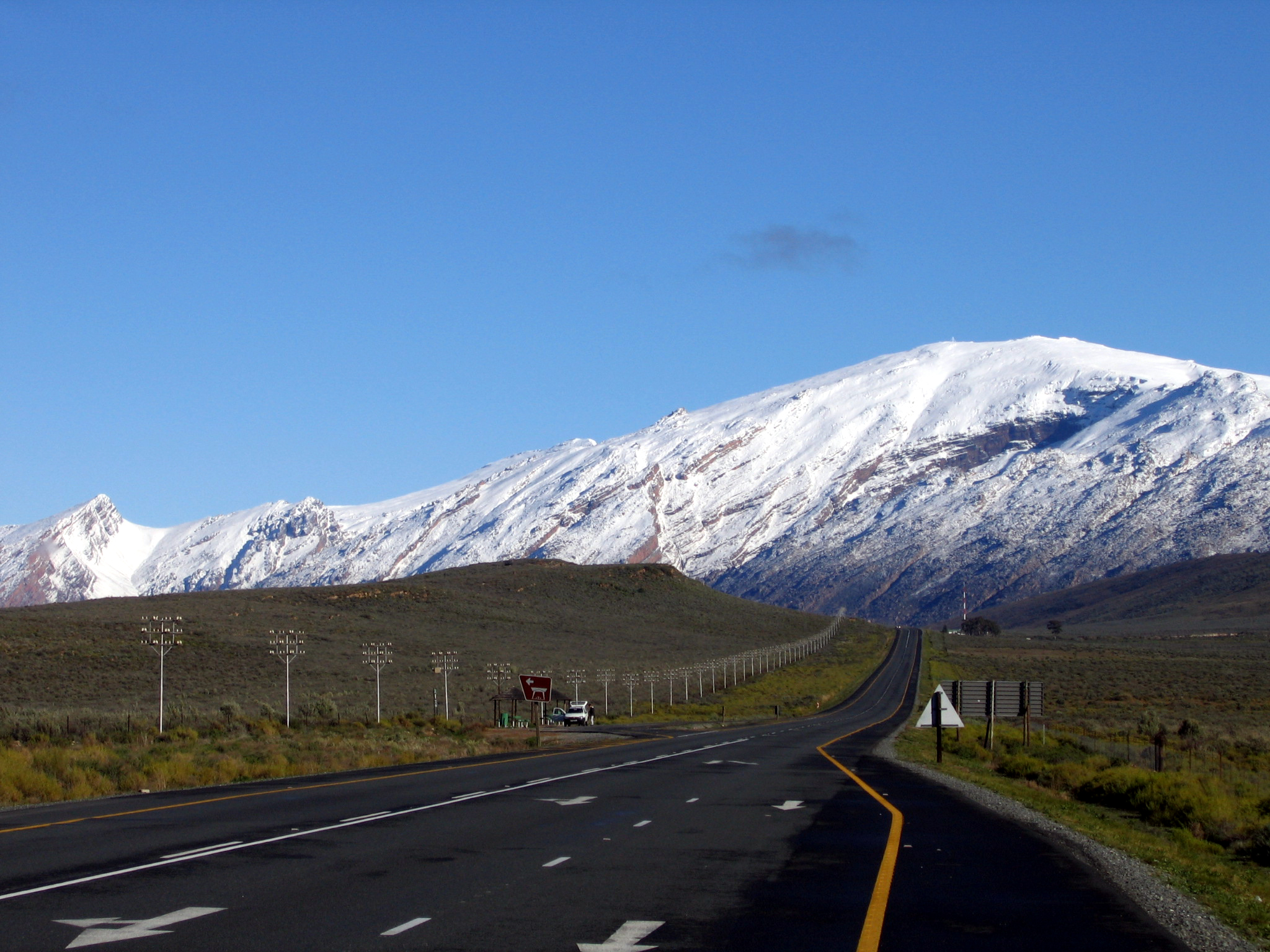

Hex River Pass is a pass on the N1 national road, between De Doorns and Touws River in the Western Cape province of South Africa.

== See also ==
- Hex River Mountains
- Hex River Tunnels
