= New York Central Niagara =

Class of American 4-8-4 locomotives

- NYC Niagara No. 6015 in Indianapolis, Indiana, June 30, 1956, soon before retirement
Type and origin
- Power type: Steam
- Designer: Paul W. Kiefer
- Builder: Alco-Schenectady (ALCO)
- Build date: 1945–1946
- Total produced: 27
Specifications
- Configuration
  - Whyte: 4-8-4
- Gauge: 4 ft 8 1/2 in (1,435 mm)
- Leading dia.: 36 in (914 mm)
- Driver dia.: 79 in (2,007 mm)
- Trailing dia.: 41 in (1,041 mm)
- Minimum curve: 18°
- Length: 115 ft 5 1/2 in (35.19 m)
- Width: 10 ft 8 in (3.25 m)
- Height: 15 ft 2 3/4 in (4.64 m)
- Axle load: 68,750 lb (31,184.5 kg; 31.2 t)
- Adhesive weight: 275,000 lb (124,737.9 kg; 124.7 t)
- Loco weight: 471,000 lb (213,642.0 kg; 213.6 t)
- Tender weight: 420,000 lb (190,508.8 kg; 190.5 t)
- Total weight: 891,000 lb (404,000 kg; 404 t)
- Fuel type: Coal
- Fuel capacity: 92,000 lb (42,000 kg; 41 long tons)
- Water cap.: 18,000 US gal (68,000 L; 15,000 imp gal)
- Fuel consumption: 1 short ton (0.89 long tons) of coal per roughly 15 miles traveled (1 metric ton per 27 km)
- Boiler: 100 in (2,540 mm)
- Boiler pressure: 275 psi (1.90 MPa)
- Cylinders: Two
- Cylinder size: 25.5 in × 32 in (648 mm × 813 mm)
- Valve gear: Baker (No. 5500 Equipped With Franklin A1 Poppet Valve Gear)
Performance figures
- Maximum speed: 120 mph (190 km/h)
- Power output: 5,070 hp (3,780 kW) at 62.5 mph (100.6 km/h)
- Tractive effort: 61,568 lbf (273.9 kN)
- Factor of adh.: 4.47
Career
- Operators: New York Central Railroad
- Class: S-1a, S-1b, S-2a
- Number in class: S-1a (1), S-1b (25); S-2a (1)
- Numbers: 6000 (S-1a); 6001–6025 (S-1b); 5500 (S-2a)
- Retired: 1951-1956
- Disposition: All scrapped

The New York Central Railroad's Niagara were three classes of 27 4-8-4 steam locomotives built by the American Locomotive Company for the New York Central Railroad. Like many railroads that adopted different names for their 4-8-4s rather than “Northerns”, the New York Central named them “Niagaras”, after the Niagara River and Falls.

The first Niagara was ordered in 1931: No. 800, an experimental locomotive that had its boiler divided into three sections of different pressure. This was another failed experiment in high pressure steam locomotives.

By the 1940s, loads being hauled on the New York Central main line from New York to Chicago were as much as the famous J-class NYC Hudson 4-6-4's could handle. The Chief of Motive Power for the railroad, Paul W. Kiefer, decided to order some 4-8-4's which could sustain 6,000 horsepower (4,500 kW) on the run between the two cities many days in a row with little maintenance.

The American Locomotive Company (ALCO) proposed these locomotives, and although the class took inspiration from the Union Pacific FEF Class 4-8-4's, the design was actually quite new. Some experts have claimed the Niagara to be the ultimate locomotive, as it had the speed of a Union Pacific FEF and the power of Northerns with smaller driver wheels.

== Locomotive details ==
The first Niagara was Class S-1a No. 6000, delivered in March, 1945; the S-1b's (6001-6025) were delivered in 1945 and 1946. All S-1's were equipped with Baker valve gear, but S-1a No. 6000 was built with 75 in (1,905 mm) driving wheels. It later received 79 in (2,007 mm) wheels like the S-1b's were built with, as well as an increased boiler pressure of 290 psi (2,000 kPa). This was to maintain the S-1a's initially higher tractive effort and compare boiler efficiencies with the S-1b.

The last Niagara, also delivered in 1946 as the New York Central's last steam locomotive, was Class S-2a No. 5500, dubbed the "Super Niagara." The locomotive was mechanically identical to the S-1b's, but instead of Baker gear and piston valves, it had Franklin oscillating-cam poppet valves. This application of the "Franklin System of Steam Distribution" was very similar to the existing Type A, but a different valve layout lead to the official designation of FSSD or Franklin Type A1. The Niagaras did not have steam domes, as did most steam locomotives, which resulted in a smooth contour along the top of the boiler. A perforated pipe collected steam instead. This was necessary because of the lower loading gauge (height clearance restrictions) of the New York Central (15 ft 2 in (4.62 m) versus 16 ft 2 in (4.93 m) for other American railroads), particularly east of Buffalo.

These locomotives had a small water capacity (18,000 US gal (68,000 L)) in the tender, because the New York Central was one of the few railroads in North America which used track pans. This allowed a larger coal capacity (46 short tons (42 t)) so the Harmon, New York to Chicago run (928.1 mi (1,493.6 km)) could be done with one stop for coal. The stop was at Wayneport, New York: 14 mi (23 km) east of Rochester, which left 602.2 mi (969.1 km) to Chicago via the Cleveland lakefront. This worked with the 46-ton coal capacity of the PT tenders, though coal was fairly low in the tenders by the time La Salle Station was reached, with an approximate mileage of 15 mi/short ton (27 km/t) of coal for such a high-horsepower steam locomotive. To fit within the existing turntables, the tender had an overhang of over 9 ft (2.7 m) beyond the last pair of wheels.

On test these locomotives reached 6,600 hp (4,900 kW) in the cylinders, and ran 26,000 mi (42,000 km) miles per month.

- Cylinders:
- Bore and stroke: 25 1/2 in × 32 in (650 mm × 810 mm)
- Driving wheel diameter: 79 inches (2.0 m)
- Boiler pressure: 275 psi (1,900 kPa)
- Tractive effort: 61,570 lbf (273.9 kN)
- Axle load: 32 long tons (32.5 t)
- Valve gear: Baker valve gear
- Total length: 115 feet 5 1/2 inches (35.192 m)
- Total weight: 405 long tons (411 t)

All bearings were either roller bearings or needle rollers.

== Maintenance ==
The six days per week running schedule of these locomotives meant that all of the maintenance work normally done over the course of that week would have to be done on one day. This meant a specialized system was developed, where men in "hot suits" (asbestos heat-resistant coveralls) entered the firebox while the locomotive was still in steam and cleared all of the tubes, repaired the brick arch, etc. As the temperature inside the firebox itself would have been well over 212 °F (100 °C) and the working area was the still-hot firebars of the grate, all references describe these workers as 'heroic'.

This type of intensive maintenance was studied by steam locomotive designers such as Andre Chapelon, Livio Dante Porta and David Wardale. These designers based their modern steam locomotives on the experience gained with these Niagara-class locomotives: reliability and a close attention to details, leading to a reduction in maintenance costs.

All 27 locomotives received weekly maintenance at Harmon, while overhauls were carried out at Beech Grove in Indiana. Despite the size limitations imposed on the design, the Niagaras were the largest locomotives on the New York Central, and Beech Grove was the only shop on the railroad that could accommodate them. Their high utilization resulted in somewhat frequent overhauls. 1950 and 1951 each saw 15 Niagaras overhauled, but the total number of overhauls undertaken in the former year was 16 due to S-1b No. 6006 receiving Class 3 repairs twice during that year. The last general overhauls were completed by Beech Grove in 1953, the year steam was displaced from Harmon and the Eastern Lines of the system.

== The 1946 steam-versus-diesel trials ==
Six of these locomotives were chosen by their designer, Paul W. Kiefer, for the famous 1946 Steam Versus Diesel road trials, where the 6,000 hp (4,500 kW) Niagaras were put up against some 4,000 hp (3,000 kW) diesels (E7's). The locomotives were run along the 928.1 miles (1,493.6 km) from New York (Harmon) to Chicago, via Albany, Syracuse, Rochester, Buffalo, Cleveland, Toledo and Elkhart, and return. The results were close:

Cost comparison Steam versus diesel, 1946 NYC road trials Running from New York (Harmon) to Chicago (928.1 miles or 1,493.6 km) and return Note: dollar figures quoted in 1946 US dollars. To get 2019 US dollar figures, multiply by 13.17
	Steam S-1 'Niagara' (six locomotives)		Diesel E7 4,000 bhp two unit (six locomotives)		Diesel E7 6,000 bhp Three Unit (estimated by New York Central)	
Approximate relative first costs (as at December, 1946)	100%		147%		214%	
Total drawbar horsepower	5,000 hp		3,320 dbhp		4,980 dbhp	
Relative first cost, in dollars per horsepower	100%		265%		258%	
Total annual mileage per locomotive	288,000 (310 trips per annum)		324,000 (349 trips per annum)		324,000 (349 trips per annum)	
COST PER LOCOMOTIVE	Actual	As percentage of total	Actual	As percentage of total	Estimated (by New; York Central)	As percentage of total
Repairs	$102,528	31.48%	$114,048	35.6%	$162,000	38.4%
Fuel	$118,080	36.26%	$90,720	28.3%	$136,080	32.3%
Water	$8,928	2.74%	$1,296	0.4%	$1,620	0.4%
Lubrication	$3,168	0.97%	$9,720	3.0%	$14,580	3.5%
Other Supplies	$1,440	0.44%	$648	0.2%	$648	0.2%
Enginehouse Expense	$28,800	8.84%	$32,400	10.1%	$32,400	7.7%
Crew Wages (Two men)	$55,987	17.19%	$64,120	20.0%	$66,290	15.7%
Vacation Allowance (3%)	$1,670	0.51%	$1,912	0.6%	$1,976	0.5%
Social Security & Unemployment Tax (8.75%)	$5,040	1.55%	$5,767	1.8%	$5,962	1.4%
Total Cost Per Mile (Operating)	$1.1307		$0.9896		$1.3011	
Total Annual Operating Cost	$325,642		$320,630		$421,556	
Fixed Charges (Interest, depreciation, insurance)	$24,453		$38,841		$56,640	
Total Annual Cost Per Locomotive	$350,095		$359,471		$478,196	
Total Annual Cost Per Mile Per Locomotive	$1.22		$1.11		$1.48	
Total Annual Cost Per Locomotive Drawbar Horsepower	$58.35		$108.27		$96.02	

(Note that Kiefer only claimed 5050 drawbar horsepower from a 79-inch 4-8-4, and the last line (dollars/power) has been added)

The results were much closer than the diesel salesmen were comfortable with, but these steam locomotives were hampered by several factors: a series of coal miners' strikes; aggressive dieselization sales efforts; and a failure of the highly-expensive firebox-wrapper metallurgy to withstand the conditions of actual operation.

== Planned duplex drive variant ==
A 4-4-4-4 duplex drive steam locomotive based on the Niagara was planned as a true competitor to the Pennsylvania Railroad’s T1, called the C-1a, which was never built. The C-1a would have had a larger coal capacity, increased from 46 to 64 tons, an overall length of 123 ft 1 1/4 in (37.52 m), an overall wheelbase of 104 ft 2 1/2 in (31.76 m), an overall weight of 970,400 lb (440.17 t), a slightly-longer PT-class centipede tender with a required extra axle, the same amount of weight on drivers, four 20 in × 26 in (508 mm × 660 mm) cylinders, boiler pressure of 290 lbf/in^{2} (2.00 MPa) and a tractive effort rating of 64,901 lbf (288.7 kN).

== Disposition ==
Upon dieselization, the entire series was retired and scrapped between late 1955 and July 1956, with #6015 the last withdrawn (S2a #5500 was retired earlier, in 1951, and served as a spare-parts supply for the other Niagaras until 1956). The reason that no NYC Niagara locomotives were preserved is because of the order of then-NYC President Alfred E. Perlman, who similarly ordered that every NYC Hudson be scrapped, albeit not completely due to opposing preservation. The financial situation of the New York Central was critical when Perlman became the chairman, and the scrap value of all the steam locomotives was enough to bring the railroad back from the brink. His decision to scrap the entirety of the NYC's steam fleet (and later mostly those of the Denver & Rio Grande Western's standard gauge) has earned him an infamous reputation as a steam hater and anti-preservationist. This was not entirely true, however, as later on he did personally donate Mohawk #2933 and 4-4-0 #999. As the NYC gained less than $15,000 in scrap value from Luria Brothers for each Niagara, which cost about $248,000 each in 1945, their early retirement was a net loss overall.

== Gallery ==
Photo of 5500

Photo of 6008: tender overhang is clearly visible

== Replicas ==
- Completed in 1998 after 25 years construction, an accurate live steam replica 1/5 scale 10 1/4 in (260 mm) gauge model of 6019 is the largest known example of this extinct class in the world and works alongside a 1/5 scale NKP Berkshire at the private Stapleford Miniature Railway in the UK.

== See also ==
- Pennsylvania Railroad class T1
