= Paul W. Kiefer =

Paul Walter Kiefer (February 13, 1888 – September 2, 1968) was an American mechanical engineer, locomotive designer, chief engineer at New York Central Railroad, and inventor, who was awarded the 1947 ASME Medal.

== Biography ==
Kiefer was born in Delaware, Ohio as son of Jacob Kiefer and Lena (Maler) Kiefer. After attending public schools in Delaware and Glenville, Ohio, he started his career in industry. He continued his studies at night schools at the Cleveland Institute of Art and in New York, where he studied locomotive and car design.

Kiefer made his career in the railway industry, and became chief engineer at New York Central Railroad. Kiefer designed several locomotives, including the Hudson, later Mohawk designs, Niagara and the Pittsburgh and Lake Erie Railroad’s berkshires. He retired as chief engineer of equipment from the New York Central System in 1953. In 1946 he was awarded an Honorary Degree in Mechanical Engineer, and in 1947 the ASME awarded him the annual ASME Medal.

He died on September 2, 1968 at his home.

== Selected publications ==
- Paul W. Kiefer .A practical evaluation of railroad motive power, Simmons-Boardman, 1947.

Patents, a selection

- Patent US1841480 - Cast metal hopper for railway cars, 1932.
