= Lackawanna Limited wreck =

1943 train wreck in New York State, U.S.

Wayland train wreck

Details
- Date: August 30, 1943; 5:22 p.m.
- Location: Wayland, New York
- Coordinates: 42°33′10″N 77°35′36″W
- Country: United States
- Line: Delaware, Lackawanna and Western Railroad
- Incident type: Derailment
- Cause: Train on track without authority

Statistics
- Trains: 2
- Passengers: ~500
- Deaths: 29
- Injured: 114

The Lackawanna Limited wreck occurred when a Delaware, Lackawanna and Western Railroad (DL&W) passenger train, the New York-Buffalo Lackawanna Limited with 500 passengers, crashed into a freight train on August 30, 1943, killing 29 people in the small Steuben County community of Wayland in upstate New York, approximately 40 miles (64 km) south of Rochester.

== Accident ==
Passenger train consist
August 30, 1943
- Train: #3 Lakawanna Limited
- DLW 1151 (1151 class 4-6-4); DLW 1812 Baggage-mail car; Pullman Princess Margaret parlor-lounge car; Pullman Imola sleeping car; DLW 245 coach; DLW 238 coach; NKP 62 coach; DLW 241 coach; DLW 466 dining car; DLW 212 coach; DLW 252 coach; DLW 272 coach

On August 30, 1943, the Delaware, Lackawanna and Western Railroad's New York-to-Buffalo Lackawanna Limited train with 500 passengers aboard departed from Hoboken, New Jersey, on time at 9:20 a.m. It left Binghamton at 2:50 p.m. (30 minutes behind schedule), and traveled the 120 miles (190 km) to the crash site in approximately three hours. The train was pulled by a Hudson steam locomotive. The freight train with which it collided was traveling from Elmira to Mount Morris. It had backed into a siding to allow the passenger train, with its thirteen-passenger cars and two mail cars, to pass, but then moved back onto the main line while switching freight cars at a furniture factory. At 5:22 p.m., the passenger train sideswiped the engine of the freight train and derailed. The freight train locomotive scraped the sides of several cars before causing severe damage to the fifth passenger coach. The impact tore open the side of that car, and boiler steam from the damaged freight engine, now on its side, shot into the coach.

Many people were trapped in the coach and some were able to escape by breaking windows. Other passengers from the rear cars also broke windows to vent the steam and free trapped passengers. This car sustained the most severe damage and accounted for most of the fatalities. All but one of the fatalities were caused by internal or external scalding by the boiler steam. Another 114 people were injured, with at least 56 requiring hospitalization. The freight train had ignored a stop signal and moved onto the passenger train's track.

== Rescue ==
A deputy sheriff saw the crash from a nearby bridge and immediately radioed for medical services. Ambulances, doctors, and nurses from the nearby towns of Dansville and Hornell responded to the scene to treat the victims. The only hospital in Wayland was overwhelmed as it had only fifteen beds. Many wounded were taken to other towns by ambulance and private automobiles. Minor injuries were given first-aid treatment in clinics set up in a local American Legion building and Masonic Hall.

A practice wartime blackout covering all of New York State except the New York City area was ignored during the rescue and was eventually cancelled by the US Army who also ordered civil defense personnel to help in the rescue. Army soldiers, most of whom were passengers, initially formed a police unit to keep the hundreds of spectators from interfering with rescue operations until sufficient police were available. Twenty-three New York State Troopers as well as deputies from the Steuben, Ontario and Livingston County Sheriff's Office responded. About 65 members of the Red Cross provided aid as well as local Boy Scouts. An emergency shipment of blood plasma was flown from Strong Memorial Hospital in Rochester by the Civil Air Patrol to the Dansville Airport and landed with the aid of automobile headlights on the runway; additional blood was donated by people at the scene after an emergency blood service was set up.

== Aftermath ==
The wreck damaged about 1,000 feet (300 m) of track. Six of the cars remained upright and were used to transport the passengers back eastward to Elmira for treatment of minor injuries and to spend the night. A DL&W repair crew from Buffalo and another New York Central Railroad crew from Corning were dispatched to clear the wreck and reopen the main line to traffic. Train traffic was running on schedule on repaired track the next evening.

The DL&W sent a train from Hoboken, New Jersey, the next day with relatives of the victims to aid in identification of the dead, some of whom were scalded beyond recognition. Final identifications were not made for several days.

== Cause ==
The cause of the accident was investigated by the railroad, the New York State Public Service Commission, and the Interstate Commerce Commission. The engineer of the freight train said he was not expecting the passenger train so soon as it had been reported to be behind schedule. The engineer of the passenger train, who had been regaining time and was only ten minutes behind at the time of the crash, said he saw the freight engine on the track ahead and applied the emergency brakes but could not stop in time. The train was traveling about 80 miles per hour (130 km/h) (the track's speed limit) and had slowed to about 50 miles per hour (80 km/h) at the time of the collision.

Investigation confirmed that all signaling devices were operational and in the correct position. The location was not protected by a derail device, which "probably" would have prevented the accident according to a Public Service Commission investigator. Derail devices were usually used only when the siding was on a downgrade. The engineer of the freight train, 63-year-old Albert Driscoll, who had worked in that position for 37 years, testified the train was switching cars at the Gunlocke chair factory siding when he moved onto the main track after being signaled to do so by the brakeman. The brakeman said he assumed the train would stop before reaching the main line. There was other conflicting testimony over what signals were given, switch settings, the schedule of the passenger train, and whether the crew believed they could be on the main track for another ten minutes even though that was against formal rules.

The ICC concluded the cause of the accident was a failure of the railroad to "adhere to and enforce operating rules which are essential to safety". Control was by timetable, train orders, and an automatic block and cab signal system. The freight train was required to be off the main line by 5:03 p.m., yet it moved back on the main line twenty minutes later when all signals allowed the passenger train to proceed. There was a long-standing practice to not strictly follow formal rules. The ICC report concluded with "Similar accidents may be expected to occur as long as operating officials fail to conform to the practices prescribed by their rules."

== Other ==
The spouse of one victim was awarded $23,000 (equivalent to $428,000 in 2025) in the settlement of a negligence claim against the railroad, while the surviving minor children of a couple were awarded $51,000 (equivalent to $933,000 in 2025).

As a result of the accident, the Public Service Commission ordered the DL&W to install derailing devices as an added safety measure on most sidings connecting to the main lines of the Scranton, Buffalo, Syracuse, and Utica divisions.

NKP Coach #62 has survived and is being repaired by the Midwest Railway Preservation Society in Cleveland, Ohio in 2013.

== In the media ==
=== Television ===
NKP #62, known as the "Death Car" of the Lackawanna Limited wreck, was featured as a haunted location on the paranormal TV series Most Terrifying Places which aired on the Travel Channel in 2019.

== See also ==
- 1943 in the United States
- List of American railroad accidents
- List of rail accidents (1930–49)
