= New York Central 2933 =

Preserved American 4-8-2 locomotive

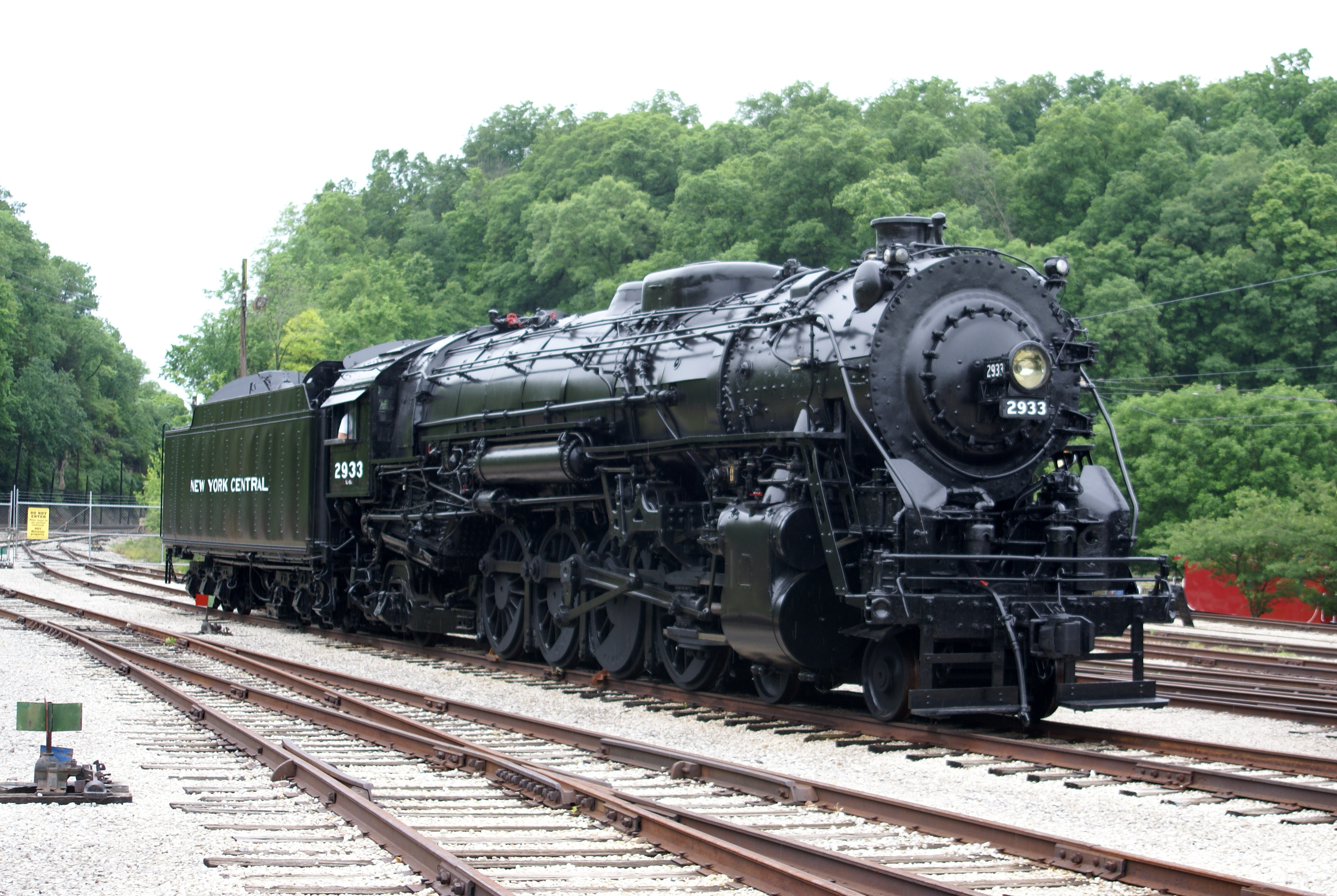
- NYC No. 2933 on static display at the Museum of Transportation, on May 20, 2017
Type and origin
- Power type: Steam
- Builder: American Locomotive Company
- Serial number: 68126
- Build date: October 1929
Specifications
- Configuration
  - Whyte: 4-8-2
  - UIC: 2′D1′ h2
- Gauge: 4 ft 8 1/2 in (1,435 mm)
- Driver dia.: 69 in (1,753 mm)
- Adhesive weight: 247,500 lb (112.3 t)
- Loco weight: 369,100 lb (167.4 t)
- Fuel type: Coal
- Fuel capacity: 28 short tons (25.4 t; 25.0 long tons)
- Water cap.: 15,000 US gal (57,000 L; 12,000 imp gal)
- Firebox
  - Grate area: 75.3 sq ft (7.00 m^{2})
- Boiler pressure: 225 lbf/in^{2} (1.55 MPa)
- Heating surface
  - Firebox: 373 sq ft (34.7 m^{2})
- Cylinders: Two, outside
- Cylinder size: 27 in × 30 in (686 mm × 762 mm)
- Valve gear: Baker
- Valve type: Piston valves
- Loco brake: Air
- Train brakes: Air
Performance figures
- Maximum speed: 60 mph (97 km/h)
- Power output: 3,330 hp (2,480 kW) at 39 miles per hour (63 km/h)
- Tractive effort: 60,618 lbf (269.64 kN)
- Factor of adh.: 4.08
Career
- Operators: Cleveland, Cincinnati, Chicago and St. Louis Railway; New York Central Railroad
- Class: L-2d
- Numbers: NYC 6233; NYC 2933
- Official name: Mohawk
- Retired: 1957
- Restored: May 2017 (cosmetically)
- Current owner: National Museum of Transportation
- Disposition: On static display

New York Central 2933 is a preserved L-2d class 4-8-2 Mohawk "Mountain" type steam locomotive, built in October 1929 by the American Locomotive Company (ALCO) for the New York Central Railroad (NYC). The wheel arrangement is known as the Mountain type on other railroads, but the New York Central dubbed them "Mohawks" after the Mohawk River, which the railroad followed. It pulled freight trains until being retired in 1957. As of 2026, the locomotive is on display at the National Museum of Transportation in Kirkwood, Missouri.

== History ==
=== Construction and revenue service ===
No. 2933—originally numbered 6233—was one of twenty-four L-2d class 4-8-2s (Nos. 6225-6249) built in November 1929, by the American Locomotive Company (ALCO) for the New York Central Railroad’s subsidiary, the Cleveland, Cincinnati, Chicago and St. Louis Railway (CCC&StL), also known as the Big Four Railroad. Within the next four months, ALCO built fifty more L-2ds (Nos. 2450-2499) for the NYC’s main roster.

The only difference between the L-2ds on the Big Four and the NYC is that the Big Four locomotives lacked water scoops in their tenders, since the Big Four did not have any track pans. The L-2ds, which were among 600 NYC "Mohawk"-type locomotives, were primarily used to haul mainline freight trains. In 1936, all of the Big Four’s L-2ds were transferred to the NYC and renumbered in the 2900 series, and in the process, No. 6233 was renumbered to No. 2933.

No. 2933 made its final run for the NYC sometime after July 1956, and it was officially retired from the railroad’s active roster in August 1957, three months after the NYC completed their dieselization process.

=== Retirement and preservation ===
Following the NYC’s dieselization, incoming president Alfred E. Perlman ordered for as many of the railroad’s steam locomotives to be scrapped as possible, including most of the Mohawks. No. 2933 avoided the scrapping, since it was used as a stationary steam boiler in the NYC shops before it was left in storage on a siding.

In 1962, the chairman of the National Museum of Transportation (TNMOT) in St. Louis, Missouri, approached former Wabash chairman Arthur Atkinson, and enquired for another steam locomotive to exhibit. Atkinson in turn directly approached Pearlman and asked for New York Central and Hudson River 999 to be donated to the MoT. Perlman declined, since No. 999 was already reserved for the Museum of Science and Industry in Chicago, but he instead offered to donate No. 2933, to which Atkinson accepted. This makes the 2933 the only large New York Central steam locomotive to be donated directly by the railroad.

On June 13, 1963, No. 2933, along with ALCO S-2 No. 113, were formally donated to the MoT at a ceremony held at the St. Louis Union Station. Atkinson and Perlman were both in attendance. Following the ceremony, No. 2933 was left in temporary storage on the Alton and Southern Railway (ALS), while the MoT searched for a larger location to display their collection. In July 1969, No. 2933 was towed with other locomotives to the MoT’s new site in Kirkwood, Missouri, where it was then put on static display. (Note: During the 1980s, the St. Louis Steam Train Association (SLSTA) restored St. Louis—San Francisco No. 1522 to operating condition, but beforehand, they inspected most of the MoT’s other steam locomotives for eligibility. They decided against restoring No. 2933, due to its poor condition.)

In 2007, the MoT initiated a thorough cosmetic restoration to be performed on No. 2933. A contractor was hired to remove insulation from the boiler, and then museum volunteers worked to repaint the whole locomotive and to replace its boiler jacketing. The cosmetic restoration was completed, in May 2017.

== See also ==
- New York Central 3001
- Norfolk and Western 2156
- Southern Pacific 4460
- St. Louis–San Francisco 1522

== Bibliography ==
- Steam in the East. Niagaras & Mohawks, New York Central's 4-8-4 Steam Locomotives (DVD). Sunday River Productions.
- Durham, Robert K. (2000). New York Central: Steam-Locomotives and Trains from 1933 to 1943. R.K. Durham. ISBN 978-0-9644-4800-1.
