= William Buchanan (locomotive designer) =

American locomotive designer (1830–1910)

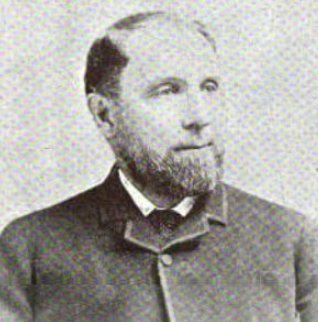
- Buchanan c. 1893
- Born: March 6, 1830; Dumbarton, Scotland
- Died: January 20, 1910 (aged 79); South Norwalk, Connecticut, U.S.
- Occupation: Mechanical engineer
- Known for: Designing locomotives for New York Central Railroad

William Buchanan (March 6, 1830 – January 20, 1910) was an American mechanical engineer. He spent most of his career designing high-speed steam locomotives for the New York Central Railroad including the New York Central and Hudson River Railroad No. 999 locomotive, designed to travel over 100 miles per hour (160 km/h). He also designed and improved freight locomotives for hauling heavy commercial freight. He was an authority on mechanical engineering in America and Europe and was elected to membership of the Institute of Civil Engineers of London.

== Early life ==
William Buchanan was born in Dumbarton, Scotland, on March 6, 1830. His father was a mechanic and blacksmith; Buchanan immigrated to the U.S. when he was young, and learned blacksmithing and machining at the Burden Iron Works at Troy, New York. In 1847, he became employed at the Albany and Schenectady Railroad as an apprentice in the machine shops of the company at Albany, New York. Early in his career he did mechanical work on the DeWitt Clinton locomotive.

Buchanan worked as a machinist in the machine shops of the Hudson River Railroad until July 1851 as a locomotive engineer on the New York City line. He became shop foreman and in June 1853 master mechanic of the Southern Division of the Hudson River Railroad.

== Mid life and career ==
Buchanan was given responsibility for the locomotive power of the Hudson River Railroad and the Troy and Greenfield Railroad in 1859 with the New York and Harlem Railroad added to his responsibilities in 1880. In 1881 Buchanan was placed in charge of the locomotive power of the New York Central and Hudson River Railroad before being promoted in 1885 to the superintendent position of locomotive power and vehicle rolling stock. The West Shore Railroad was leased to New York Central Railroad in 1886 and at that time Buchanan was given the responsibilities of managing the locomotive engines and passenger cars in addition to his existing duties.

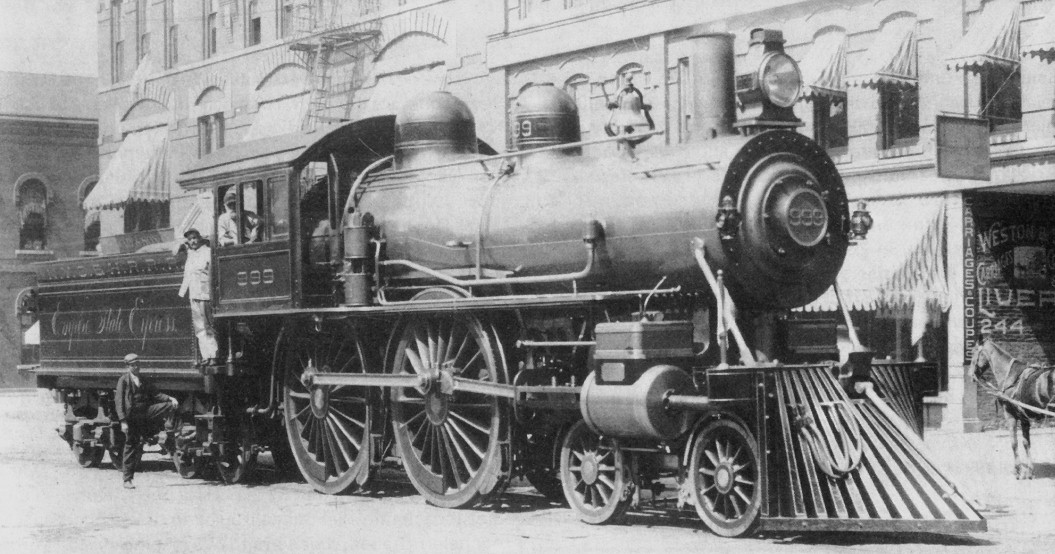
No. 999 locomotive in 1893

Buchanan made many improvements in locomotives from the West Albany machine shops and in recognition of his work was elected a member of the Institution of Civil Engineers of London in 1891.

Buchanan designed and named the New York Central and Hudson River Railroad locomotive No. 999 engine in 1893. The locomotive pulled the New York state express train of vehicles on a test run from Rochester, New York, to Buffalo, New York on May 9, 1893.

As well as his work on the 999 locomotive, Buchanan redesigned and improved existing locomotives for heavy duty freight with many of his designs for enormous train locomotives adopted by other railroad companies.

== Later life and death ==
Buchanan retired from the railroad business in 1899 after working for the New York Central since 1847. He died at South Norwalk, Connecticut, on January 20, 1910.

== Sources ==
- "William Buchanan". Locomotive Engineering. 6 (1). Angus Sinclair: 290. 1893.
- "William Buchanan". Railroad Men. 12 (8). YMCA New York, Railroad Branch: 302. 1898.
- "Obituary - William Buchanan". Minutes of Proceedings of the Institution of Civil Engineers. 183 (1). Institution of Civil Engineers (Great Britain): 331. 1911.
- "Engine 999 repeating history". Chicago Tribune. Chicago, Illinois. July 29, 1994. p. 116 – via Newspapers.com.
- "Obituary". Railway Age Gazette. 48 (1). Simmons-Boardman Publishing Company: 208. 1910.
- Eula, Michael J. (2022). "Empire State Express No. 999". 999. Genesee County History Department.
