= New York Central and Hudson River Railroad No. 999 =

1893 steam locomotive

NYC #999
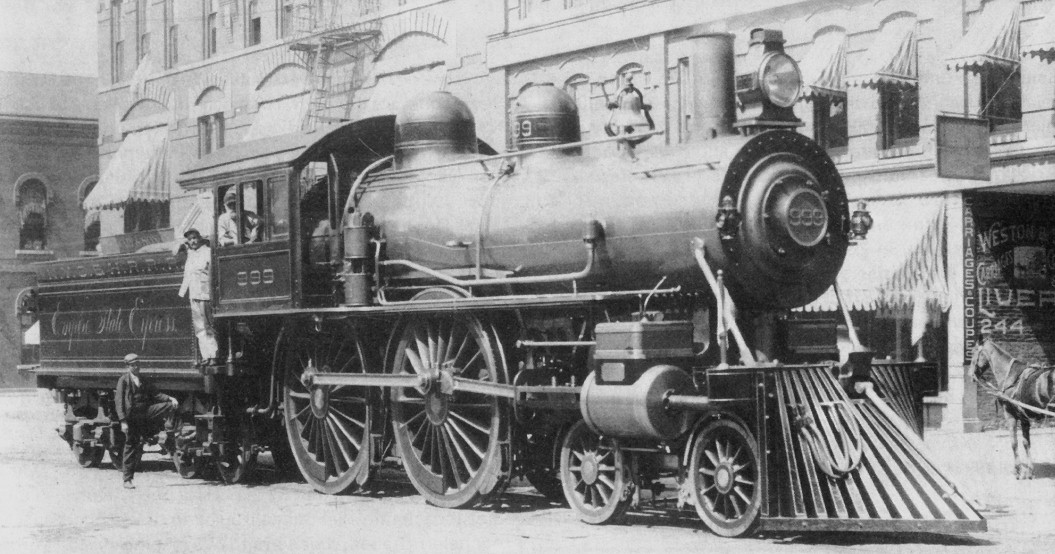
- Engine 999 in Syracuse
Type and origin
- Power type: Steam
- Builder: NYC West Albany Shops
- Build date: 1893
Specifications
- Configuration
  - Whyte: 4-4-0
- Gauge: 4 ft 8 1/2 in (1,435 mm)
- Driver dia.: 86.5 in (2,197 mm) later: 70 in (1,778 mm)
- Adhesive weight: 84,000 lb (38.1 tonnes)
- Loco weight: 124,000 lb (56.2 tonnes)
- Fuel type: Coal
- Boiler pressure: 180 lbf/in^{2} (1,241 kPa)
- Cylinders: Two, outside
- Cylinder size: 15 in (381 mm)
Career
- Operators: New York Central and Hudson River Railroad
- Numbers: NYC 999; NYC 1086; NYC 1021
- First run: May 1893
- Retired: 1952
- Current owner: Chicago Museum of Science and Industry
- Disposition: On static display

New York Central and Hudson River Railroad 999 is a 4-4-0 "American" type steam locomotive built for the New York Central and Hudson River Railroad in 1893, which was intended to haul the road's Empire State Express train service. It was built for high speed and is alleged to be the first steam locomotive in the world to travel over 100 miles per hour (160 km/h), with at least one (questionable) source claiming it reached a maximum speed of 112.5 miles per hour (181.1 km/h).

== Development ==
In 1892, New York Central's General Passenger Agent, George Henry Daniels, proposed a new, fast locomotive be designed to publicize the Empire State Express at the upcoming World's Columbian Exposition in Chicago in 1893. New York Central's Chief Superintendent of Motive Power & Rolling Stock, William Buchanan, had designed a class of 4-4-0 locomotives known as the Class "I", which were already capable of reaching high speeds, so it was simply a matter of making some modifications to an existing design. In 1893, locomotive #999 was rolled out of the New York Central's West Albany Shops.

The 999 was mounted on 86.5 in (2.20 m) drivers, larger than the 70 in (1.8 m) drivers its classmates utilized, while also having its brakes mounted on the pilot truck, which was a new approach. The bands, pipes, and trim were highly polished; the boiler, smokestack, domes, cab, and tender were given a satin finish of black, and "Empire State Express" was applied to the sides of the tender in 2 ft 6 in (762 mm) high gold leaf lettering.

== World's fair and later service ==
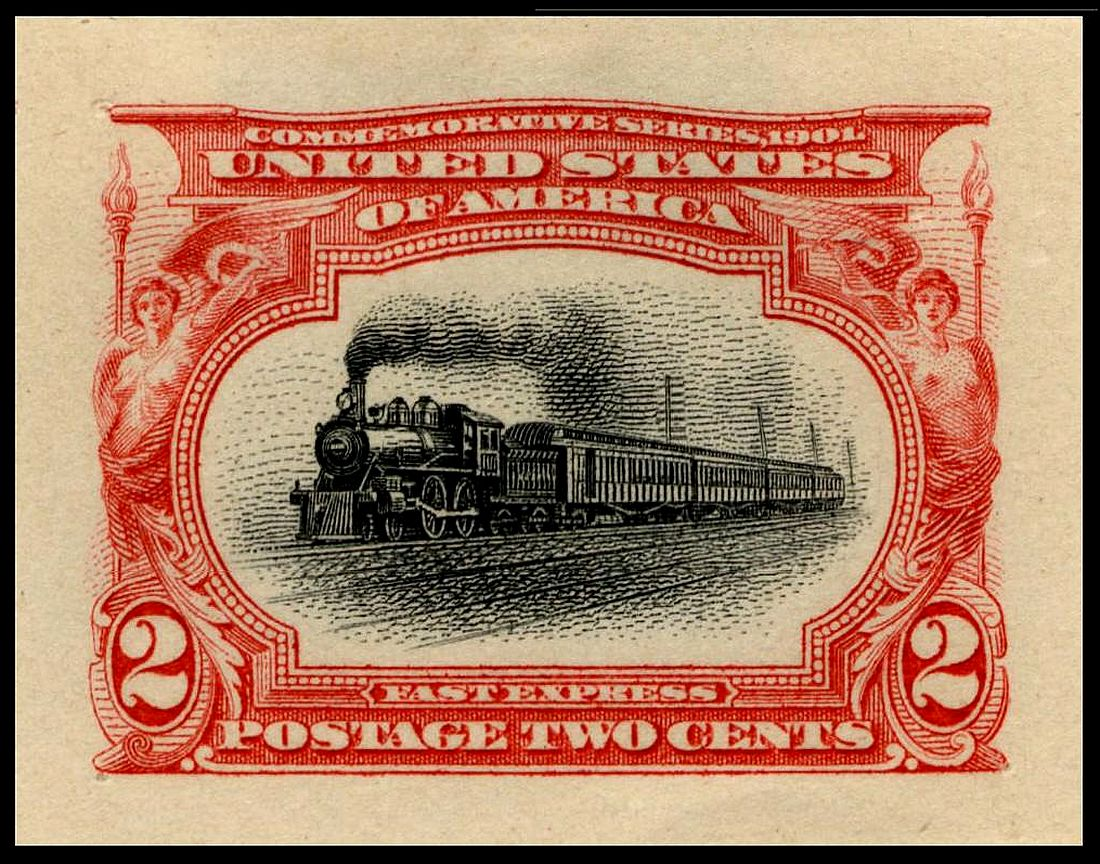
1901 U.S. stamp

After the 1893 Chicago World's Fair, the engine continued to pull the Empire State Express between Buffalo and Syracuse until 1899. When the engine was sent to other parts of the railroad system, it was found to be hard to handle when pulling more than five cars, as it slipped. It was rebuilt with the same 70 inch drivers as the other engines of the class. In the 1920s, it was given a new boiler and tender, operating local and branch line trains until 1924, when it was put on a scrap line, having long lost its original number. A higher-up in the company was notified of the situation, and 999 was restored for exhibition at the Baltimore and Ohio Railroad's "Fair of the Iron Horse" the following year.

== Retirement ==
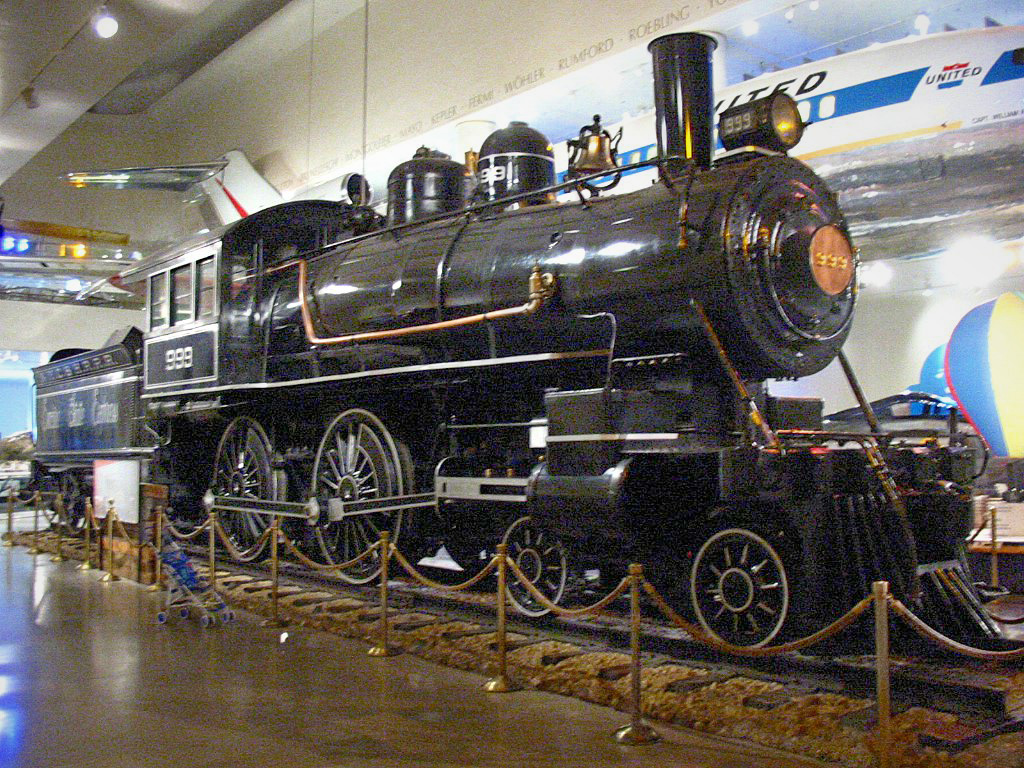
No. 999 on display at the Museum of Science and Industry, Chicago

After touring the nation and making appearances at numerous expositions, including the 1948-49 Chicago Railroad Fair, the unit was retired from service in May 1952, following its demotion to yard switching service in western New York, shuttling express service refrigerator railroad cars. At this time, the railroad appeared to turn its back on steam power, resulting in the vast majority of its steam locomotives, including all of its famed Hudsons and Niagaras and all but two Mohawks, being scrapped by 1957. However, the railroad decided to preserve the 999. The New York Central donated the locomotive to the Chicago Museum of Science and Industry in 1962.

Once the unit had arrived at the Museum of Science and Industry, the engine was displayed outside, where it began to decay after being exposed to the elements. In 1993, the museum conducted a major restoration of the 999. This project included a cosmetic restoration of number 999, and it was placed inside the museum's main hall. The locomotive is displayed with its later 70-inch drivers, rather than its original 86-inch ones.

== Sources ==
- Holbrook, Stewart H. (1947). The Story of American Railroads. New York: Crown Publishers.
- Lienhard, John H. (2008). How Invention Begins. Oxford University Press. ISBN 9780195341201.
- Moses, Laura-Eve (2005). The Encyclopedia of New York State. Syracuse University Press. ISBN 9780815608080.
- Eula, Michael J. (2022). "Empire State Express No. 999". 999. Genesee County History Department.
- "Famous High-Speed Locomotive '999' to be Preserved by New York Central". New Castle Herald. New Castle, Pennsylvania. January 15, 1923. p. 7 – via Newspapers.com.
- "Famous High Speed Locomotive '999' will be Preserved". Rutland Daily Herald. Rutland, Vermont. January 22, 1923. p. 11 – via Newspapers.com.
- "New Home for Old 999". Chicago Tribune. Chicago, Illinois. September 16, 1962. p. 20.
