= New York Central Hudson =

American 4-6-4 steam locomotives (1927–1957)

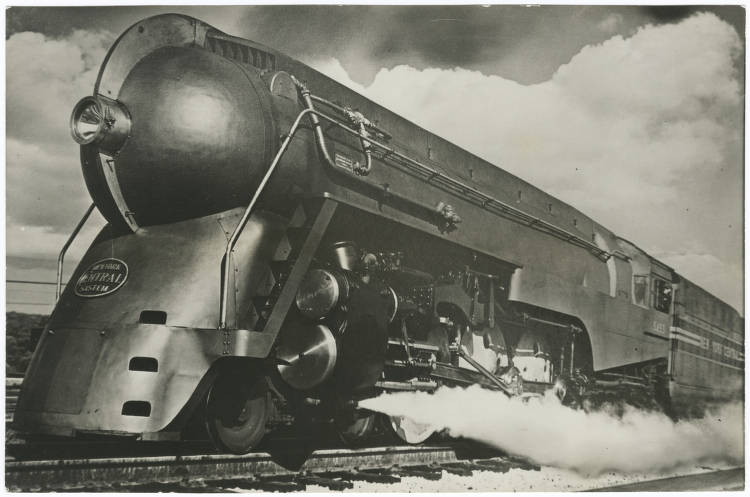
- A promotional image of New York Central streamlined Dreyfuss Hudson No. 5453 in the late 1930s
Type and origin
- Power type: Steam
- Designer: Paul W. Kiefer
- Builder: Alco-Schenectady (ALCO) (265); Lima Locomotive Works (10)
- Build date: 1927–1931 (J-1); 1928–1931 (J-2); 1937–1938 (J-3)
- Total produced: 275
Specifications
- Configuration
  - Whyte: 4-6-4
  - UIC: 2’C2’h2S
- Gauge: 4 ft 8 1/2 in (1,435 mm) standard gauge
- Leading dia.: 36 in (914 mm)
- Driver dia.: 79 in (2,007 mm)
- Trailing dia.: 36 in (914 mm) (front); 51 in (1,295 mm) (rear)
- Wheelbase: 83 ft 7 1/2 in (25.489 m)
- Length: 97 ft 2 3/8 in (29.626 m)
- Width: 10 ft 6 in (3.20 m)
- Height: 15 ft 1 in (4.60 m)
- Axle load: 67,267 lb (30,511.8 kg; 30.5 t)
- Adhesive weight: 201,800 lb (91,534.9 kg; 91.5 t)
- Loco weight: 365,500 lb (165,788.0 kg; 165.8 t)
- Tender weight: 316,400 lb (143,500 kg; 143.5 t)
- Total weight: 681,900 lb (309,300 kg; 309.3 t)
- Tender type: 8-wheel; 12-wheel; 14-wheel
- Fuel type: Coal
- Fuel capacity: 56,000 lb (25,400 kg; 25.40 t)
- Water cap.: 13,600 US gal (51,000 L; 11,300 imp gal)
- Firebox
  - Grate area: 82 sq ft (7.6 m^{2})
- Boiler: 91.5 in (2,324 mm)
- Boiler pressure: 265 lbf/in^{2} (1.83 MPa)
- Feedwater heater: Elesco bundle; Worthington SA; Coffin
- Heating surface
  - Firebox: 360 sq ft (33.4 m^{2})
  - Tubes: 657 sq ft (61.0 m^{2})
  - Flues: 3,170 sq ft (295 m^{2})
  - Tubes and flues: 3,827 sq ft (355.5 m^{2})
  - Total surface: 5,572 sq ft (517.7 m^{2})
- Superheater
  - Heating area: 1,745 sq ft (162.1 m^{2})
- Cylinders: Two, outside
- Cylinder size: 22.5 in × 29 in (572 mm × 737 mm)
- Valve gear: Baker
- Valve type: Piston valves
Performance figures
- Maximum speed: 123.6 mph (198.9 km/h)
- Tractive effort: 41,860 lbf (186.20 kN)
- Factor of adh.: 4.82
Career
- Operators: New York Central Railroad, Boston and Albany Railroad, Toronto, Hamilton and Buffalo Railway, Michigan Central Railroad, Cleveland, Cincinnati, Chicago and St. Louis Railway
- Class: J-1, J-2 and J-3
- Number in class: 205 (J-1), 20 (J-2), 50 (J-3)
- Retired: 1940 (1) 1953-1957
- Disposition: All scrapped by the late 1950s (steam heat car converted from the tender of J-1d 5313 preserved at Steamtown National Historic Site)

The New York Central Hudson was a popular 4-6-4 "Hudson" type steam locomotive built for the New York Central Railroad (NYC). 275 of them were built in three different classes between 1927 and 1938 by the American Locomotive Company (ALCO) and the Lima Locomotive Works (LLW). Named after the Hudson River, the 4-6-4 wheel arrangement came to be known as the "Hudson" type in the United States, as these locomotives were the first examples built and used in North America. Built for high-speed passenger train work, the Hudson locomotives were famously known for hauling the New York Central's crack passenger trains, such as the 20th Century Limited and the Empire State Express.

With the onset of diesel locomotives by the mid-20th Century, all Hudson locomotives were retired and subsequently scrapped by 1957, except for the tender from J-1d 5313, which is preserved at the Steamtown National Historic Site in Scranton, Pennsylvania.

== History ==
=== Background ===
During the 1900s to early 1920s, New York Central Railroad's (NYC) roster consisted of K class 4-6-2 Pacifics, which were the primary passenger locomotives of the railroad's Big Four, Boston and Albany (B&A), and Michigan Central (MC) regions at the time. But by the mid-1920s, the Pacifics have reached their limits and were not able to keep up with the demands of longer, heavier trains and higher speeds due to the railroad's booming passenger traffic. Given NYC's axle load limits, the Pacifics could not be made any larger; a new locomotive type would be required to carry the larger boilers. The Lima Locomotive Works' (LLW) conception of superpower steam as realized in the 2-8-4 Berkshire type inspired NYC chief mechanical engineer Paul W. Kiefer to design a new six-coupled type locomotive with a significantly large firebox supported by a 4-wheel trailing truck. The resulting greater steaming rate ensured that such a locomotive would never run out of power at speed, a common failing of older locomotives. Applying the ideas of the freight-minded Berkshire type to the Pacific resulted in a 4-6-4 locomotive. NYC President Patrick E. Crowley named the units Hudsons after the Hudson River, which divides the New York State's Hudson Valley and streams broadly past New York City.

=== Design and construction ===
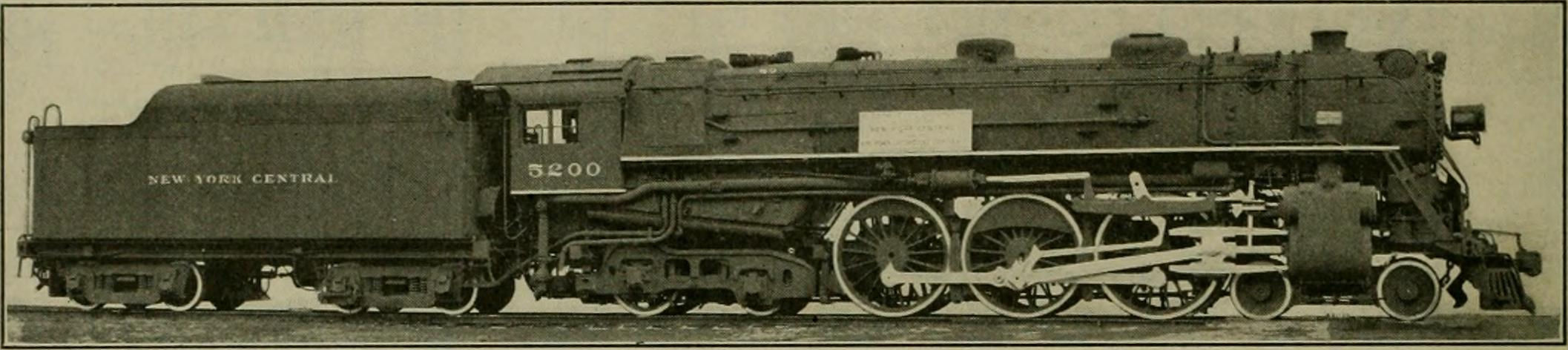
Builder's photograph of J-1a class Hudson No. 5200

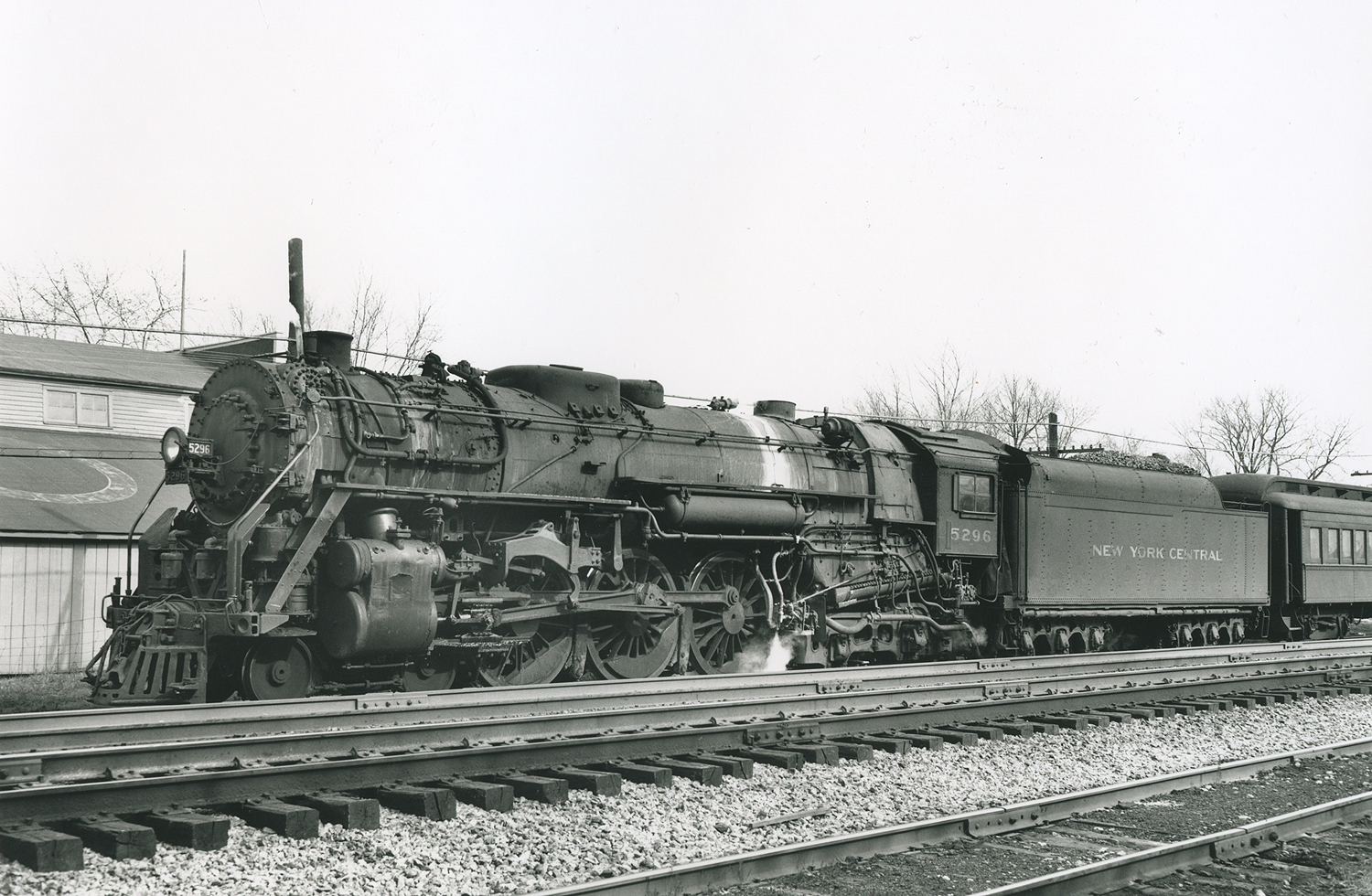
J-1 class No. 5296 in Chesterton, Indiana

NYC ordered prototype No. 5200 from Alco and subjected it to intensive testing around 1927. A fleet of 205 J-1 class Hudsons were eventually built, including 30 each for the Michigan Central Railroad (MC road numbers 8200-8229) and the Cleveland, Cincinnati, Chicago & St. Louis Railway ("Big Four" - road numbers 6600-6629). In addition, NYC subsidiary Boston & Albany Railroad ordered 20 J-2 class (B&A road numbers 600-619), the latter 10 from Lima Locomotive Works (all other NYC Hudsons were built by Alco's Schenectady works). A later development were 50 J-3a class Super Hudsons in 1937–1938, with many modern appliances and innovations. After the MC, Big 4, and B&A locomotives were incorporated into the NYC numbering, the NYC Hudson locomotives had road numbers ranging from 5200 to 5474. The NYC J-1 road numbers were 5200-5344, the MC J-1s became NYC 5345-5374, the Big 4 J-1s became NYC 5375-5404, the J-2s (all from B&A) became NYC road numbers 5455-5474, and the J-3 road numbers were 5405-5454. The J-2 numbers are last because they were transferred to the NYC after the J-3 deliveries.

=== Streamlining ===
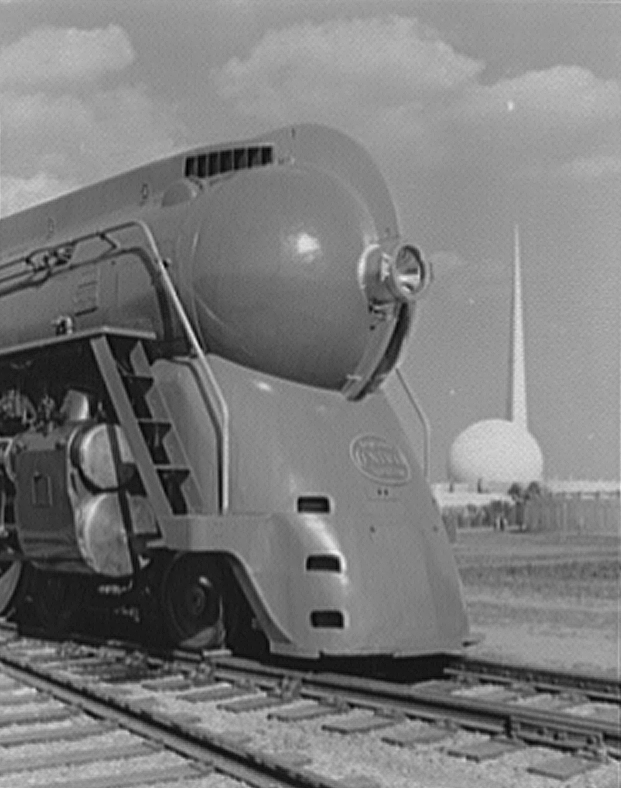
Streamlined J-3a Hudson at the 1939 New York World's Fair

The Hudsons were of excellent quality. In response to the styling sensation of the new diesel-powered Zephyr streamliner, Locomotive No. 5344 (the last J-1e) was fitted with an Art Deco streamlined shroud designed by Carl F. Kantola and was named Commodore Vanderbilt on December 27, 1934. The streamlining was later replaced to match the last ten J-3a Super Hudson locomotives (5445-5454) that had been built with streamlining designed by Henry Dreyfuss. J-1e Hudson #5344 stuck out from the rest of the roster, as it was the only J-1 to be streamlined, and was one of two locomotives ever to be streamlined twice (the other being a Baltimore and Ohio P-7, number 5304). Two more J-3a locomotives (5426 & 5429) had a 3rd streamlining style fitted in 1941 for Empire State Express service. The streamlined locomotives featured prominently in NYC advertising.

The forte of all Hudsons was power at top speed. They were poor performers at low speed and the presence of a booster engine on the trailing truck was an absolute necessity for starting. For this reason, they were generally favored by railroads with flat terrain and straight routes. After the NYC, the Milwaukee Road was also fond of the Hudsons, acquiring 22 class F6 and six streamlined class F7s. The Atchison, Topeka & Santa Fe Railway also had 16, while the New York, New Haven & Hartford Railroad had 10 (#1400-1409) streamlined I-5 4-6-4s built by Baldwin in 1937, nicknamed "Shoreliners."

A booster was prone to troubles, however, and gradually fell out of favor. Instead of a complicated booster, it was deemed preferential to have an extra pair of driving wheels, and thus better traction.

== Accidents and incidents ==
- On April 19, 1940, J-1e No. 5315 was leading a 23-minute late westbound Lake Shore Limited when it derailed on a curve near Little Falls, New York due to excessive speed by the engineer, killing 31 people and injuring 51 others, with the engineer and fireman among the dead. The accident was blamed on the engineer who was reportedly trying to make up lost time. No. 5315 was severely damaged from the wreck and scrapped, being NYC's first Hudson to be retired from the roster.
- On September 7, 1943, J-3a No. 5450 suffered a boiler explosion in Canastota, New York, while leading the 20th Century Limited, killing the three head end crew and putting it out of service until September 1944, due to a steel shortage.

== Later service ==
Trials of later, dual-purpose 4-8-2 Mohawks sealed the Hudson's fate. The L-3 and L-4 Mohawks were excellent, but they were still more suited to lower-speed hauling than high-speed power. In 1944, NYC received permission from the War Production Board to build a new, high-speed locomotive of the 4-8-4 type, combining all the advantages of the Hudson with those of the Mohawk. Many other railroads had taken to the 4-8-4 in the 1930s, generally calling them Northerns after the Northern Pacific Railway, which had first adopted them. By being a late adopter, the NYC had the chance to build on everyone else's experience. That locomotive proved to be exceptional, and the type on the NYC was named the Niagara. Since only 27 were built, however, they only took over the heaviest and most-prestigious trains, and the last Niagara (No. 6015) was retired in July, 1956. Many Hudsons soldiered-on until the end of steam on NYC in 1957.

== Withdrawal and scrapping ==
When the railroad dieselized, all of the Hudsons were scrapped; none were preserved. This was caused by the direct order of then-NYC president Alfred E. Perlman, albeit not completely due to opposing preservation. The financial situation of the New York Central was critical when Perlman became the chairman, and the scrap value of all the steam locomotives was enough to bring the railroad back from the brink. His decision to scrap the entirety of the NYC's steam fleet (and later those of the Denver & Rio Grande Western's standard gauge) has earned him a reputation as anti-steam locomotive preservationist.

Two J-1d class Hudsons, numbers 5311 and 5313, were sold to the Toronto, Hamilton and Buffalo Railway in 1948 and were renumbered 501 and 502 respectively. Both locomotives were retired and scrapped in 1954 when the TH&B dieselized. The tender from the 502 (formerly the 5313) was retained by the TH&B and converted to a steam generator car for use on passenger trains. The generator car still survives today and is part of the Steamtown National Historic Site collection.

== In popular culture ==
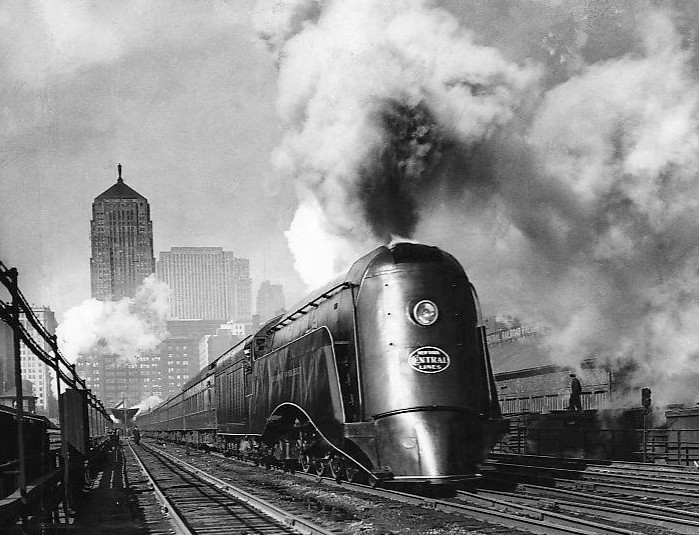
#5344 Commodore Vanderbilt (the last J-1e) featured Art Deco streamlining designed by Carl F. Kantola when introduced in 1934 (here in 1935, Chicago Board of Trade Building in background). By no later than 1939, it had been re-shrouded with the Art Deco streamlining designed by Henry Dreyfuss for the J-3 Super Hudsons.

- The character Connor from the Thomas & Friends television series is stylized after a streamlined NYC Hudson.
- NYC Hudsons are featured on the covers of Van Halen's 2012 album A Different Kind of Truth, the Commodores 1975 album Movin' On, Three Dog Night's 1975 album Coming Down Your Way, and the 2020 Dennis DeYoung album ‘’26 East : Volume 1’’.
- In Pocket Trains, there is a steam locomotive called the Century Limited. It resembles a streamlined Dreyfuss J-3 4-6-4 locomotive but is a 2-6-4 locomotive in the game due to sizing constraints. It is also the only steam locomotive in the game with side rods.
- In the Courage the Cowardly Dog episode "The Mask", a steam locomotive loosely based on a streamlined NYC J-3a Hudson was seen pulling an Amtrak passenger train which destroyed Mad Dog's car near the end of the episode.
- In the movie The Iron Giant, a steam locomotive resembling a NYC J-3a Hudson was pulling a coal train that crashed into the Giant while he was trying to fix the train tracks he attempted to eat at the railroad crossing.
- In season 5 episode 6 of The Big Bang Theory, "The Rhinitis Revelation", a "New Empire State Express" poster can be briefly seen on the back of Sheldon Cooper's door at the very end of the episode when Leonard interrupts Mary Cooper singing Soft Kitty.
- In The Grand Tour, the J-3 Hudson can be seen in the opening part of the show. Its valve gear is incorrectly animated.
- In How I Met Your Mother a poster of the New York Central Hudson can be seen in Ted Mosby's apartment, above the fireplace.
- The icon for the app Transport Tycoon, a version of Chris Sawyer's Locomotion for mobile devices, depicts a locomotive that closely resembles the New York Central Hudson.
- In Transformers: Revenge of the Fallen, a J-3a Dreyfuss appears in a vintage photo that was kept by Seymour Simmons in which the Hudson is confirmed as a Seeker by Autobot Wheelie.
- In the Rugrats episode "Murmur on the Ornery Express", there is a steam locomotive called "Biendeltown Express", which resembles a NYC streamlined NYC J-3a Hudson.
- In the movie Everyone's Hero, there is a steam locomotive that resembles a NYC J-1e Hudson. A streamlined J-3a Dreyfuss Super Hudson can be seen on a poster in a train station.
- The exact same above photo of the Streamlined Hudson at the 1939 New York World's Fair appears, framed, on the wall of Sam Lowry's apartment in Terry Gilliam's Brazil (1985 film) in the scene where Archibald Tuttle (played by Robert De Niro) is fixing Sam Lowry's faulty air conditioning system. Sam Lowry is played by Jonathan Pryce.
- In the SpongeBob SquarePants episode "The Great Patty Caper'', there is a steam locomotive called the "Oceanic Express", which loosely resembles a NYC J-1a Hudson.
- In the short film Lorenzo, there is a silhouette that resembles a NYC J-1e Hudson.
- The Hudsons have been featured in train games like Trainz and Train Simulator Classic (third-party only for the latter).
- The Red Ball Raceway logo in NASCAR 2005: Chase For The Cup and NASCAR 07 feature a NYC Hudson.
- Several models have been made of the NYC Hudsons, starting with a scale model by the Lionel Corporation. This has been reissued a few times, the most recent by Lionel, LLC.

== See also ==
- Delaware, Lackawanna and Western 1151 class

== Bibliography ==
- Drury, George H. (1993). Guide to North American Steam Locomotives. Waukesha, Wisconsin: Kalmbach Publishing Company. ISBN 0-89024-206-2.
- Solomon, Brian; Schafer, Mike (1999). New York Central Railroad. Railroad Color History (1st ed.). MBI Publishing Company. ISBN 0-7603-0613-3.
- Staufer, Alvin F. (1961). Steam Power of the New York Central System Volume 1: Modern Power - 1915-1955 (1st ed.). Standard Print & Publishing.
- Staufer, Alvin F.; May, Edward L. (1974). Thoroughbreds: New York Central's 4-6-4 Hudson, the most Famous Class of Steam Locomotive in the World. Medina, Ohio: A. F. Staufer. ISBN 978-0944513033.
- Westing, Frederick (November 1957). "The Hudson". Trains. Vol. 18, no. 1. Kalmbach Publishing. pp. 44–59.
