= New York Central Mohawk =

Class of NYC 4-8-2 locomotives

NYC Mohawk
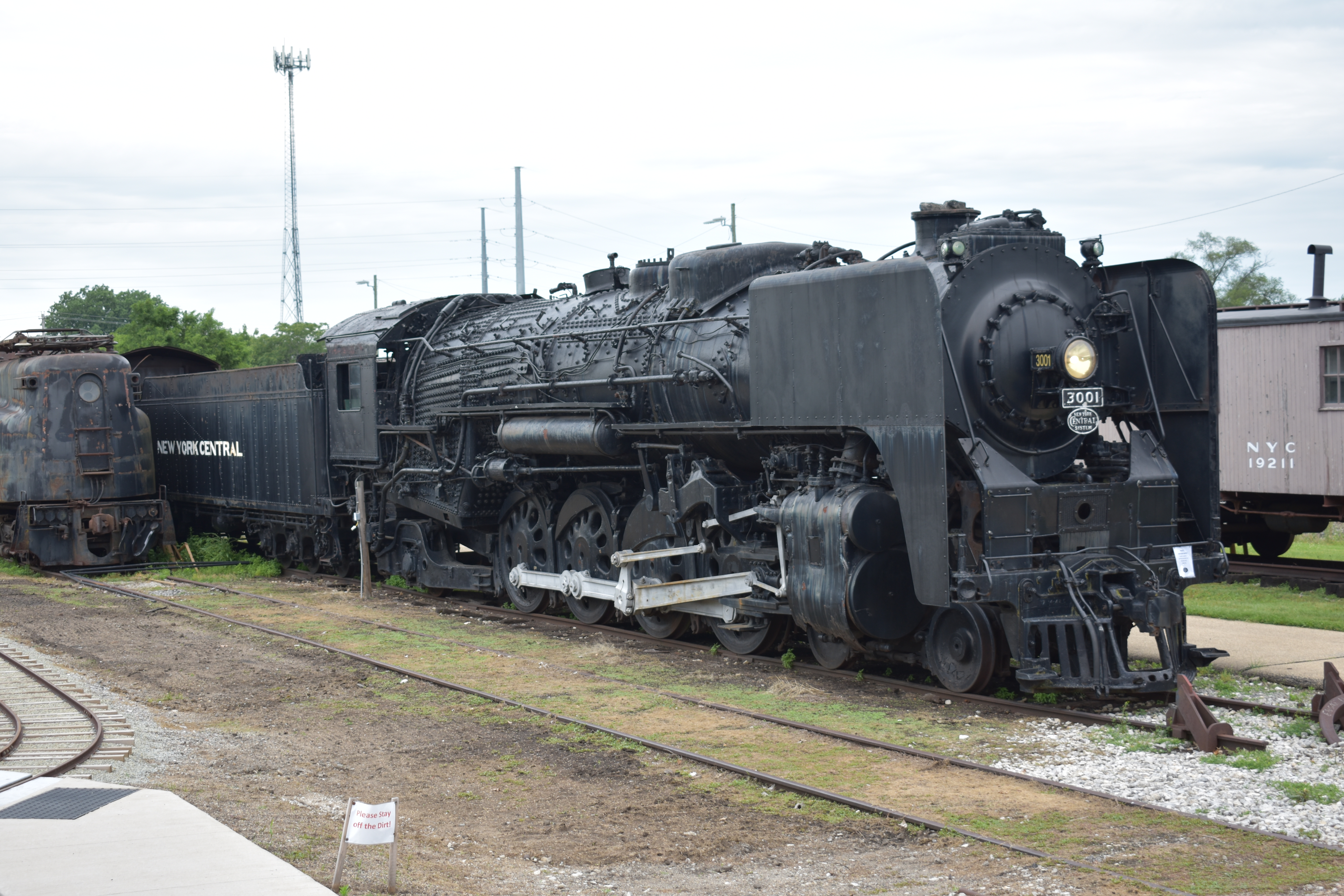
- New York Central 3001
Type and origin
- Power type: Steam
- Builder: American Locomotive Company
- Build date: L-1: 1916; L-2: 1925; L-3: 1940; L-4: 1942
- Total produced: 600
Specifications
- Configuration
  - Whyte: 4-8-2
- Gauge: 1435 mm
- Driver dia.: L-1/2/3: 69 in (1,752.60 mm); L-4: 72 in (1,828.80 mm)
- Wheelbase: 18 ft (5.5 m) (L-3/4: 19 ft (5.8 m))
- Total weight: around 646,200 lb (323.1 short tons; 293.1 t)
- Boiler: L-2 : -82⁷/₁₆ inch -85⅛ inch (Smokebox) -94 inch (O.D)
- Boiler pressure: L-1: 190 psi (1.31 MPa) - 200 psi (1.38 MPa); L-2: 225 psi (1.55 MPa); L-3/4: 250 psi (1.72 MPa)
- Feedwater heater: Elesco = L1c; L2a; L3b
- Valve gear: Baker
Performance figures
- Maximum speed: L-1/2: 60 mph (97 km/h); L-3/4: 80 mph (129 km/h)
- Power output: L-2d: 3,300 hp (2,500 kW); L-3a: 4,120 hp (3,070 kW); L-4a: 4,290 hp (3,200 kW)
- Tractive effort: L-1: 51,380 lbf (228.55 kN); L-1b 3-cylinder: 64,674 lbf (287.68 kN); L2 = 60,618 lbf (269.64 kN); L3/high speed L2d: 60,077 lbf (267.24 kN); L4: 59,854 lbf (266.24 kN)
Career
- Operators: New York Central
- Numbers: NYC 2500-3064,3100-3149 (with gaps)
- Retired: 1936-1957
- Preserved: Two (2933 and 3001) on static display
- Disposition: Two preserved, remainder scrapped

The New York Central Railroad (NYC) called the 4-8-2 type of steam locomotive the Mohawk type. It was known as the Mountain type on other roads, but the New York Central did not see the name as fitting on its famous Water Level Route. Instead, it picked the name of one of those rivers its rails followed, the Mohawk River, to name its newest type of locomotive.

The L1s and L2s were unstable at higher speeds due to the lack of effective cross-balancing, making the 4-wheel leading truck simply a better distributor of their weight; the L1s and L2s were consequently limited to 60 mph (97 km/h), though this issue was resolved for the L3s and L4s using data gathered from two experimental L-2s.

The New York Central became the largest 4-8-2 user in North America, with 600 locomotives of this type built for its service; only the Pennsylvania Railroad came close, with 301 M1's of the type.

The Mohawk type was the pre-eminent freight power of the network, displacing the 2-8-2 type from first-line service. While other roads obtained much more massive freight power, such as 2-10-0s and 2-10-4 types and a multitude of articulated designs, the New York Central, with its practically-gradeless high-speed riverside lines, needed speed over pulling power.

The 600 Mohawks delivered were divided into four main classes, plus a few experimental and prototypes that were rebuilt between 1922 and 1939.

== L-1a, b, c, d ==
Lima-built L1c #2631 in 1930, after a bundle-type Elesco feedwater heater was added.

The first Mohawks delivered for the NYC were delivered by ALCO in 1916; these were purely freighters, with 69-inch drivers and small four axle tenders, though they would almost universally later be refitted with more six-axle examples. They would be equipped with the appropriate accouterment of the time; kerosene headlights, straight running boards, full pilots, Cole trailing trucks, and in some cases Russia iron boiler jackets.

Further orders of L-1 subclasses followed in subsequent years, all built by ALCO except the L-1cs, which would be built by the Lima Locomotive Works. These engines were built with clean lines and a notable lack of appliances, though they would be modified extensively in the coming years. As with the tenders, the earlier L-1s would later be fitted with feedwater heaters, with the majority sporting Elesco bundle-type and Coffin internal feedwater heaters, though a handful of examples on the subsidiary Peoria & Eastern (as well as one on the NYC proper) had open-cycle Worthington SA type units, and one each were furnished with the Elesco coil type (#2503) and the external Coffin variety. The vast majority of Elesco bundle-type equipped L-1s had them installed protruding forward, as seen universally on the L-2a subclass. However, there is evidence of at least one unit (#2568) having the feedwater heater installed in the semi-sunken fashion seen on some of the Central's H-7e Mikados.

One modification to the L-1s made in the 1920s was the installation of mechanical stokers, mostly of the duplex type, which were fitted universally, easing the job of the firemen. Many L-1s would also see their original fabricated Cole trailing trucks replaced with single-piece cast Deltas. Additionally, those constructed with full pilots would all have them swapped for footboard freight pilots by the 1920s. Some units would be fitted with booster-equipped trailing trucks, an invention of the New York Central's mechanical department.

185 L-1 locomotives were produced. The L-1a's were numbered 2500–2529, the L-1b's were numbered 2530–2584, the L-1c's were numbered 2585-2639 and the L-1d's were numbered 2640–2684. Interestingly, in the 1936 fleet-wide renumbering, the L-1s would remain untouched, retaining their as-built numbers.

When they were introduced in the late 1910's, the L-1s were the preeminent examples of hauling power on the New York Central, and served extensively on the main line from New York to Chicago. Gradually, as the L-2s rolled off ALCO's production line in the 1920s, many of the L-1s were displaced, with most of them stationed on the Central's Pennsylvania Division. As a consequence of the Great Depression and the associated decline in freight traffic, some were retired permanently or put into long-term storage.

By the late 1930s and the introduction of the L-3s, it was a rarity to see an L-1 outside those operating zones, where they served alongside the NE-2s, the NYC's articulated 2-6-6-2s. An exception would be the few operated by the Peoria and Eastern, which operated in Illinois and Indiana, though again they were largely limited in the scope of their travel. Much like their cousins on the Pennsylvania Division, they would last until the dieselization of the 1950s, and would all be retired by 1957.

== Experimental 3-cylindered ==
The New York Central had two L-1 locomotives, numbered 2518 and 2605, rebuilt by ALCO in 1922 with three cylinders to help determine if the arrangement was worthwhile. They were substantially more powerful than the two-cylinder models, but it was debatable if the additional maintenance requirements of a third, central cylinder, valve gear, main rod and crank axle were worth the performance boost. In 1924, locomotive 2569 was rebuilt by Alco as a Class L-1b-3 Cylinder. The NYC must have come down on the negative side of that question, for no more were built.

== L-2a, b, c, d ==
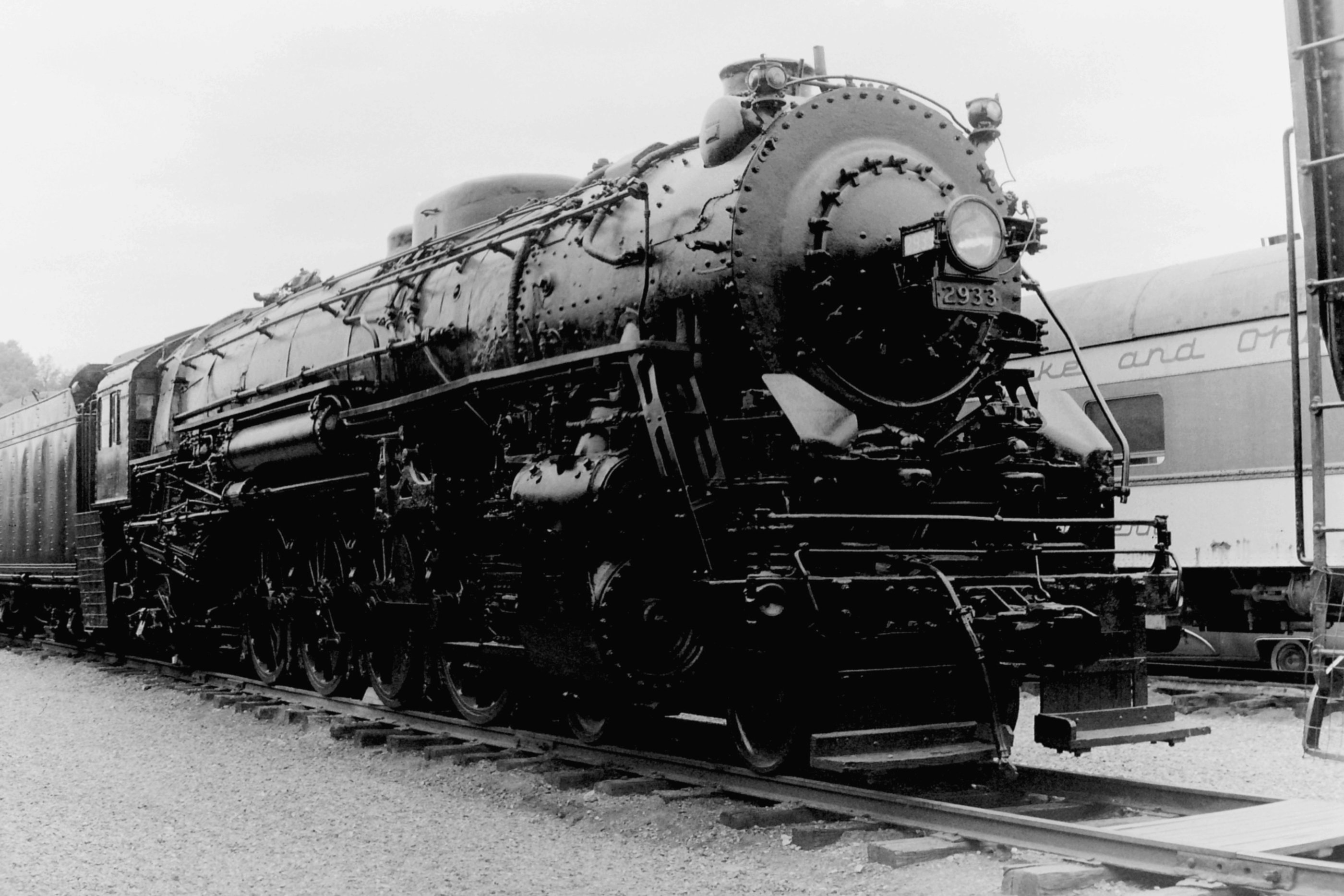
Preserved L-2d class locomotive Number 2933 at the Museum of Transportation in St. Louis in August, 1970

The next development of the Mohawk type for the New York Central was the L-2, 300 of its various subclasses being built between 1925 and 1930 by the American Locomotive Company. These were more modern locomotives than the L-1 class with wide boilers, long tenders, and fitted with feedwater heaters (mostly of the Elesco type and generally mounted in front of the smokebox at the top). Later L-2 subclasses, the L-2b and L-2d, had somewhat smoother lines with recessed feedwater heaters. With the L-2c having coffin heaters hidden inside the smokebox. The later L-2 locomotives, from a front-on view, appeared quite similar to the Central's fleet of Hudson passenger locomotives. The L2a's were numbered 2700–2799, the L2b's were numbered 2900–2924, the L2c's were numbered 2800-2899 and the L2d's were numbered 2925-2949 and 2950–2999. Locomotives 2995 and 2998 were modified for high-speed service in 1939.

== L-3a, b, c ==
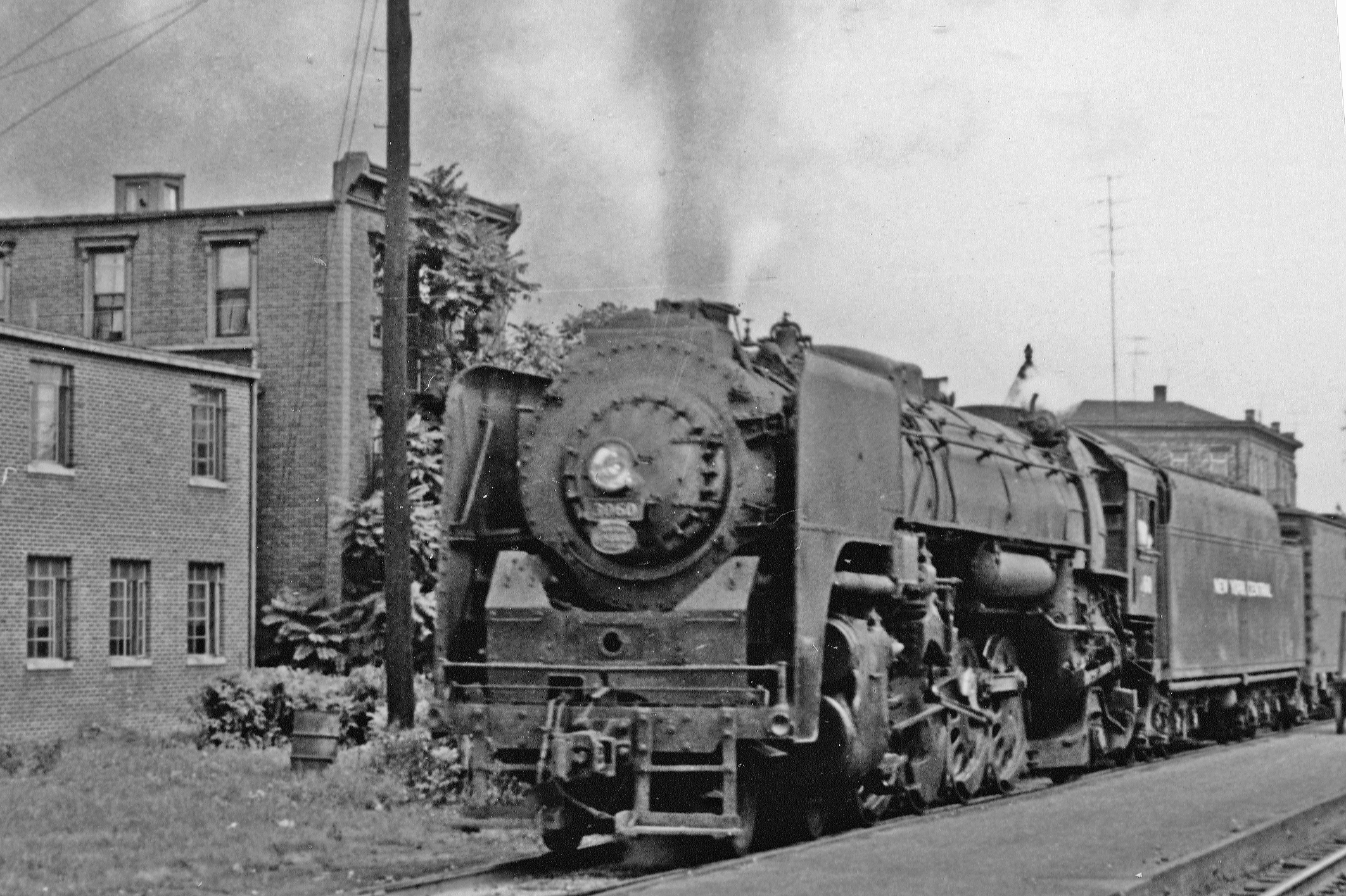
L-3c class locomotive number 3060 leads a freight train in Crestline, Ohio, on August 30, 1952

The next development of the Mohawk type was that of the dual-service locomotive, capable of working passenger as well as freight trains. Passenger service required the ability to work at 80 mph (130 km/h), as opposed to the 60 mph (97 km/h) required of freight. The NYC's fleet of Hudsons, 275 strong though it was, was proving inadequate to handle peak traffic demands, and some dual-purpose power would fix the problem nicely as well as giving the ability to handle express freight and mail services.

Two L-2 locomotives were given modifications for dual service work: higher boiler pressure, smaller cylinders, lightweight reciprocating parts, dynamic counterbalancing of the drivers, roller bearings on all axles and so forth. The success of these modifications prompted the construction of 65 units of the L-3 class in 1940, 25 of which were built for dual-service and the remaining 40 for freight-only; as a result, the first 25 were equipped with roller bearings on every axle while the remaining 40 had roller bearings on every axle except for the drivers. Other major difference between L-3as and L-3b/c included footboard pilots and the addition of a trailing truck booster engine used on the L-3b/c. The Class L-3a's were numbered 3000–3024, made by ALCO. The Class L-3b's were numbered 3025–3049, with ALCO producing the first ten (3025-3034) and Lima producing the remaining fifteen (3035-3049). The L-3c's were essentially 15 additional copies of the ALCO made L-3bs, numbered 3050–3064. All had oval NYC emblems under their smokebox engine number placards.

Notably, the Lima made L-3bs had a distinct smokebox front appearance, with a plated-over Elesco feedwater heater giving them their distinct look.

All L-3 locomotives were given axle-spacing that could accommodate 72" drivers, but only one was ever fitted with such. This locomotive, #3000, paved the way for the final class of Mohawks on the New York Central, the L-4. The other 64 engines received 69" drivers.

The L-3s ran up to 15,204 miles a month.

== L-4a, b’s ==
50 L-4 locomotives were produced by the Lima Locomotive Works in 1942. None of them had booster engines, although they were built to accommodate them should they ever need to start heavy trains, but were never so modified. The L-4s were versatile locomotives, with 72" drivers, and worked the heaviest freight and passenger trains during World War II.

The L-3 and L-4 classes had large tenders riding on two six-wheel trucks that were almost as long as the locomotives hauling them, and were mostly coal space with a capacity of 43 tons; water was taken en route using the tender scoop from track pans and thus the locomotives did not need to have a large on-board water capacity. Some L-4s had Scullin Disc drivers. The L4a's and L4b's were numbered 3100-3124 and 3125–3149, respectively, and all were equipped with roller bearings on every axle. All L-4a's bore the above-described NYC "passenger" logo plates underneath their front smokebox number plates.

Many L-4 locomotives were fitted with smoke deflectors around 1945/46, after initial delivery in 1942 and ran up to 24,181 miles a month.

== Preservation ==
Only two Mohawks out of the original 600 built are preserved. One of them, No. 2933, is a 1929 ALCO-built L-2d and resides at the National Museum of Transportation, Kirkwood, Missouri. The other Mohawk, No. 3001, is a 1940 ALCO-built L-3a at the National New York Central Railroad Museum in Elkhart, Indiana and is the largest surviving NYC steam locomotive. In October 2024, the Fort Wayne Railroad Historical Society announced that they had acquired No. 3001 and made plans to eventually restore it to operating condition.

Two Mohawk tenders also still exist. The tender from 2662, a class L-1d, is currently in use behind Western Maryland Scenic Railroad 734 (ex-Lake Superior and Ishpeming Railroad 2-8-0 34) in Cumberland, Maryland. The tender for L-3b 3042 was converted into a canteen and was used with Reading T-1 4-8-4 2101 during its 1976 tour with the American Freedom Train, as well as with the Chessie System Special. It was later damaged in a roundhouse fire in 1979. This water tender is currently behind L3a 3001 at the National New York Central Railroad Museum in Elkhart, Indiana. The tender was sold to the Fort Wayne Railroad Historical Society in September 2023 along with 3001.

== See also ==
- PRR M1, The Pennsylvania Railroad's version of the Mohawks
- 4-8-2, a dual mode "mountain" type steam locomotive
