= Delaware, Lackawanna and Western 1151 class =

Lackawanna 1151 class
Type and origin
- Power type: Steam
- Builder: American Locomotive Company
- Build date: 1937
- Total produced: 5
Specifications
- Configuration
  - Whyte: 4-6-4
  - UIC: 2′C2′ h2
- Driver dia.: 80 in (2,032 mm)
- Length: 93 ft 7 in (28.52 m)
- Adhesive weight: 198,000 lb (90,000 kilograms; 90 metric tons)
- Loco weight: 377,000 lb (171,000 kilograms; 171 metric tons)
- Total weight: 690,100 lb (313,000 kilograms; 313.0 metric tons)
- Fuel type: Coal
- Fuel capacity: 52,000 lb (24,000 kilograms; 24 metric tons)
- Water cap.: 15,800 US gal (60,000 L; 13,200 imp gal)
- Firebox
  - Grate area: 81.5 sq ft (7.57 m^{2})
- Boiler pressure: 245 lbf/in^{2} (1.69 MPa)
- Cylinders: Two
- Cylinder size: 26 in × 30 in (660 mm × 762 mm)
- Valve gear: Baker
Performance figures
- Tractive effort: 52,790 lbf (234.8 kN)
- Factor of adh.: 3.75
Career
- Operators: Delaware, Lackawanna and Western Railroad
- Numbers: 1151–1155
- Retired: 1951–1953
- Disposition: All scrapped

The Delaware, Lackawanna and Western Railroad's 1151 class comprised five 4-6-4 steam locomotives built by the American Locomotive Company (ALCO) in 1937. They were the last steam locomotives ordered by the railroad.

They were ordered to improve service on the Lackawanna's express passenger trains west of Scranton, Pennsylvania, towards Buffalo, New York. Apart from a six-mile helper district just west of Scranton and Dansville Hill between Groveland and Perkinsville, New York, this was flat, high-speed running. The railroad's existing 4-8-2 "Mountain" types were proving increasingly inadequate for this service as train lengths increased and because of the drag of air-conditioning equipment. However, the railroad's existing 4-8-4 "Pocono" types, used east of Scranton, were bigger and more powerful than this service required and such use would be wasteful. Therefore, the DL&W ordered five powerful Hudsons dedicated for this service.

Being the only DL&W locomotives dedicated to flat-land service, they had driving wheels of 80 inches (2,032 mm), which were the largest used on the system. They were not equipped with booster engines – unusual for a 4-6-4 – instead relying on their starting tractive effort of 52,790 pounds-force (234.8 kN). While not quite equal to the Mountain types they replaced, their available power at speed was far greater. They were built alongside the New York Central Railroad's J-3a Hudsons at ALCO's plant in Schenectady, New York, which differed in being less powerful and booster-equipped, as well as being equipped with tenders with water scoops for track pans. The two classes had somewhat close total weights and axle loading and bore a superficial resemblance to one another.

To keep all the Lackawanna's six-drivered passenger power together in the 11xx number series, the new locomotives were numbered 1151–1155, taking the place of several Pacifics that had been recently converted into 0-8-0 switchers.

The five locomotives only lasted ten years in their original intended assignments, since the Lackawanna dieselized its express passenger trains in 1947. The Hudsons were relegated to lesser assignments such as commuter trains, and began to be seen on the eastern end of the railroad. One assignment was the early morning Merchants Express (Train 26) from Scranton to Hoboken, New Jersey, returning in the late afternoon hauling the Scrantonian (Train 11). Another was the Interstate Express (Train 1301), received from the Reading Railroad/Jersey Central at Taylor Junction, near Scranton, and hauled to Binghamton, New York. They also saw service between Binghamton and Syracuse on the Syracuse Branch.

Even in this service, they did not last long. All five were withdrawn from service in 1951–1953 and subsequently scrapped; none of the railroad's later steam locomotives survived the cutter's torch.
