= South African type JT tender =

South African train

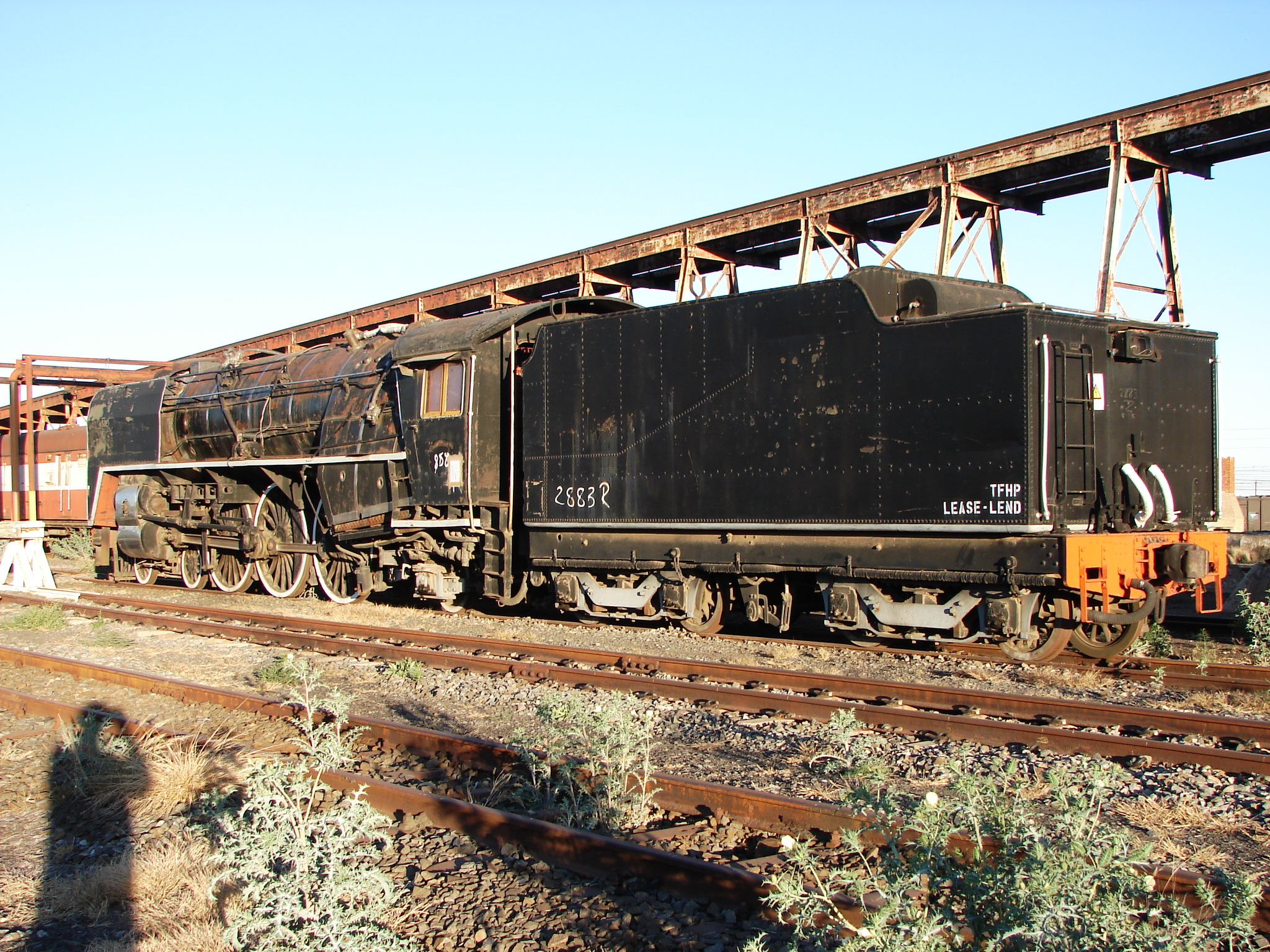
- Type JT tender on Class 16E, 18 September 2015
Type and origin
- Locomotive: Class 15E, Class 15F, Class 16E
- Designer: Allan Watson
- Builder: Berliner Maschinenbau; Beyer, Peacock & Company; Henschel & Son; North British Locomotive Company; Robert Stephenson & Hawthorns
- In service: 1935-1946
Specifications
- Configuration: 2-axle bogies
- Gauge: 3 ft 6 in (1,067 mm) Cape gauge
- Length: 30 ft 9 7/16 in (9,384 mm)
- Wheel dia.: 34 in (864 mm)
- Wheelbase: 20 ft 5 in (6,223 mm)
  - Bogie: 6 ft 2 in (1,880 mm)
- Axle load: 17 LT 15 cwt (18,030 kg)
  - Front bogie: 33 LT 18 cwt (34,440 kg)
  - Rear bogie: 35 LT 10 cwt (36,070 kg)
- Weight empty: 66,416 lb (30,126 kg)
- Weight w/o: 69 LT 8 cwt (70,510 kg)
- Fuel type: Coal
- Fuel cap.: 14 LT (14.2 t)
- Water cap.: 6,000 imp gal (27,300 L)
- Stoking: Manual
- Couplers: Drawbar & AAR knuckle
Career
- Operators: South African Railways
- Numbers: 854-859, 2858-3056

The South African type JT tender was a steam locomotive tender.

Type JT tenders first entered service in 1935 as tenders to the Class 15E 4-8-2 Mountain and Class 16E 4-6-2 Pacific steam locomotives which were placed in service by the South African Railways in that year. Until 1946, more entered service as tenders to more Class 15E and the Class 15F.

== Manufacturers ==
Type JT tenders were built between 1935 and 1945 by Berliner Maschinenbau, Beyer, Peacock & Company, Henschel & Son, North British Locomotive Company and Robert Stephenson & Hawthorns.

In 1935, the South African Railways (SAR) placed six Class 16E express passenger steam locomotives in service, numbered in the range from 854 to 859. The engines and tenders were built by Henschel to the design of Allan Watson Chief Mechanical Engineer (CME) of the SAR at the time, and were initially placed in service at Kimberley to work named trains like the Union Limited and the Union Express southwards to Beaufort West and northwards to Johannesburg respectively.

In the same year, the first twenty Class 15E locomotives entered service, built by Robert Stephenson & Hawthorns, numbered in the range from 2858 to 2877 and nicknamed Bongol.

The Type JT first entered service as tenders to these two locomotive classes. Between 1935 and 1946, more entered service as tenders to the Classes 15E and 15F.

== Characteristics ==
The original Type JT tenders were arranged for manual stoking. On tenders which were delivered between 1939 and 1945 with Class 15F numbers 2923 to 3056, provision was made in the design to convert them to mechanical stoking later. These were built by North British and Beyer, Peacock to the design and specifications of W Day, who succeeded AG Watson as CME in 1936. A mechanical stoker was later tested on no. 2923, before the remaining locomotives of this group were all equipped with mechanical stokers by the late 1940s.

The tender rode on four-wheeled bogies and was virtually identical to the subsequent Type ET tender which was built with a mechanical stoker. Like the Type ET, it also had a 14 long tons (14.2 tonnes) coal capacity and a maximum axle load of 17 long tons 15 hundredweight (18,030 kilograms), but a 380 imperial gallons (1,730 litres) larger water capacity of 6,000 imperial gallons (27,300 litres). Its empty weight was 1,232 pounds (559 kilograms) less due to the absence of mechanical stoking equipment. These appear to have been the only differences between the Types JT and ET tenders.

== Locomotives ==
Three locomotive classes, built by five manufacturers, were delivered new with Type JT tenders which were numbered for their engines in the number ranges as shown. An oval number plate, bearing the engine number and often also the tender type, was attached to the rear end of the tender.

- 1935: Class 16E, numbers 854 to 859.
- 1935-1937: Class 15E, numbers 2858 to 2901.
- 1938-1945: Class 15F, numbers 2902 to 3056.

== Classification letters ==
Since many tender types are interchangeable between different locomotive classes and types, a tender classification system was adopted by the SAR. The first letter of the tender type indicates the classes of engines to which it can be coupled. The "J_" tenders could be used with the locomotive classes as shown.

- Class 15E.
- Class 15F, if arranged for manual stoking.
- Class 16E.
- Class S1.

The second letter indicates the tender's water capacity. The "_T" tenders had a capacity of between 5,587 and 6,000 imperial gallons (25,400 and 27,300 litres; 6,710 and 7,210 US gallons).

A number, when added after the letter code, indicates differences between similar tender types, such as function, wheelbase or coal bunker capacity.

== Illustration ==
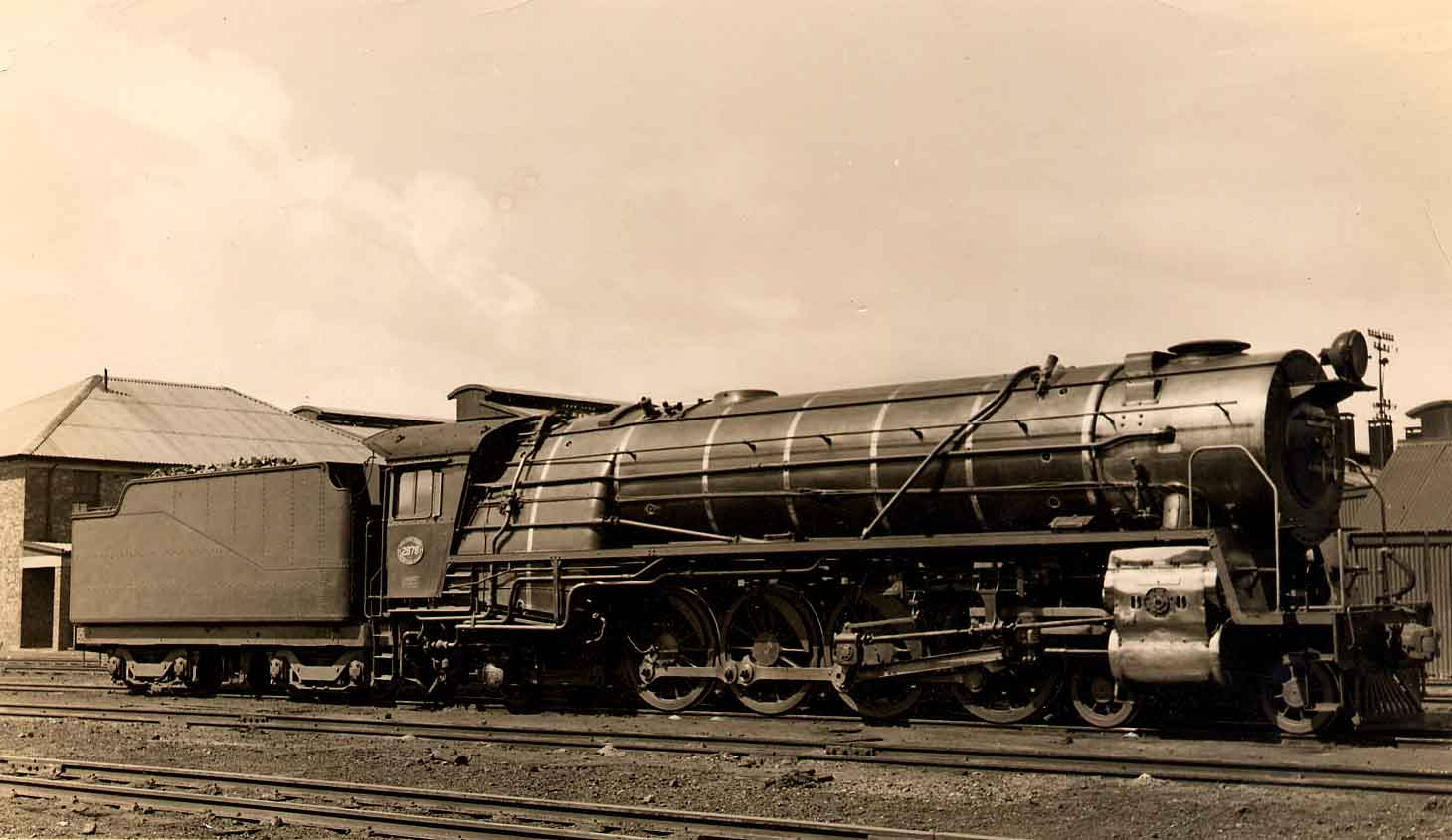
Type JT tender on Class 15E, c. 1940

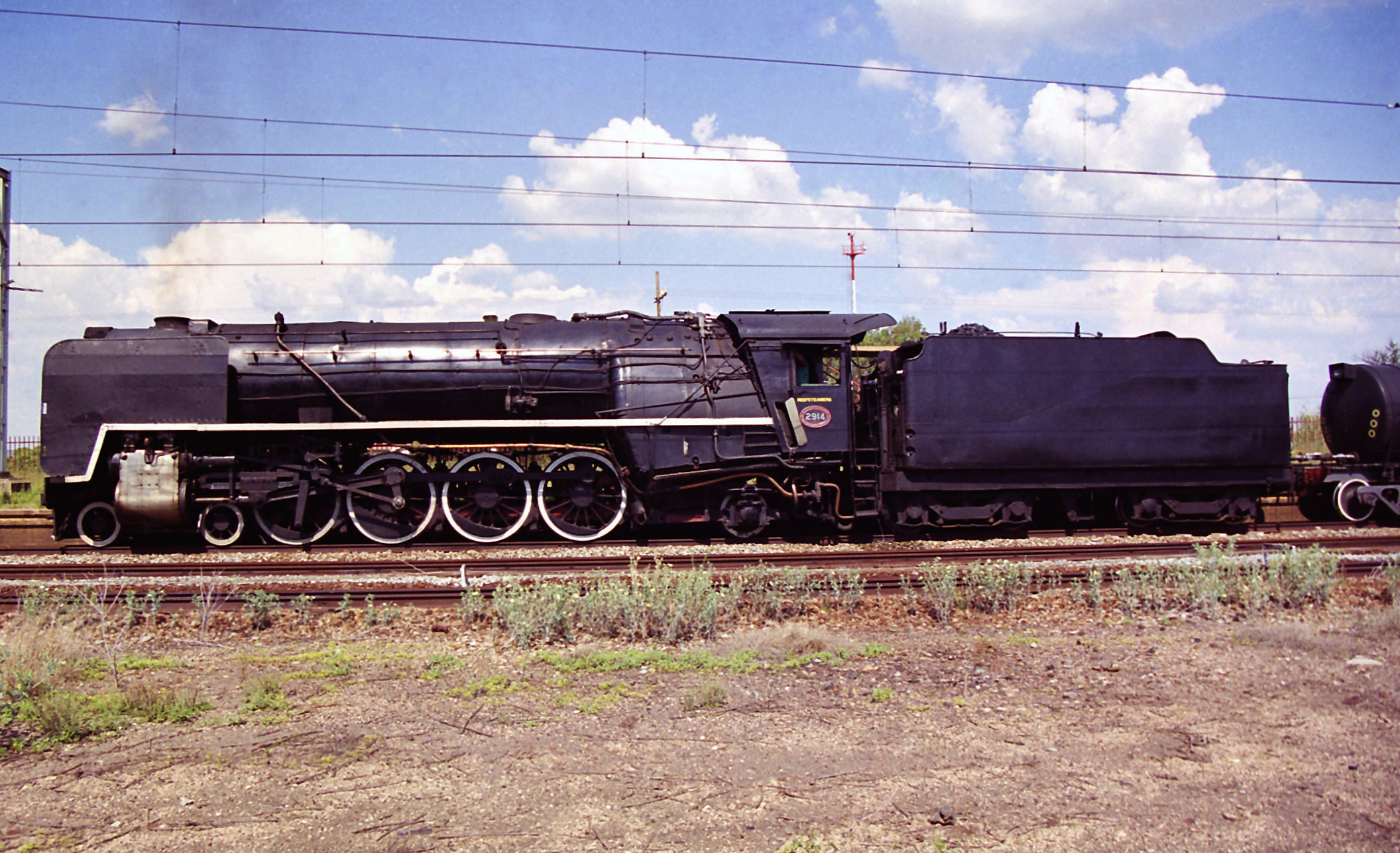
Type JT tender on Class 15F, 1 November 2000
