= South African Class 16E 4-6-2 =

1935 design of steam locomotive

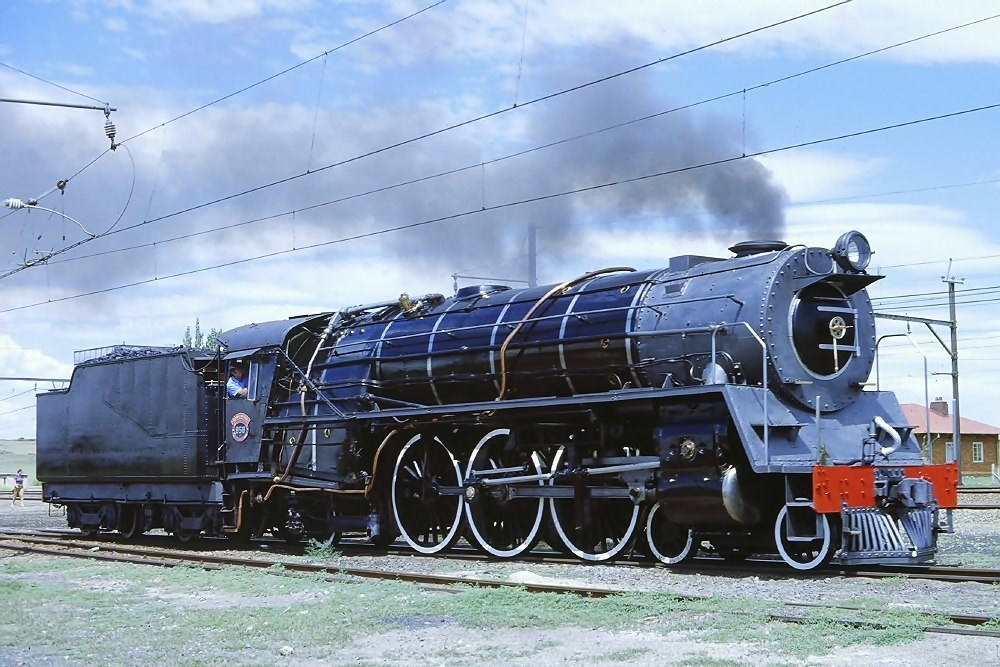
- No. 858 Betty at Vetrivier, 5 November 1979
Type and origin
- Power type: Steam
- Designer: South African Railways (A.G. Watson)
- Builder: Henschel and Son
- Serial number: 22583-22588
- Model: Class 16E
- Build date: 1935
- Total produced: 6
Specifications
- Configuration
  - Whyte: 4-6-2 (Pacific)
  - UIC: 2'C1'h2
- Driver: 2nd coupled axle
- Gauge: 3 ft 6 in (1,067 mm) Cape gauge
- Leading dia.: 34 in (864 mm)
- Coupled dia.: 72 in (1,829 mm)
- Trailing dia.: 34 in (864 mm)
- Tender wheels: 34 in (864 mm)
- Wheelbase: 63 ft 5 3/16 in (19,334 mm)
  - Engine: 33 ft 7 in (10,236 mm)
  - Leading: 7 ft 2 in (2,184 mm)
  - Coupled: 12 ft 3 1/2 in (3,746 mm)
  - Tender: 20 ft 5 in (6,223 mm)
  - Tender bogie: 6 ft 2 in (1,880 mm)
- Length
  - Over couplers: 71 ft 8 3/16 in (21,849 mm)
- Height: 13 ft (3,962 mm)
- Frame type: Bar
- Axle load: 20 LT 19 cwt (21,290 kg)
  - Leading: 19 LT 14 cwt (20,020 kg)
  - 1st coupled: 19 LT 8 cwt (19,710 kg)
  - 2nd coupled: 20 LT 19 cwt (21,290 kg)
  - 3rd coupled: 19 LT 7 cwt (19,660 kg)
  - Trailing: 18 LT 7 cwt (18,640 kg)
  - Tender bogie: Bogie 1: 33 LT 18 cwt (34,440 kg); Bogie 2: 35 LT 10 cwt (36,070 kg)
  - Tender axle: 17 LT 15 cwt (18,030 kg)
- Adhesive weight: 59 LT 14 cwt (60,660 kg)
- Loco weight: 97 LT 15 cwt (99,320 kg)
- Tender weight: 69 LT 8 cwt (70,510 kg)
- Total weight: 167 LT 3 cwt (169,800 kg)
- Tender type: JT (2-axle bogies); JT, JV permitted
- Fuel type: Coal
- Fuel capacity: 14 LT (14.2 t)
- Water cap.: 6,000 imp gal (27,300 L)
- Firebox
  - Type: Round-top
  - Grate area: 63 sq ft (5.9 m^{2})
- Boiler
  - Model: Watson Standard no. 3A
  - Type: Domeless
  - Pitch: 9 ft 3 in (2,819 mm)
  - Diameter: 6 ft 2 1/4 in (1,886 mm)
  - Tube plates: 19 ft 1/2 in (5,804 mm)
  - Small tubes: 136: 2 1/2 in (64 mm)
  - Large tubes: 36: 5 1/2 in (140 mm)
- Boiler pressure: 210 psi (1,448 kPa)
- Safety valve: Pop
- Heating surface
  - Firebox: 206 sq ft (19.1 m^{2})
  - Tubes: 2,682 sq ft (249.2 m^{2})
  - Arch tubes: 26 sq ft (2.4 m^{2})
  - Total surface: 2,914 sq ft (270.7 m^{2})
- Superheater
  - Heating area: 592 sq ft (55.0 m^{2})
- Cylinders: Two
- Cylinder size: 24 in (610 mm) bore 28 in (711 mm) stroke
- Valve gear: Rotary cam
- Valve type: Poppet
- Couplers: AAR knuckle
Performance figures
- Maximum speed: 136 km (85 mi) when pulling a 350-ton train
- Tractive effort: 35,280 lbf (156.9 kN) @ 75%
Career
- Operators: South African Railways
- Class: Class 16E
- Number in class: 6
- Numbers: 854–859
- Delivered: 1935
- First run: 1935
- Withdrawn: 1972
- The 2nd coupled axle had flangeless wheels

The South African Railways Class 16E 4-6-2 of 1935 is a class of passenger steam locomotive.

In 1935, the South African Railways placed six Class 16E steam locomotives with a 4-6-2 wheel arrangement in express passenger train service.

== Manufacturer ==
Following the Great Depression in South Africa of 1930–1933, the South African Railways (SAR) set out to improve its Cape Town-Johannesburg express passenger service. To attain higher average speeds for its more important express trains, the Class 16E was designed by A.G. Watson, Chief Mechanical Engineer of the SAR from 1929 to 1936, specifically for use with the Union Express and the Union Limited trains. Six locomotives were built by Henschel and Son in Kassel, Germany and delivered in 1935, numbered in the range from 854 to 859.

== Characteristics ==
With its 72 inches (1,830 millimetres) diameter coupled wheels, the Class 16E was considered the most remarkable Cape gauge express passenger locomotive ever built. It had the largest fire grate on any Pacific outside North America. The coupled wheels were the largest ever used on a narrow-gauge locomotive, and it had a service weight and tractive effort equal to or exceeding most Pacifics outside North America.

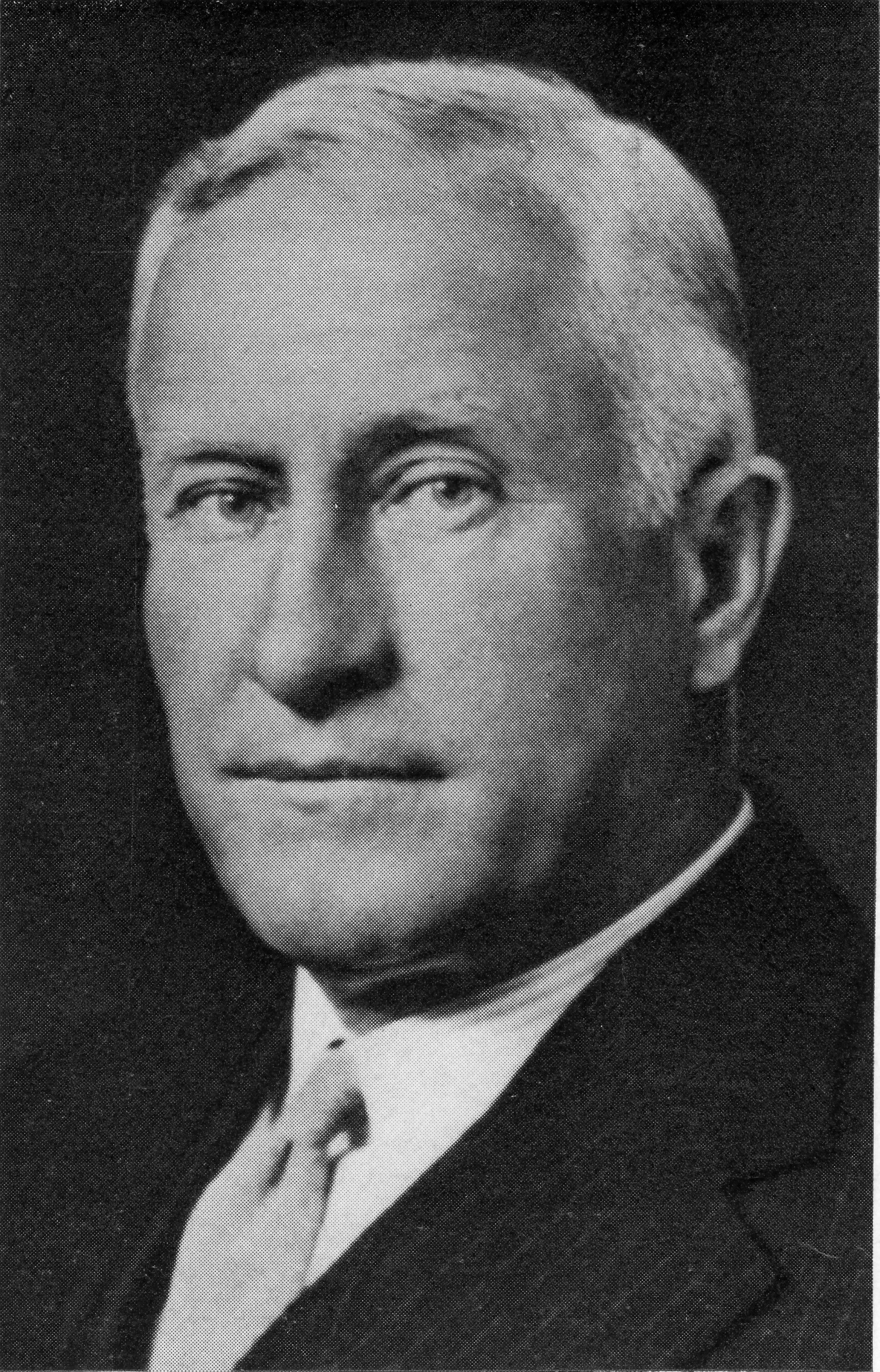
A.G. Watson

Watson experienced considerable difficulty keeping the axle loads within the permissible limits specified by the Chief Civil Engineer, resulting in the ashpan, cab, side running boards and several other parts being made of thinner material than usual. Even the original number plates were cast in aluminium. Still, the axle load of 20 long tons 19 hundredweight (21,290 kilograms) was the heaviest of any engine or vehicle on the SAR at the time.

Along with the Class 15E Mountain type of 1935, the locomotive introduced the Type JT tender with a coal capacity of 14 long tons (14.2 tonnes), a water capacity of 6,000 imperial gallons (27,300 litres) and an axle load of 17 long tons 15 hundredweight (18,030 kilograms).

The main bar frames were machined from rolled steel slabs and each frame was in one piece from front to back. The wheels were fitted with hollow crank pins, while the leading bogie was fitted with an oil bath centre pivot. The connecting and coupling rods were fitted with floating bronze bushes and were made of special chrome-nickel alloy steel of fluted section. The centre driving set of coupled wheels were flangeless and had wider treads than the other two sets to prevent them from slipping off the rails in sharp curves.

To obtain increased tractive effort with the large coupled wheels, larger cylinders of 24 inches (610 millimetres) bore by 28 inches (711 millimetres) stroke were used. This, along with a boiler pressure of 210 pounds per square inch (1,448 kilopascals), gave the locomotive a tractive effort of 35,280 pounds-force (156.9 kilonewtons) at 75% of boiler pressure. Each cylinder was cast integral with half of the smokebox saddle, which made the castings interchangeable.

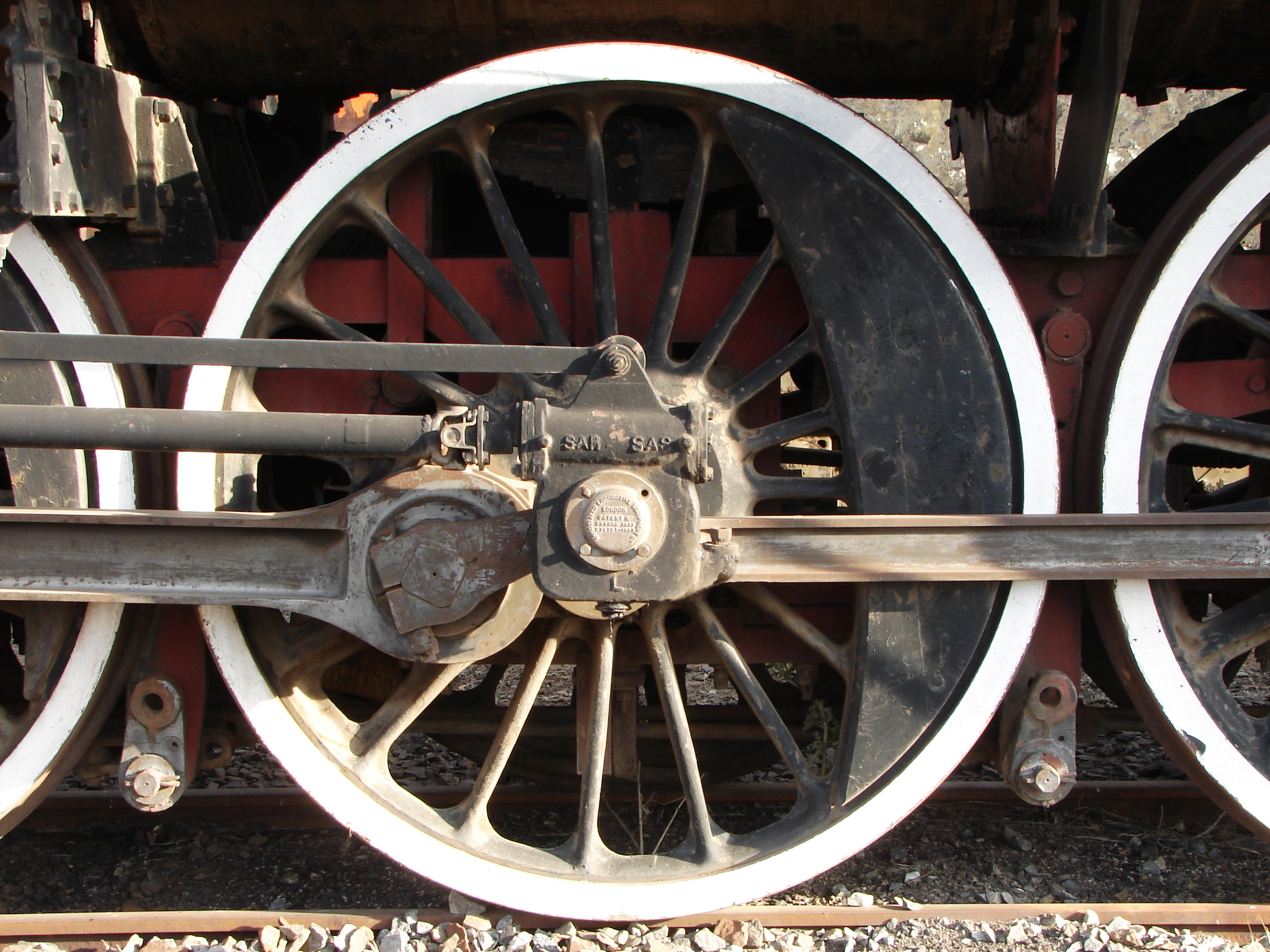
The drive shafts that turn the poppet valve camshafts are no different from those found under most rear wheel drive cars and trucks

Given the successful operation of rotary cam poppet valves on the Class 19C, they were also used on the Class 16E. The valves were driven by outside rotary propshafts from turning mechanisms mounted on the driving coupled wheels. The valves were double-seated and housed at each end of the cylinders, an arrangement that resulted in short and straight ports between the valves and the cylinder barrels. The admission valves were 8 inches (203 millimetres) in diameter and the exhaust valves 9 inches (229 millimetres). Most of the detail parts of the rotary cam gear, particularly the main drive and reversing gear, were interchangeable with similar parts on the Class 19C. The poppet valve gear gave the engine extremely free-running characteristics.

The Class 16E was delivered with a Watson Standard no. 3A boiler, one of the range of standard boiler types designed by Watson as part of his standardisation policy. The boiler was designed for a maximum working pressure of 225 pounds per square inch (1,551 kilopascals) and the boiler barrel plates and firebox outer shell were of nickel steel. The boiler and the firebox were entirely clothed with Alfol insulation.

At 9 feet 3 inches (2,819 millimetres) above rail level, the Class 16E boiler centre-line was the highest-pitched on the SAR at the time. Because of this and the limitations of the loading gauge, the boiler was domeless with an inspection manhole on top of the boiler barrel where the dome would have been. Steam was collected through numerous small feeder pipes fixed into two collector pipes which were arranged as high as possible above the water surface. The collector pipes then joined to form a main steam pipe, 7 inches (178 millimetres) in diameter, which led to the superheater header and multiple valve regulator located in the smokebox. The steam pipes from the header to each cylinder were 6 inches (152 millimetres) in diameter. The boiler was fitted with two large Pop safety valves mounted ahead of the firebox, one on either side of the boiler and angled about 80 degrees apart.

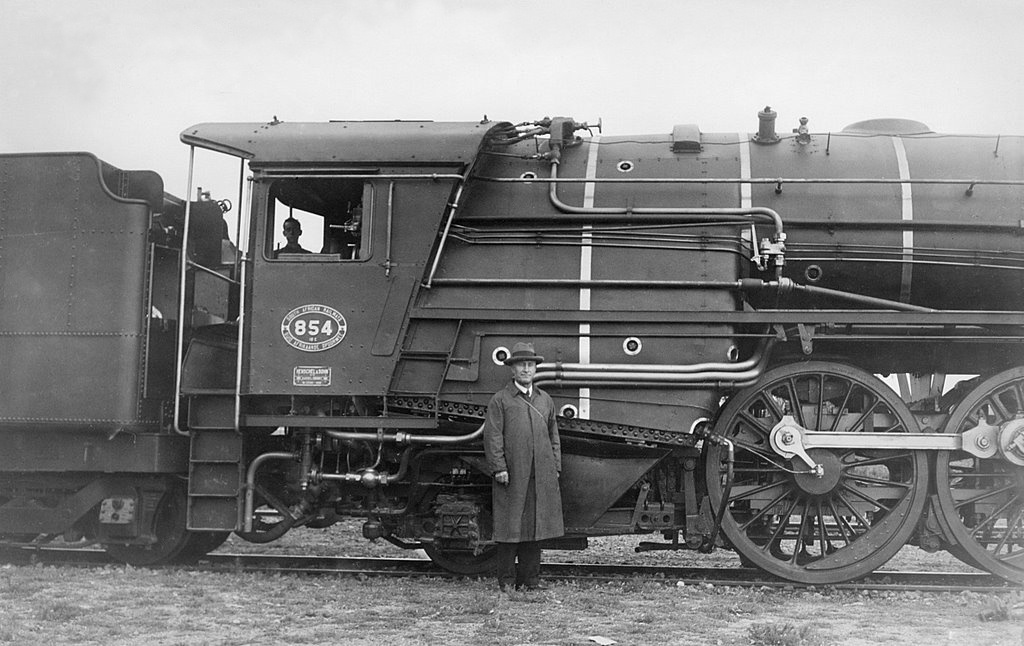
A.G. Watson with his Class 16E, c. 1935

The firebox had a power-operated Ajax fire-door and the grate was of the sectional pin-hole type, fitted with power-operated shaking gear. To assist in keeping within the axle load limits, the ashpan was constructed of relatively thin anti-corrosive steel plates of a special heat-resisting quality. The brick arch was supported by five 3 inches (76 millimetres) diameter arch tubes. The firebox was fitted with SAR standard type flexible stays and to allow easier access to the stays, the engine was equipped with a Watson cab with its slanted front which, like the Watson Standard boiler, was to become the standard on later SAR steam locomotive classes. The cab was of special light steel and was welded throughout.

== Service ==
The class was placed in service at Kimberley and regularly worked trains like the Union Express and Union Limited southward to Beaufort West and northward to Johannesburg respectively. The Union train was to become the Blue Train after the Second World War. Although the locomotives were never stationed at Braamfontein Loco in Johannesburg, they were serviced there when working between Kimberley and Johannesburg.

They proved to be very successful, efficient and economical in service when handling loads within their capacity. When the original wooden-bodied coaches of the Union trains were replaced with heavier steel-bodied, air-conditioned coaches in 1939, the load increased to 600 long tons (610 tonnes) or more, making the Class 16E inadequate for them and were thus relocated to Bloemfontein in the Orange Free State.

From here they hauled regular passenger trains, including the Orange Express, working north to Johannesburg and south to De Aar as well as across to Kimberley. When air-conditioned lounge cars were added to trains like the Orange Express and Trans-Karoo, they were again considered incapable of handling the additional load and were eventually withdrawn from service in 1972.

== Preservation ==
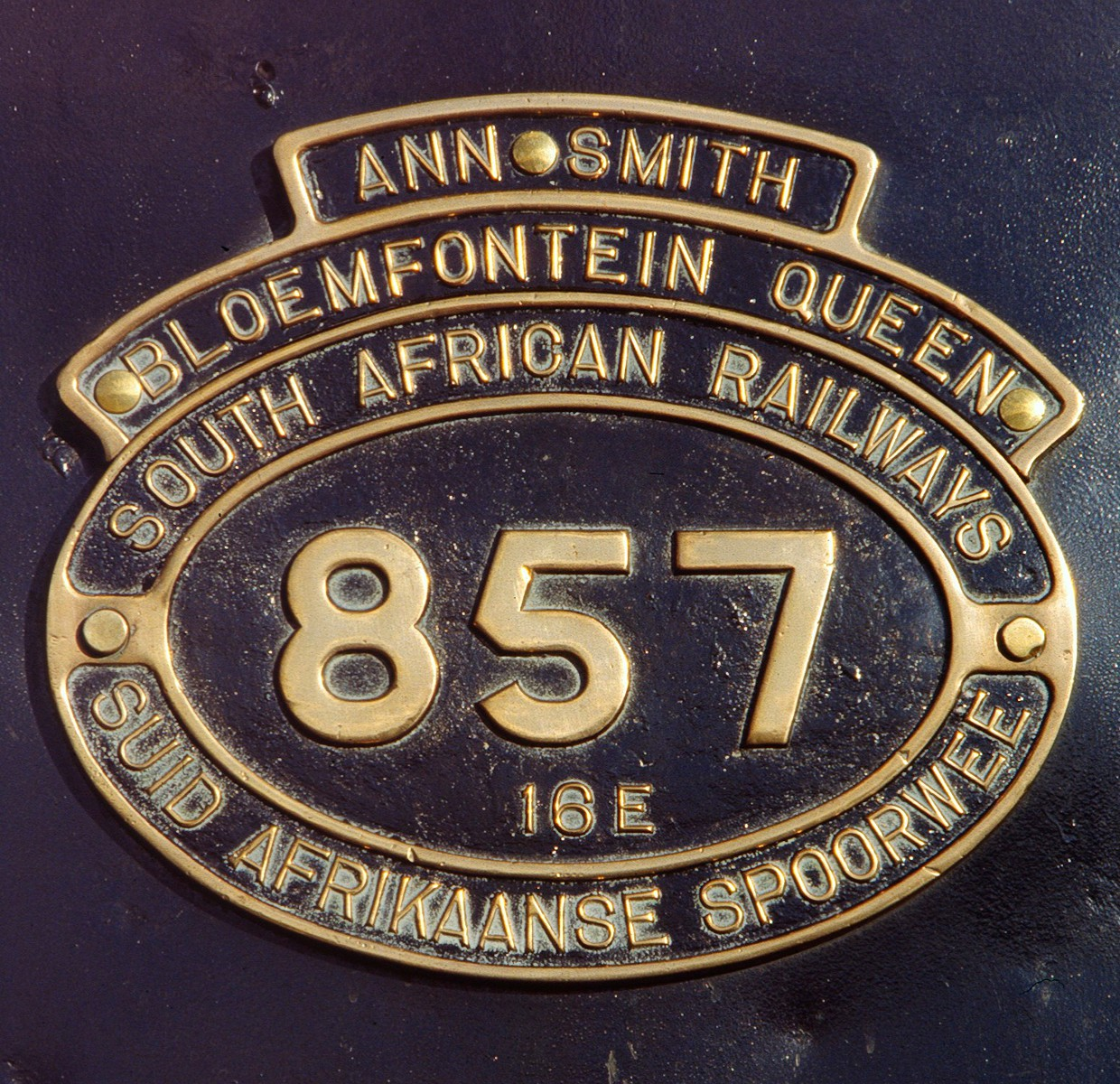

When Watson retired in 1936, no. 858 was officially named after him. It carried the name Allan G Watson above its number plates on the cab sides. By the time the Class 16E was withdrawn from service, this engine bore the name Betty below the headlight.

Two locomotives survive and were still relatively intact by 2015. No. 858 Betty was stored in the open at Beaconsfield in Kimberley while no. 857 Ann Smith • Bloemfontein Queen was in storage at Bloemfontein, parked under cover at the locomotive depot.

Number	Works no.	THF / Private	Leaselend / Owner	Current Location
857	Hensc 22586	THF	Transnet Heritage Foundation (Museum)	Bloemfontein Locomotive Depot
858	Hensc 22587	THF	Steamnet 2000	Kimberley Locomotive Depot

== Commemoration ==
A 20c postage stamp depicting a Class 16E locomotive was one of a set of four commemorative postage stamps issued by the South African Post Office on 27 April 1983 to commemorate the steam locomotives of South Africa that were rapidly being withdrawn from service at the time. The artwork and stamp design was by the noted stamp designer and artist Hein Botha. The locomotive depicted was Class 16E no. 858. The outline of a traditional SAR locomotive number plate was used as a commemorative cancellation for De Aar on the date of issue.

== Illustration ==
Class 16E locomotives were equipped with smoke deflectors in later years.

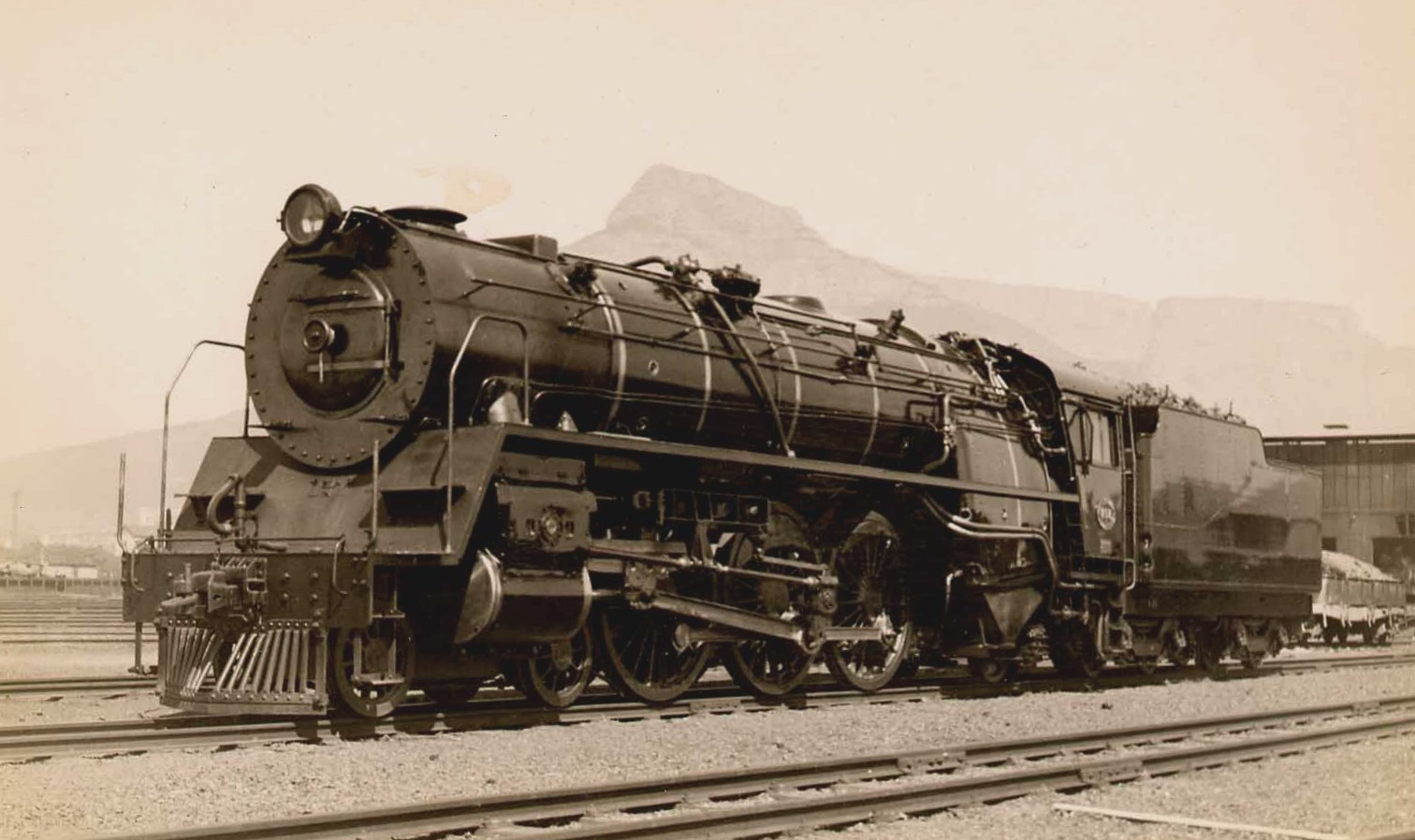
No. 854 at Paardeneiland Loco, Cape Town, c. 1935

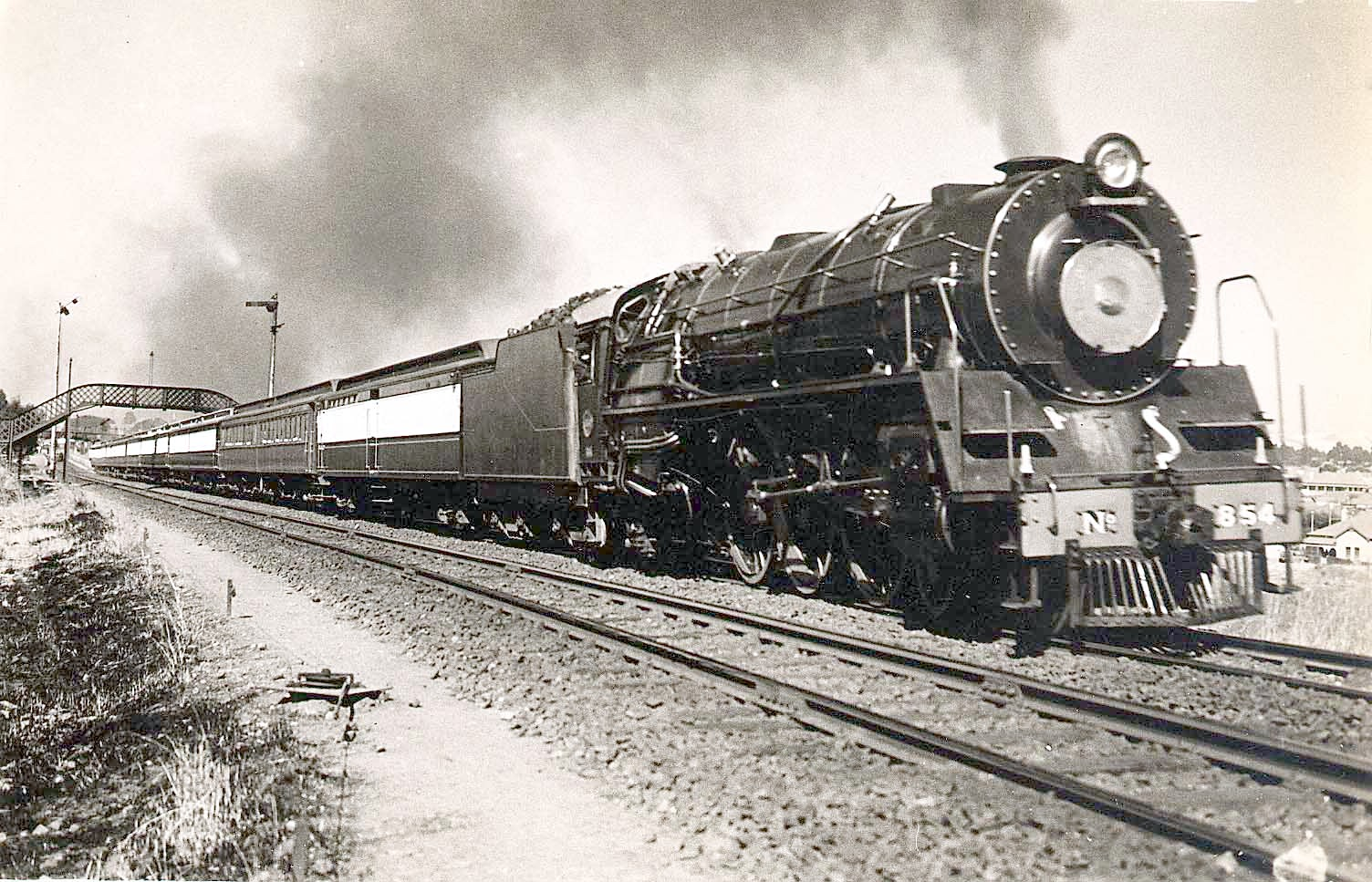
No. 854 on the Union Limited near Roodepoort, c. 1936

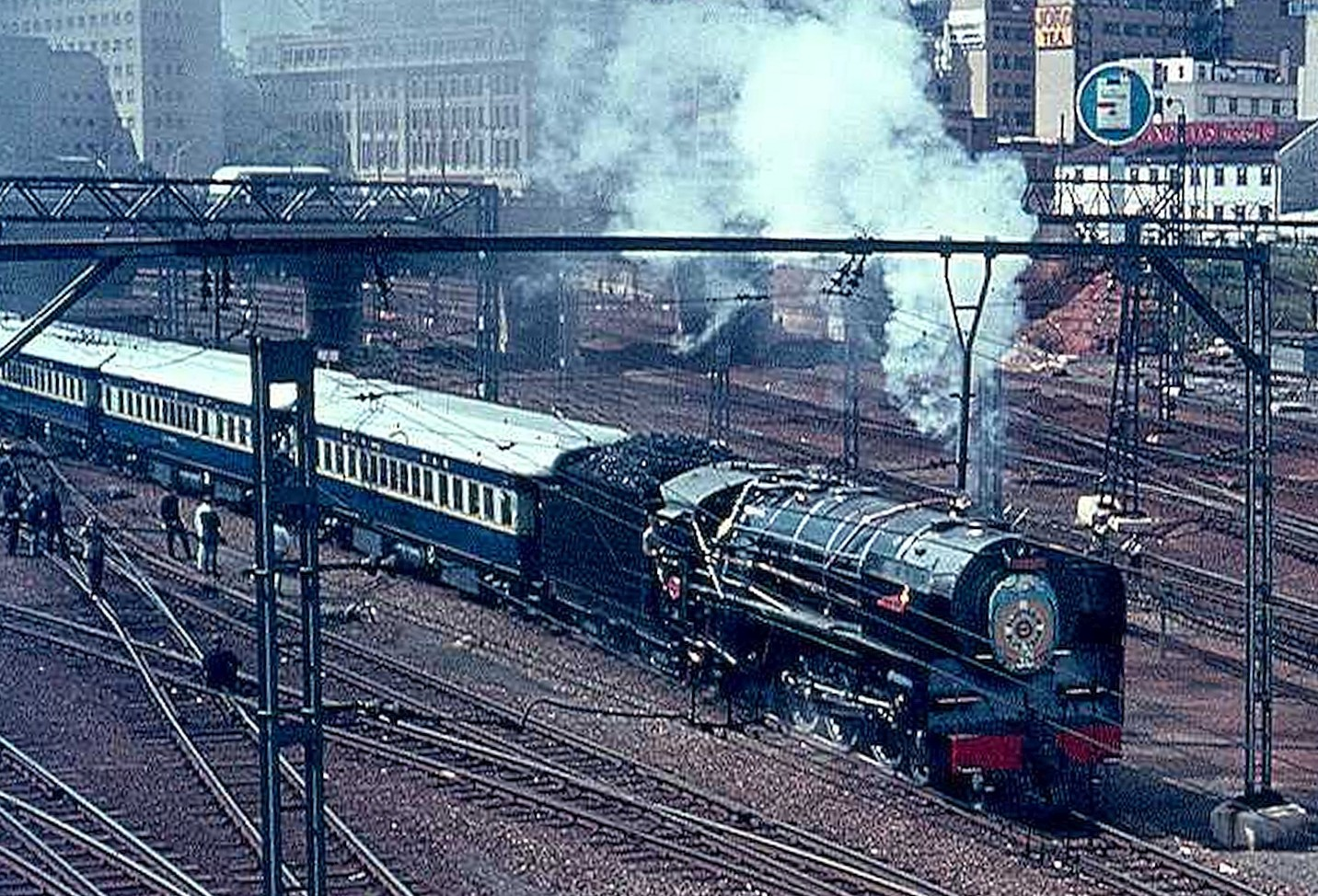
No. 858 leaving Johannesburg on the Blue Train, c. 1969

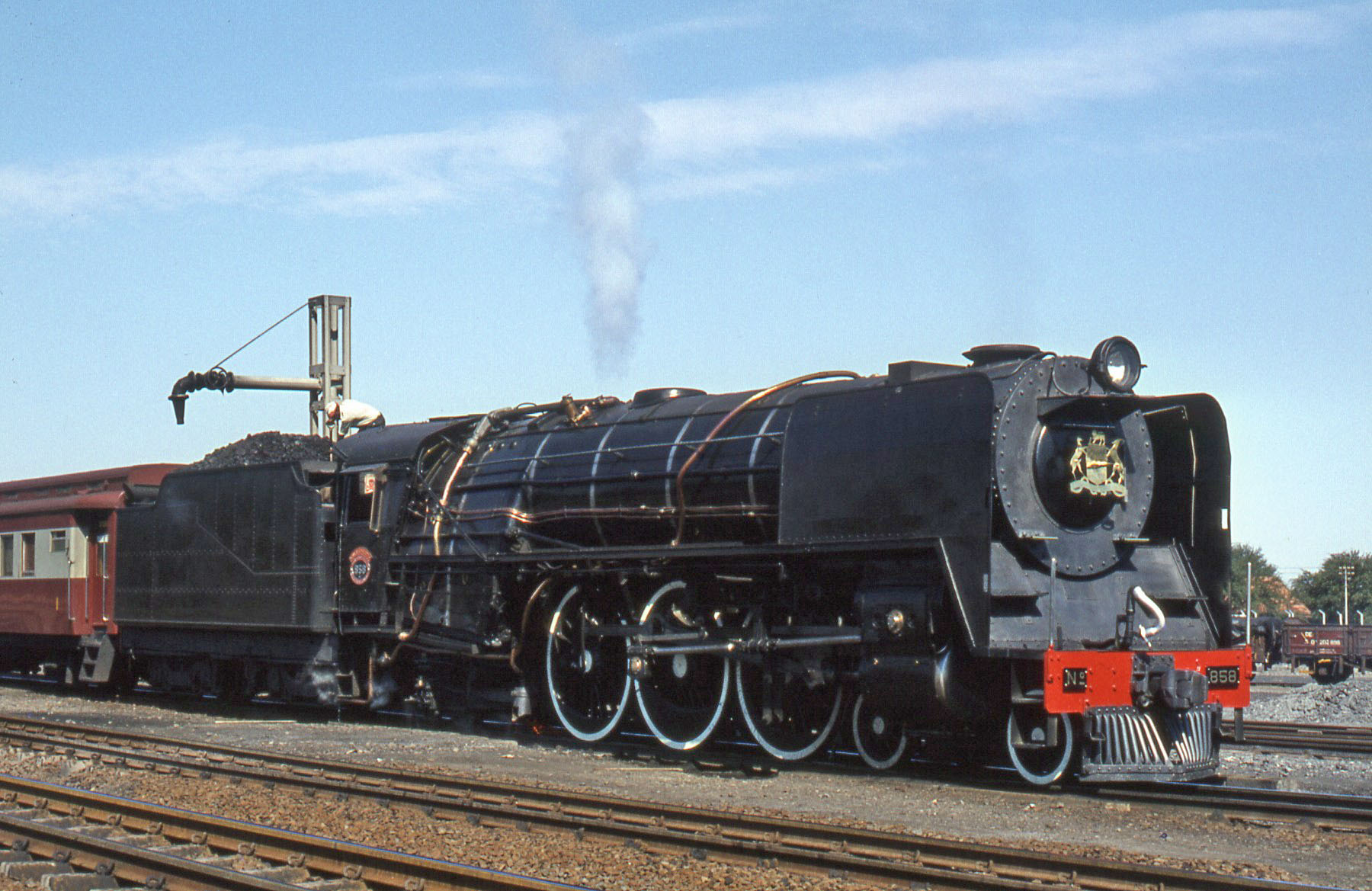
No. 858 with smoke deflectors at Orange River station, 23 April 1981

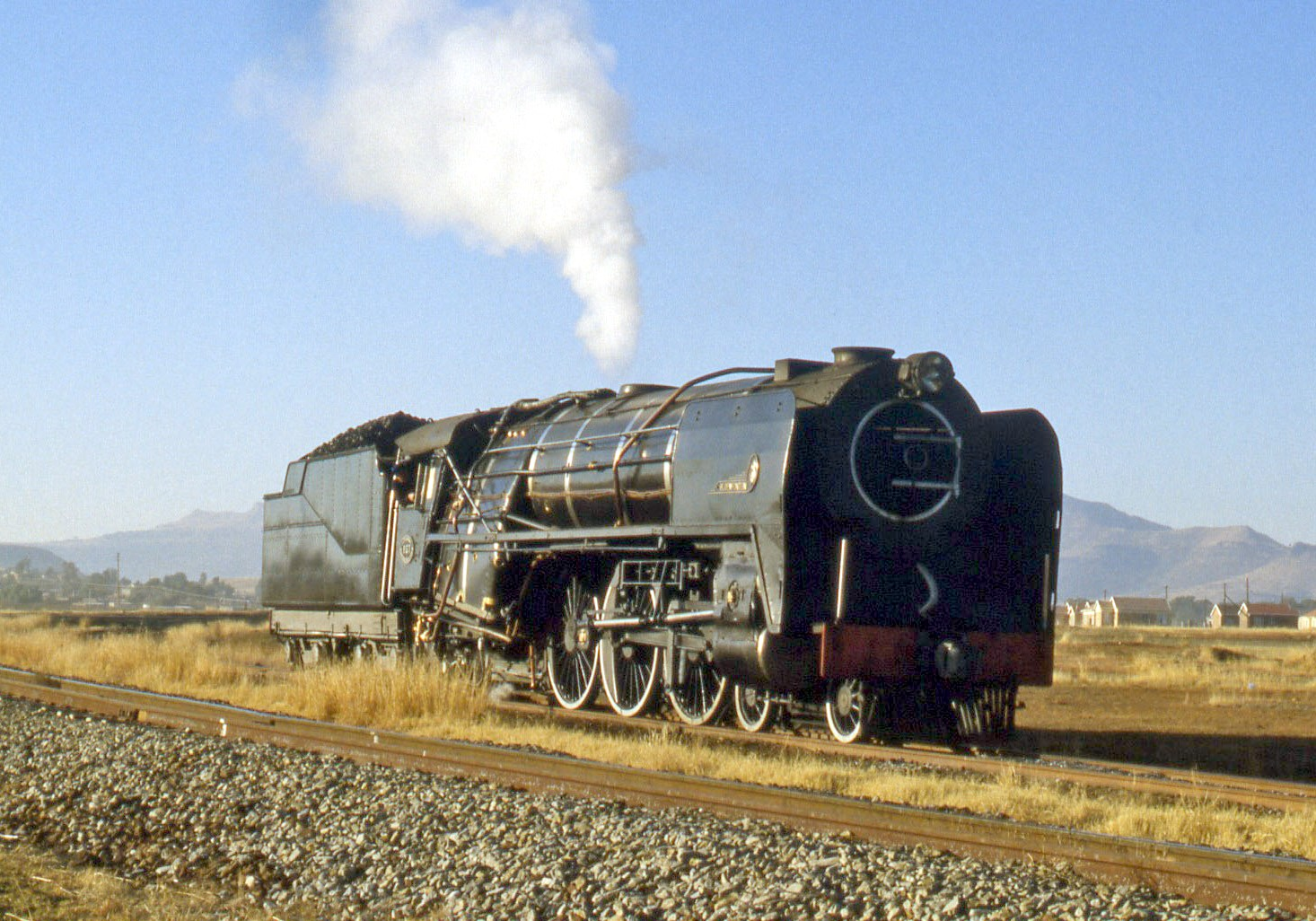
No. 857 with smoke deflectors at Thaba Nchu, 4 July 1999

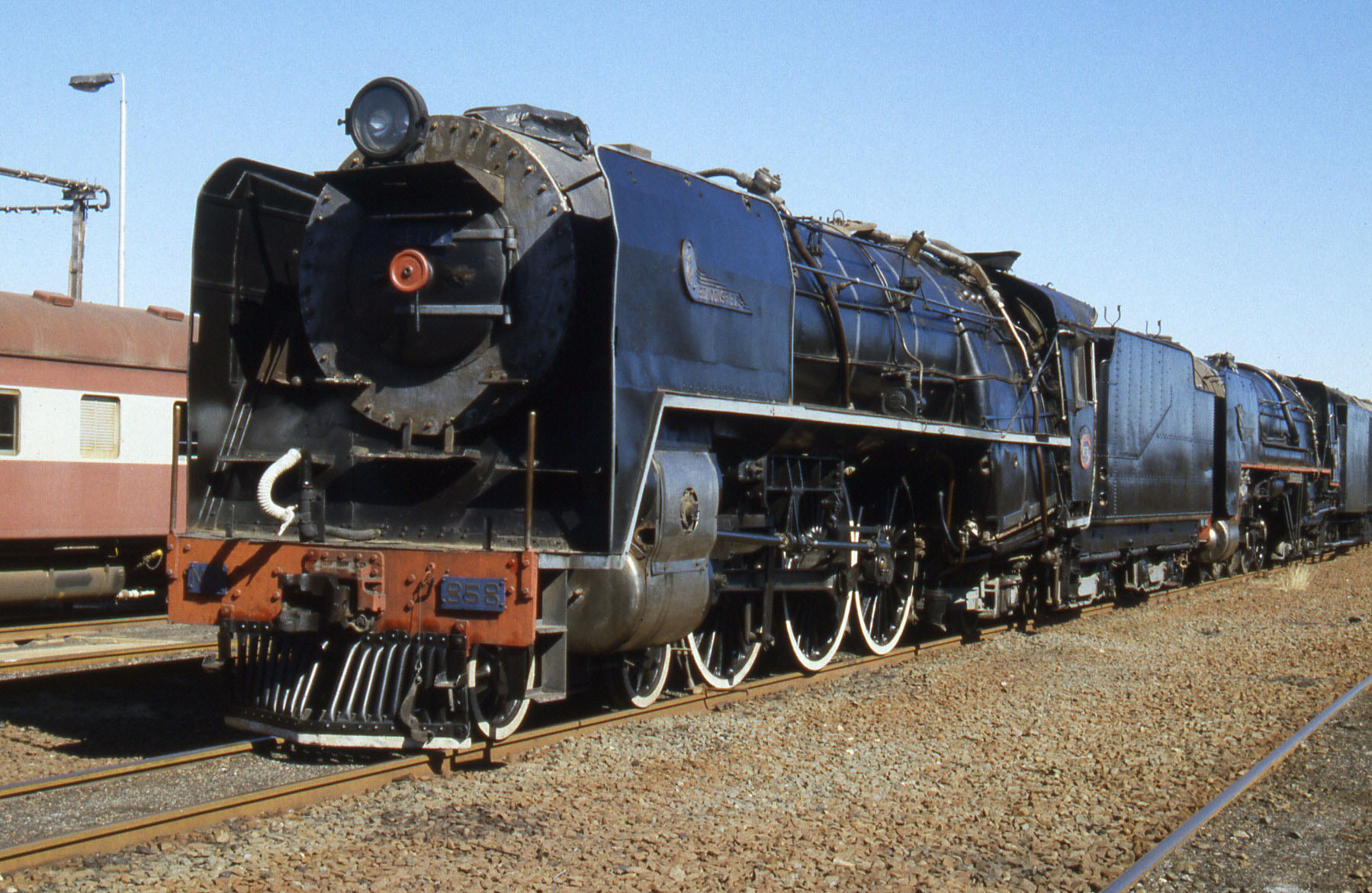
No. 858 with smoke deflectors at Beaconsfield, Kimberley, 3 July 1999
