= South African locomotive numbering and classification =

The Union of South Africa was established on 31 May 1910 in terms of the South Africa Act, which unified the former Cape Colony, Natal Colony and the two colonised former republics, the Transvaal and the Orange Free State. One of the clauses in the Act required that the three Colonial Government railways, the Cape Government Railways, the Natal Government Railways and the Central South African Railways, also be united under one single administration to control and administer the railways, ports and harbours of the Union. While the South African Railways (SAR) came into existence in 1910, the actual classification and renumbering of all the rolling stock of the three constituent railways required careful planning and was only implemented with effect from 1 January 1912.

== Background ==
Each of the component railways of the new South African Railways (SAR) used their own locomotive classification and numbering system. Nearly two years after the establishment of the Union of South Africa, on 1 January 1912, a carefully planned reclassification and renumbering scheme was brought into operation. Most of the locomotives of the Cape Government Railways (CGR), Natal Government Railways (NGR) and Central South African Railways (CSAR) were renumbered into the SAR roster and, with some exceptions, reclassified. Locomotives which retained their old classifications were mostly from the CGR and CSAR, since the SAR more or less followed the CGR's classification system, while the CSAR's was similar to that of the CGR.

== Cape gauge steam locomotives ==
The SAR used different classification systems for its steam locomotives, according to locomotive type. Tender locomotives, shunting locomotives excluded, were classified numerically, while tank, articulated and shunting locomotives were classified using letters of the alphabet. All 3 ft 6 in (1,067 mm) steam locomotives were numbered sequentially, beginning with number 1, but not necessarily in the order of their new 1912 classifications.

=== Tender locomotives ===
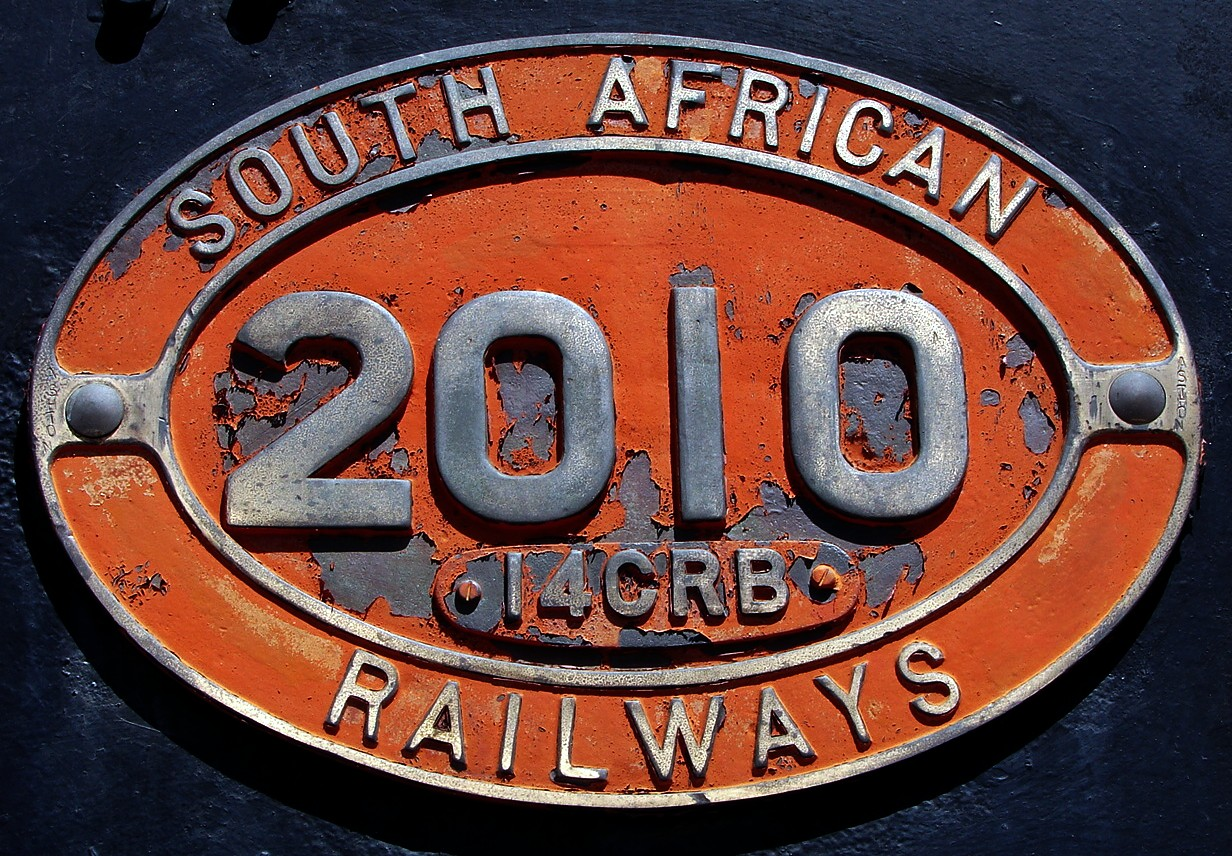
Number plate on Class 14CRB 2010

Tender type steam locomotives, shunting locomotives excluded, were arranged in numerical classes (Classes 1 to 21 and 23 to 26), while variations within classes were indicated by an alphabetical suffix, for example Classes 12, 12A and 12B. Locomotives reboilered with Watson Standard boilers (see below), were reclassified with an additional "R" suffix, for example Classes 12R and 12AR. Some engines were rebalanced to redistribute their axle loadings for either mainline or lighter rail branchline service and were reclassified with an additional "M" (for mainline) or "B" (for branchline) suffix, for example Classes 14CRM and 14CRB.

=== Watson Standard boilers ===
Soon after A.G. Watson was appointment as Chief Mechanical Engineer (CME) of the South African Railways (SAR) in 1929, he set out on a program of standardisation of locomotive boilers and engine parts, which ultimately led to a considerable reduction in the time taken for locomotive repairs. To cut down on maintenance costs, he abandoned the Belpaire firebox altogether and reverted to the round-top type. He was also opposed to the use of combustion chambers. At the time, 88 different types of locomotive were in service, for which some fifty types of replacement boiler were still being ordered prior to 1929. Watson introduced seven standard boilers, later to become known as the Watson Standard boilers. Locomotives which were reboilered with Watson Standard boilers were reclassified with an additional "R" suffix (for reboilered) to their Class numbers.

The first five Watson Standard boilers to be designed were the numbers 1, 1A, 2, 2A and 2B. The no. 1 boiler was suitable for the Classes 5, 5B, 10A, 10B and 10C. The no. 1A boiler was similar to the no. 1, but with the boiler barrel lengthened by 2 feet 5 inches (737 millimetres), and was suitable for the Classes 19, 19A and 19B. The Classes 19C and 19D were built new with no. 1A boilers.

The no. 2 boiler was suitable for the Classes 3, 3B, 4A, 12, 12B, 14, 14A and 14C. The no. 2A boiler was similar to the no. 2, but with the boiler barrel lengthened by 2 feet 4 inches (711 millimetres), and was suitable for the Classes 15, 15A and 15B. The no. 2B boiler was also similar to the no. 2, but with the boiler barrel shortened by 1 foot (305 millimetres), and was suitable for the Classes 16, 16B and 16C.

These were followed by the numbers 3A and 3B boilers. The no. 3A boiler was suitable for the Class 16E, while the no. 3B boiler was 3 feet 5 1/2 inches (1,054 millimetres) longer and suitable for the Classes 15E, 15F, 21 and 23.

Watson Standard boilers - Dimensions and heating surface areas
No.	Inner diameter	Distance between tube plates	Firebox area	Tubes area (total)	Superheater area	Grate area
1	5 ft 0 in 1.52 m	17 ft 9 in 5.41 m	123 sq ft 11.427 m^{2}	1,497 sq ft 139.076 m^{2}	366 sq ft 34.003 m^{2}	36 sq ft 3.345 m^{2}
1A	5 ft 0 in 1.52 m	20 ft 2 in 6.15 m	123 sq ft 11.427 m^{2}	1,700 sq ft 157.935 m^{2}	404 sq ft 37.533 m^{2}	36 sq ft 3.345 m^{2}
2	5 ft 7.5 in 1.71 m	19 ft 4 in 5.89 m	142 sq ft 13.192 m^{2}	1,933 sq ft 179.582 m^{2}	492 sq ft 45.708 m^{2}	37 sq ft 3.437 m^{2}
2A	5 ft 7.5 in 1.71 m	21 ft 8 in 6.60 m	142 sq ft 13.192 m^{2}	2,171 sq ft 201.692 m^{2}	537 sq ft 49.889 m^{2}	37 sq ft 3.437 m^{2}
2B	5 ft 7.5 in 1.71 m	18 ft 4 in 5.59 m	142 sq ft 13.192 m^{2}	1,836 sq ft 170.570 m^{2}	472 sq ft 43.850 m^{2}	37 sq ft 3.437 m^{2}
3A	6 ft 2.25 in 1.89 m	19 ft 0.5 in 5.80 m	206 sq ft 19.138 m^{2}	2,682 sq ft 249.166 m^{2}	592 sq ft 54.999 m^{2}	63 sq ft 5.853 m^{2}
3B	6 ft 2.25 in 1.89 m	22 ft 6 in 6.86 m	206 sq ft 19.138 m^{2}	3,168 sq ft 294.317 m^{2}	676 sq ft 62.802 m^{2}	63 sq ft 5.853 m^{2}

=== Shunting tender locomotives ===
The only purpose-built shunting steam locomotives of the SAR were also tender types and were classed S. Subsequent models became Classes S1 and S2.

=== Tank locomotives ===
Tank locomotives, which carry all their coal and water on the engine itself instead of in a separate tender, were classed alphabetically from Class A to H and J to K, while variations within classes were indicated by a numerical suffix, for example Classes H, H1 and H2.

=== Articulated locomotives ===
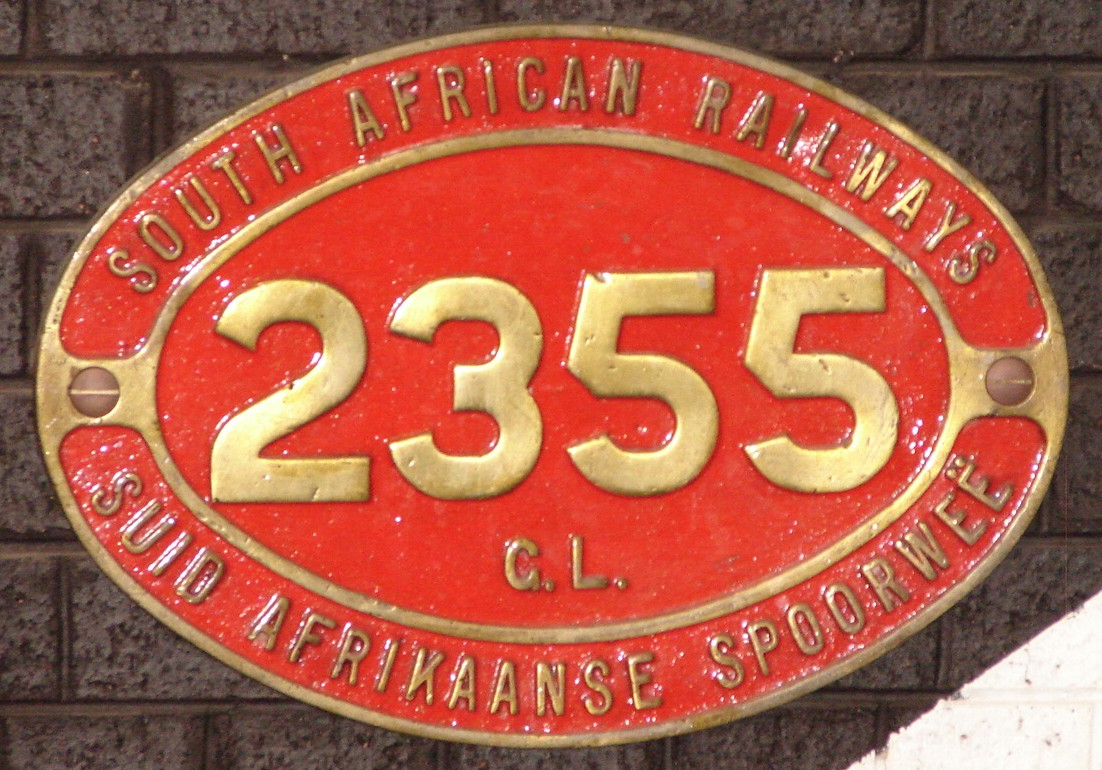
Number plate off Class GL 2355

Mallet locomotives were classed alphabetically, but with an M prefix, from Class MA to MJ, while variations within classes were indicated by a numerical suffix, for example Classes MC and MC1.

Garratt locomotives were also classed alphabetically, but with a G prefix, from Class GA to GO, variations being indicated by an additional letter, as in Classes GCA or GDA. The Class GMA Garratt exists in two forms, the GMA for branchline use and the GMAM for mainline use.

Two of the three Modified Fairlie locomotive types were classed alphabetically, with an F prefix and with the second letters corresponding to the second letter in the equivalent Garratt class, namely the Classes FC and FD. An exception was the third type, the Class HF.

The sole Kitson-Meyer locomotive was classed KM.

The Union-Garratt was a unique locomotive type which can best be described as a hybrid between a Garratt and a Modified Fairlie. Of the two Union-Garratt types, the 2-6-2+2-6-2 was classed U while the 4-6-2+2-6-4 was classed in the Garratt range as Class GH.

=== Obsolete locomotives ===
Ex CGR Classes which were considered obsolete but which were still retained in service when the SAR renumbering came into effect in 1912, were reclassified and renumbered with a numeral 0 prefix to their existing CGR classifications as well as to their existing engine numbers, as in Class 05 no. 0123, while obsolete NGR and CSAR locomotives remained unclassified but with a numeral 0 prefixed to their existing engine numbers. Locomotives taken over from German South West Africa in 1922 retained their original German class descriptions.

== Narrow gauge steam locomotives ==
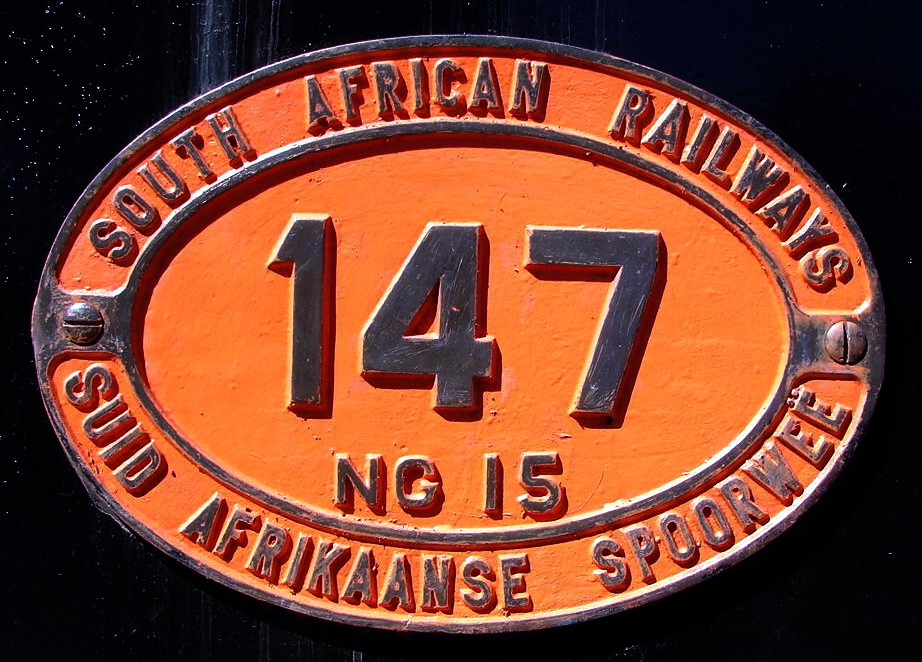
Number plate on Class NG15 147

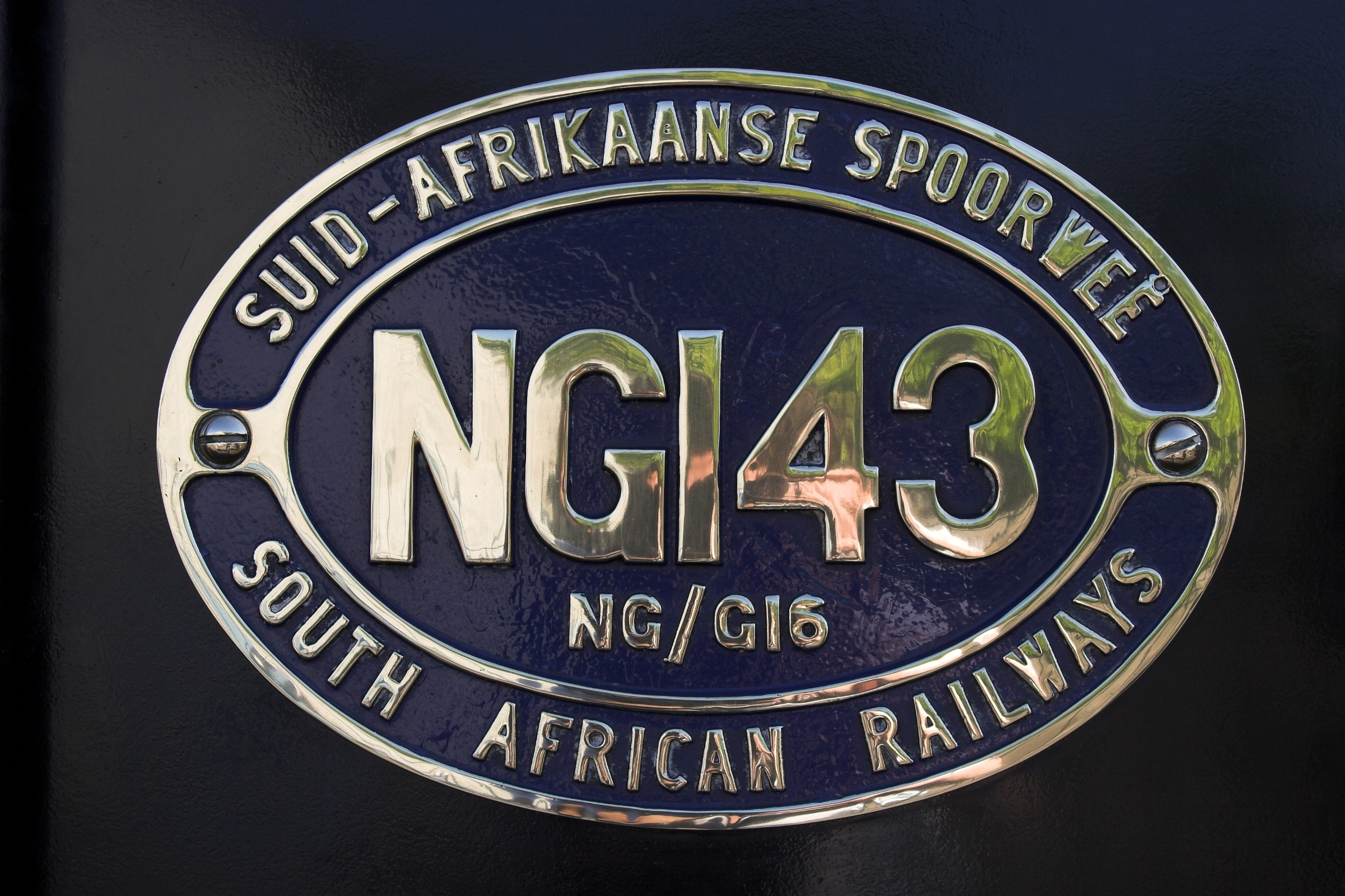
Number plate on Class NG/G16 NG143

Narrow 2 ft (610 mm) and 600 mm (1 ft 11 5/8 in) gauges locomotives were included in the SAR's 1912 numbering scheme and were allocated engine numbers with an "NG" prefix in order to distinguish them from Cape gauge locomotives which shared the same locomotive number, but a system of grouping narrow gauge locomotives into classes was only adopted somewhere between 1928 and 1930. These classifications were also prefixed with "NG", for example "Class NG1" or "Class NG15" for tank or tender locomotives, or "Class NG G16" for Garratts.

The inscriptions on the number plates were not always in a consistent format. On Garratts, for example, the class could be found indicated as "Class NG G16", "Class NG/G16", "Class NGG16" or even simply as "Class NGG". Also, the engine number on the number plate was sometimes prefixed with the "NG", sometimes not.

== Electric and diesel locomotives ==
When the first electric locomotives were commissioned in 1924, they were also numbered sequentially beginning at number 1, more or less in the order of being taken on roster and irrespective of class. To distinguish them from steam locomotives with the same engine number, an "E" prefix was used with their numbers.

Around 1960 the SAR adopted a new classification system for electric and diesel powered locomotives. In terms of the new system, electric locomotives continued to be classed from Class 1E up, with the "E" suffix to distinguish them from steam locomotives with the same class number. Diesel-electric locomotives were classed from Class 31 up, diesel-hydraulic locomotives as Class 61 and narrow gauge diesel-electric locomotives as Class 91.

=== Diesel-electric and diesel-hydraulic locomotives ===
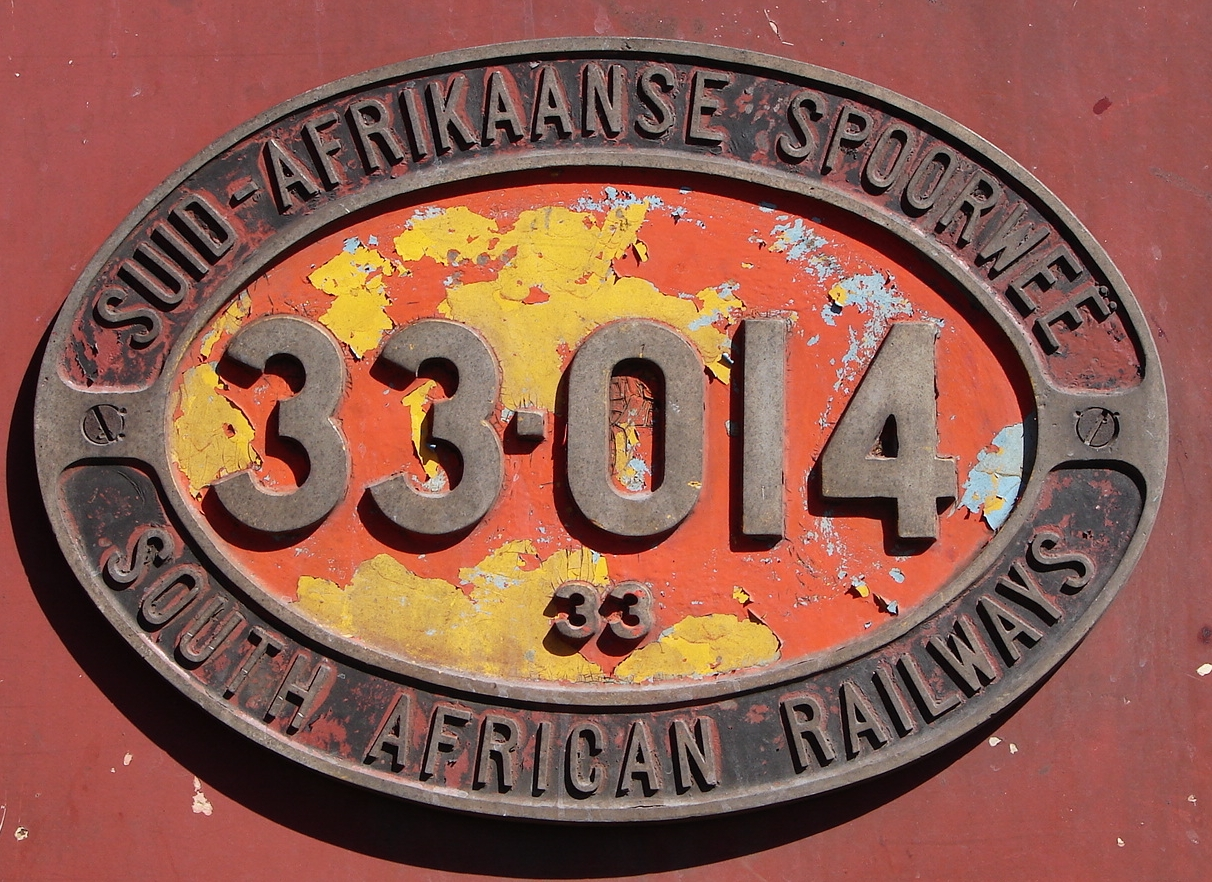
Number plate on Class 33-000 33-014

Diesel-electric and diesel-hydraulic locomotives were distinguished from steam and electric locomotives by having a "D" prefix to their numbers. The first diesel-electric locomotives, two early diesel shunters, were numbered in the same number range as electric locomotives, but with the "D" prefix. These were Class DS no. D137 and Class DS1 no. D138.

Beginning with the arrival of the Class 31 diesel-electric and Class 61 diesel-hydraulic locomotives, the diesels were numbered in their own numbering series with the "D" prefix, overlapping with steam and electric numbers but starting at no. D700. The Class 31 was therefore initially numbered in the range from D700 to D744 and the Class 61 from D745 to D751.

With the implementation of the new classification system for electric and diesel powered locomotives, the numbering system for diesel-electric locomotives was changed to include the locomotive class and series in the locomotive number, for example 32-001 to 32-115 and 32-201 to 32-210. To differentiate between diesel-electric locomotive series within each class while simultaneously indicating the number range of the series, three digits were added to the class number, for example Class 32-000 and Class 32-200. The "D" prefix was done away with.

In the process the early diesels were renumbered. Class 31 numbers D700 to D744 became 31-001 to 31-045 and Class 61 numbers D745 to D751 became 61-001 to 61-007. The Class 61-000 diesel-hydraulics were sold to the Rhodesia Railway shortly thereafter.

=== Electro-diesel locomotives ===
In 1992, when the only South African electro-diesel locomotives to date were taken into service, they were grouped with the diesel-electrics as Class 38-000.

=== Electric locomotives ===
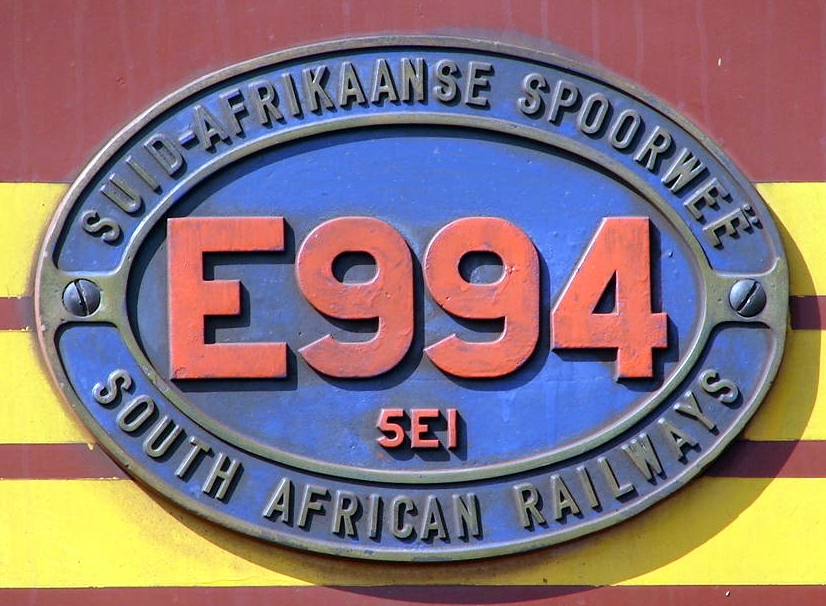
Number plate on Class 5E1 E994

With electric locomotives this new numbering practice was gradually implemented in four stages.

- All electric locomotives, up to and including the Class 6E1s, were still numbered sequentially, irrespective of class, up to no. E2185, the last of the Class 6E1.
- With the introduction of the Class 7E, sequential numbering was done away with and the class number was made part of the locomotive number (E7001 to E7100). Series variations within classes, however, were still sequentially numbered, for example Class 7E1 (E7101 to E7150), Class 7E2, Series 1 (E7151 to E7169) and Class 7E2, Series 2 (E7170 to E7215).
- With the introduction of the Class 10E, the numbering system became partially similar to that of diesel-electric locomotives (10-001 to 10-050). The class series, however, was not yet incorporated into the number, but followed the old practice (10E, 10E1, 10E2). Numbering of such series within the class was still sequential, thus the Class 10E1 was still numbered sequentially following on the last Class 10E number (10-051 to 10-100).
- On electric locomotives the incorporation of the locomotive series into the locomotive number was first used in 1993 with the introduction of the Class 14E1. The three Class 14E locomotives were numbered 14-001 to 14-003 and the Class 14E1 locomotives 14-100 to 14-110, with the "E" prefix done away with. The "E" prefix did resurface in the Transnet Freight Rail (TFR) era, when some Class 10E locomotives were repainted in the red TFR livery.

== Number plates ==
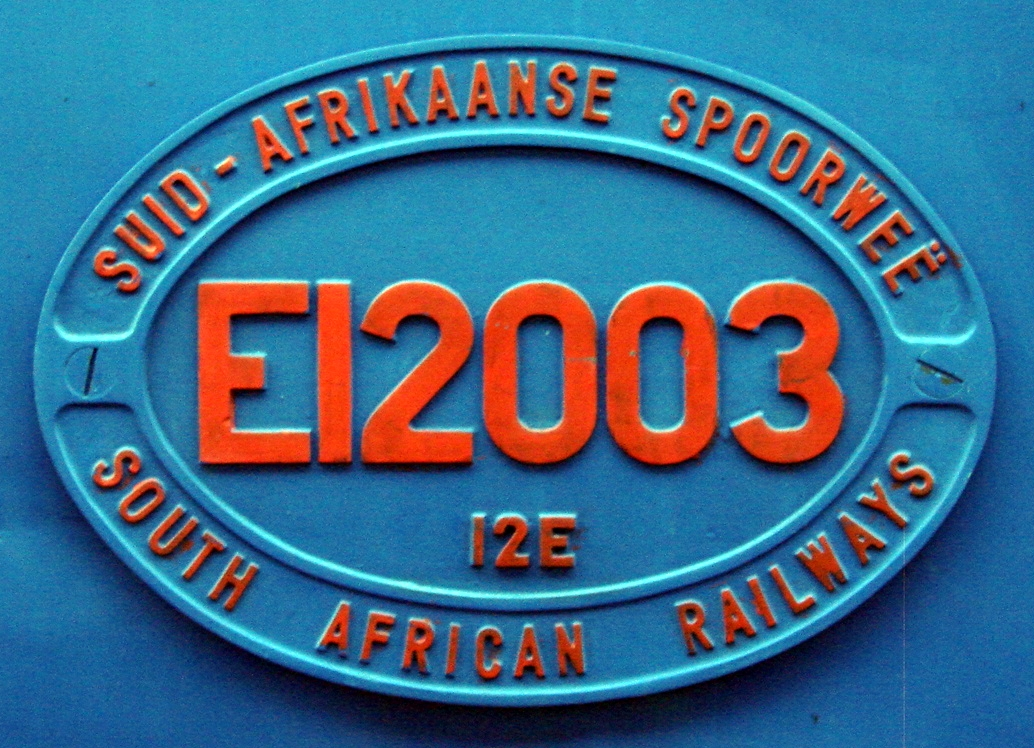
Number plate on Class 12E 12-003

The traditional number plates, on the cab sides of SAR steam and diesel locomotives and in the middle of the sides of electric locomotives, displayed the engine's number and class. They were originally cast in a leaded bronze and were usually kept brightly polished by engine crews. During the SAR era, they were also often unofficially used to display the engine's home depot by the colour of the recessed middle part of the plate.

The number plates date back to the early years of the CGR and NGR and are highly sought after by collectors as well as scrap metal peddlers. Unfortunately, this has led to a rhinoceros horn type situation, where the plates were illegally removed from many locomotives. In later years, in an attempt to discourage theft, most modern engines bore plates which were cast in aluminium instead of leaded bronze.

Eventually, when the SAR became Spoornet in 1990, it was decided to permanently remove these prized items from all electric and diesel-electric locomotives when they were repainted in post-SAR liveries.

Until 1963, the standard dimensions of the SAR plates were 1 foot 6 1/4 inches (464 millimetres) between bolt hole centres, with an overall width of 1 foot 8 3/4 inches (527 mm) and height of 1 foot 2 1/2 inches (368 mm). The standard depth of the plate was 7/16 inch (11 mm), the small lettering recess 1/8 inch (3.2 mm) and the number recess 1/4 inch (6.4 mm), with variations in actual depth depending on how much the plate was dressed or buffed after casting.

A new drawing was produced in 1963, to cover plates for all types of locomotive. While the dimensions remained the same, the height of the portion through which the bolts pass was reduced from 1 3/4 inches (44 mm) to 1 1/2 inches (38 mm). In addition, while earlier plates had English at the top and Afrikaans at the bottom, the new standard stipulated that locomotives should henceforth have two different plates, one with Afrikaans at the top and the other with English at the top.
