= South African Class 15E 4-8-2 =

1935 design of steam locomotive

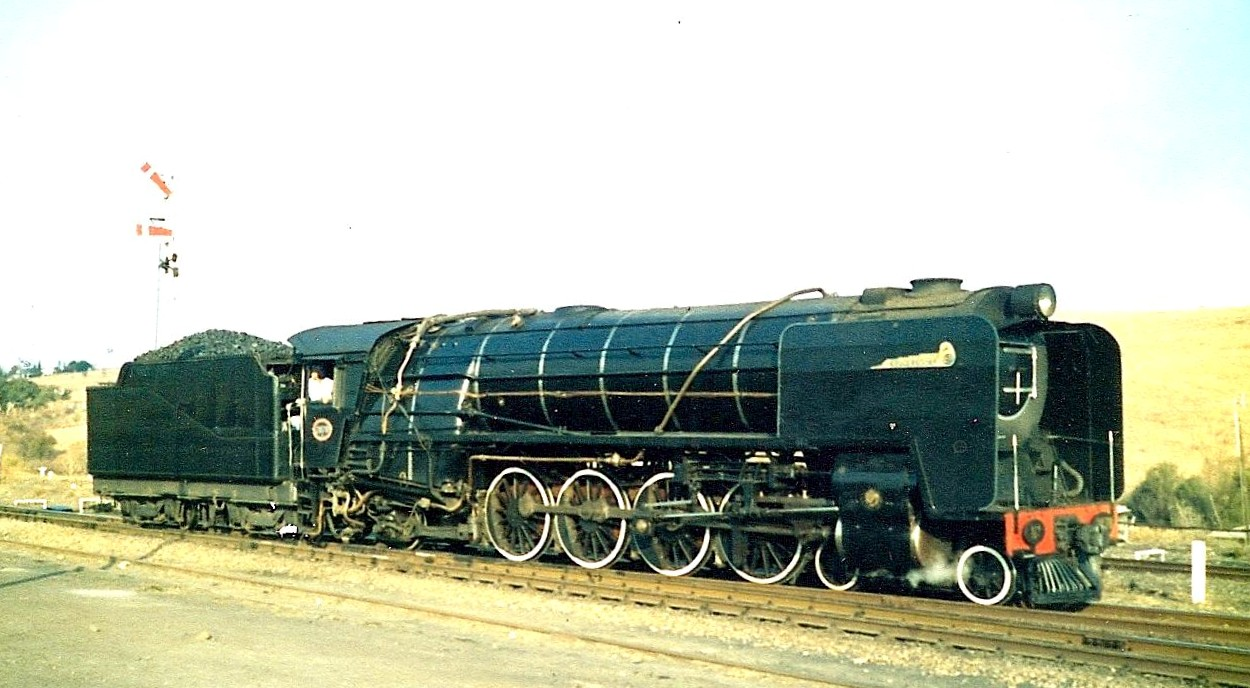
- Henschel-built no. 2878 at Magaliesburg, 26 July 1992
Type and origin
- ♠ Robert Stephenson and Hawthorns engines ♥ Henschel & Berliner engines
- Power type: Steam
- Designer: South African Railways (A.G. Watson)
- Builder: Robert Stephenson & Hawthorns; Henschel and Son; Berliner Maschinenbau
- Serial number: RSH 4090–4109; Henschel 23000-23010, 23111-23115; Berliner 10585-10592
- Model: Class 15E
- Build date: 1935–1936
- Total produced: 44
Specifications
- Configuration
  - Whyte: 4-8-2 (Mountain)
  - UIC: 2'D1'h2
- Driver: 2nd coupled axle
- Gauge: 3 ft 6 in (1,067 mm) Cape gauge
- Leading dia.: 30 in (762 mm)
- Coupled dia.: 60 in (1,524 mm)
- Trailing dia.: 34 in (864 mm)
- Tender wheels: 34 in (864 mm)
- Wheelbase: 65 ft 6 1/4 in (19,971 mm)
  - Engine: 35 ft 8 in (10,871 mm)
  - Leading: 6 ft 10 in (2,083 mm)
  - Coupled: 15 ft 9 in (4,801 mm)
  - Tender: 20 ft 5 in (6,223 mm)
  - Tender bogie: 6 ft 2 in (1,880 mm)
- Length
  - Over couplers: 73 ft 6 in (22,403 mm)
- Height: 12 ft 11 1/2 in (3,950 mm)
- Frame type: Bar
- Axle load: ♠ 18 LT 12 cwt (18,900 kg) ♥ 18 LT 14 cwt (19,000 kg)
  - Leading: ♠ 18 LT 6 cwt (18,590 kg) ♥ 19 LT 5 cwt (19,560 kg)
  - 1st coupled: ♠ 18 LT 3 cwt (18,440 kg) ♥ 17 LT 14 cwt (17,980 kg)
  - 2nd coupled: ♠ 18 LT 12 cwt (18,900 kg) ♥ 18 LT 14 cwt (19,000 kg)
  - 3rd coupled: ♠ 18 LT 10 cwt (18,800 kg) ♥ 18 LT 1 cwt (18,340 kg)
  - 4th coupled: ♠ 18 LT 3 cwt (18,440 kg) ♥ 17 LT 14 cwt (17,980 kg)
  - Trailing: ♠ 17 LT 6 cwt (17,580 kg) ♥ 16 LT 17 cwt (17,120 kg)
  - Tender bogie: Bogie 1: 33 LT 18 cwt (34,440 kg); Bogie 2: 35 LT 10 cwt (36,070 kg)
  - Tender axle: 17 LT 15 cwt (18,030 kg)
- Adhesive weight: ♠ 73 LT 8 cwt (74,580 kg) ♥ 72 LT 3 cwt (73,310 kg)
- Loco weight: ♠ 109 LT (110,700 kg) ♥ 108 LT 5 cwt (110,000 kg)
- Tender weight: 69 LT 8 cwt (70,510 kg)
- Total weight: ♠ 178 LT 8 cwt (181,300 kg) ♥ 177 LT 13 cwt (180,500 kg)
- Tender type: JT (2-axle bogies); JT, JV permitted
- Fuel type: Coal
- Fuel capacity: 14 LT (14.2 t)
- Water cap.: 6,000 imp gal (27,300 L)
- Firebox
  - Type: Round-top
  - Grate area: 63 sq ft (5.9 m^{2})
- Boiler
  - Model: Watson Standard no. 3B
  - Type: Domeless
  - Pitch: 9 ft 2 1/2 in (2,807 mm)
  - Diameter: 6 ft 2 1/4 in (1,886 mm)
  - Tube plates: 22 ft 6 in (6,858 mm)
  - Small tubes: 136: 2 1/2 in (64 mm)
  - Large tubes: 36: 5 1/2 in (140 mm)
- Boiler pressure: 210 psi (1,448 kPa)
- Safety valve: Ross-pop
- Heating surface
  - Firebox: 206 sq ft (19.1 m^{2})
  - Tubes: 3,168 sq ft (294.3 m^{2})
  - Arch tubes: 26 sq ft (2.4 m^{2})
  - Total surface: 3,400 sq ft (320 m^{2})
- Superheater
  - Heating area: 676 sq ft (62.8 m^{2})
- Cylinders: Two
- Cylinder size: 24 in (610 mm) bore 28 in (711 mm) stroke
- Valve gear: Rotary cam
- Valve type: Poppet
- Couplers: AAR knuckle
Performance figures
- Tractive effort: 42,340 lbf (188.3 kN) @ 75%
Career
- Operators: South African Railways; Rhodesia Railways; CF de Mocambique
- Class: Class 15E
- Number in class: 44
- Numbers: 2858-2901
- Nicknames: Bongol
- Delivered: 1935–1937
- First run: 1935
- Withdrawn: 1973

The South African Railways Class 15E 4-8-2 of 1935 was a steam locomotive.

Between 1935 and 1937, the South African Railways placed forty-four Class 15E steam locomotives with a 4-8-2 Mountain type wheel arrangement in service.

== Manufacturers ==
The Class 15E 4-8-2 Mountain type mixed traffic steam locomotive was a refinement of the Classes 15C and 15CA. It was designed by A.G. Watson, Chief Mechanical Engineer (CME) of the South African Railways (SAR) from 1929 to 1936, and incorporated many of the improvements which had been developed by him, some of which were a vastly enlarged standardised boiler, a large and wide fire grate and a Watson cab.

They were built by three manufacturers. In 1935, British locomotive builders Robert Stephenson and Hawthorns (RSH) delivered twenty locomotives, numbered in the range from 2858 to 2877. Henschel and Son of Kassel in Germany built and delivered sixteen in two batches in 1936, numbered in the range from 2878 to 2893. Also in 1936, German locomotive builders Berliner Maschinenbau built another eight locomotives which were delivered in 1937, numbered in the range from 2894 to 2901. The British-built locomotives were 15 long hundredweight (762 kg) heavier than the German-built ones.

== Characteristics ==
The Class 15D classification was never used by the Railways, possibly to have this locomotive's class letter match that of the Class 16E which was delivered in the same year.

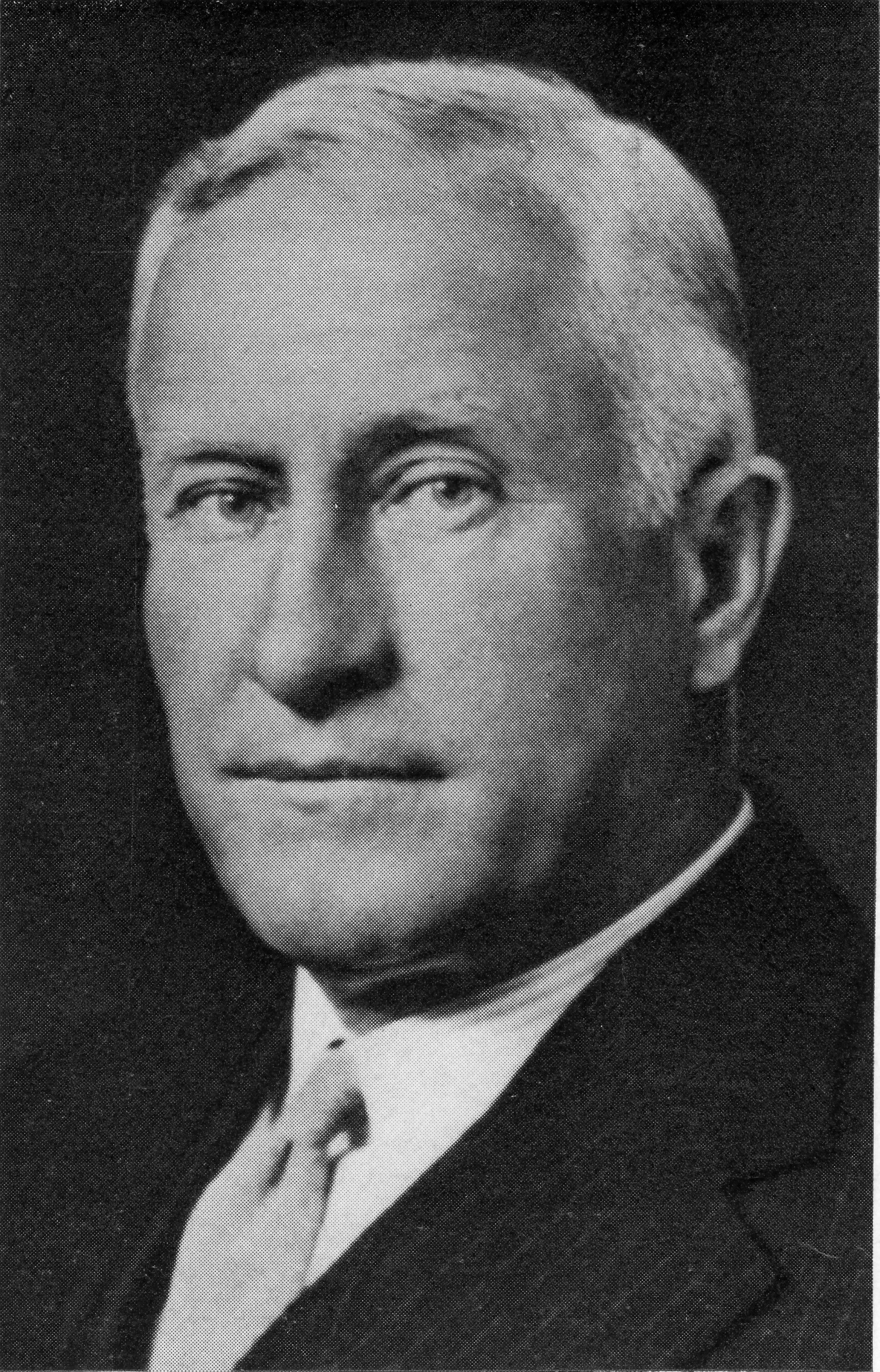
A.G. Watson

Because of the free running that was achieved with the Classes 15E, 16E and 19C which all entered service in 1935 and were all equipped with rotary cam poppet valve gear, Watson decided to adopt this type of valve gear for all his future designs. Most valve gear components of the Class 15E were interchangeable with similar parts of the Class 16E. Like the other classes with poppet valve gear, the Class 15E was fast, but some trouble was initially experienced with the valve gear in the reverse position. This was corrected by modifying the reversing cams and these, as well as new forward cams, were manufactured at the Salt River shops in Cape Town.

The Class 15E, nicknamed Bongol, was delivered with a Watson Standard no. 3B boiler and a Watson cab. In the 1930s, Watson designed a standard boiler type and a cab with an inclined front as part of his standardisation policy. New locomotives which were acquired in the Watson era and later, such as the Class 15E, were built with such boilers and cabs. The boiler pitch was 9 feet 2 1/2 inches (2,807 millimetres) above the top of the rail.

The locomotives were initially equipped with two large inclined Ross-pop safety valves, mounted on the upper sides of the boiler just ahead of the firebox and aimed about 80 degrees apart. When these inclined valves blew off under a station canopy, bystanders often received a shower of slimy wet soot. After the war, they were replaced by smaller Ross-pop valves at the highest point of the boiler that blew off straight up.

Some of the locomotives that worked on sections with tunnels were equipped with smoke deflecting cowls around their chimneys.

The 24 inches (610 millimetres) bore by 28 inches (711 millimetres) stroke cylinders were interchangeable with those of the Class 16E. A 4 1/2 inches (114 millimetres) thick cast-iron liner was fitted between the smokebox and its saddle to obtain this interchangeability. The cylinders had cast-iron liners and the steam and exhaust valve seatings were renewable. The connecting and coupling rods were fitted with floating bronze bushes and all crank pins were hollow bored. Soft grease lubrication was used for the motion, while the coupled wheel axle boxes were hard grease lubricated.

The buffing gear between engine and tender consisted of a laminated spring, contained in a steel casting attached to the tender's front buffer beam. The tender was the Type JT which was first introduced in 1935 along with the Class 15E Mountain type and Class 16E Pacific type. The tender had a coal capacity of 14 long tons (14.2 tonnes), a water capacity of 6,000 imperial gallons (27,300 litres) and an axle load of 17 long tons 15 hundredweight (18,030 kilograms).

== Service ==
=== South African Railways ===
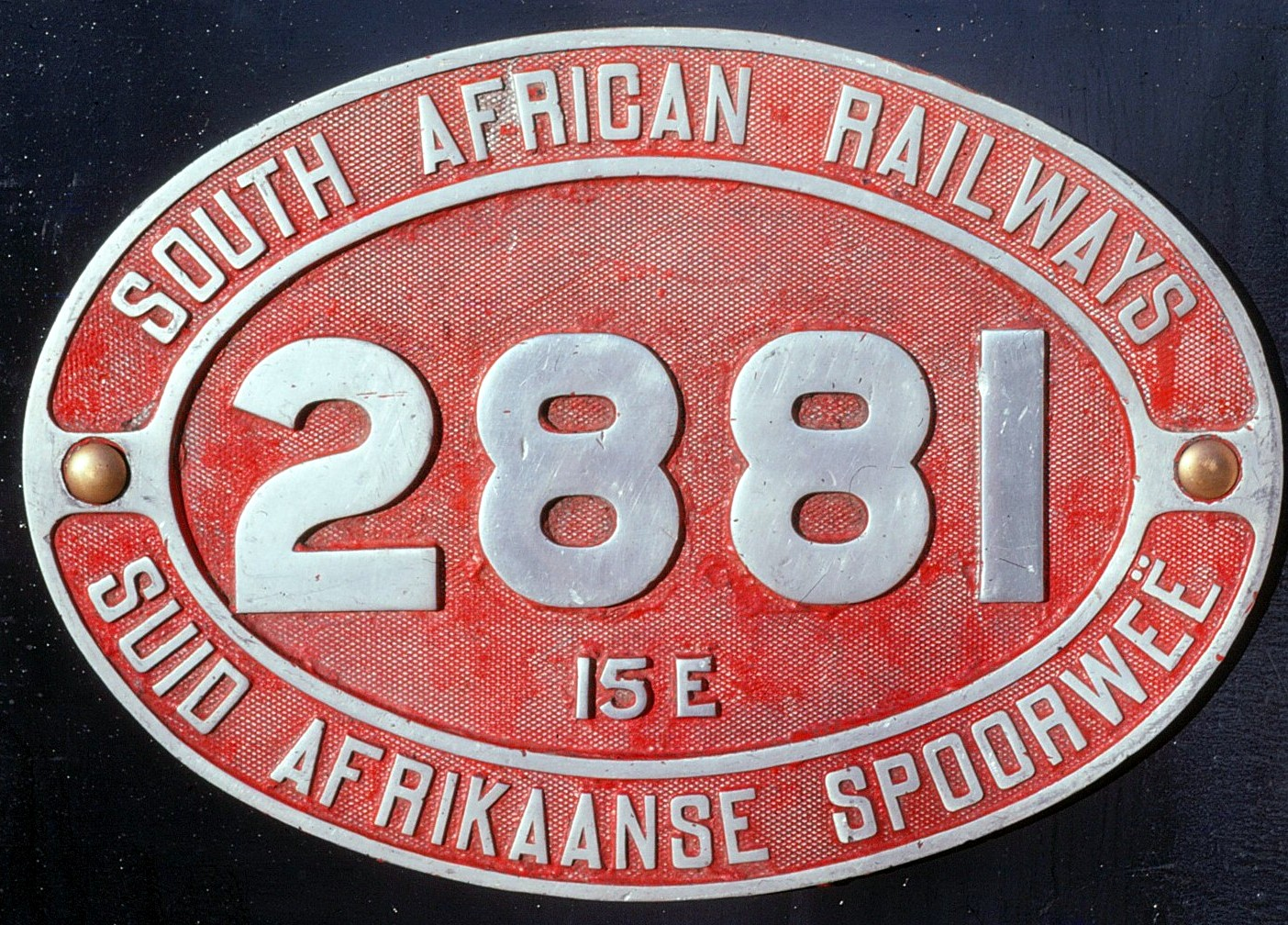

The Class 15E was placed in service on the mainline between Cape Town and Beaufort West. Later, when the Classes 15F and 23 were placed in service, the Class 15E locomotives were relocated further north to work between Beaufort West and De Aar. During 1954–1955, upon the arrival of the Class 25 condensers and Class 25NC, they were displaced from the Cape mainline and all 44 Bongols were relocated, this time to Bloemfontein.

In the 1960s they went to Bethlehem in the Orange Free State, from where they worked to Harrismith, Bloemfontein and Kroonstad. They were all withdrawn from regular service in 1973, except no. 2878 which was retained in running order for excursion trains.

=== Other operators ===
Eleven of the Class 15E locomotives were eventually sold to neighbouring countries or into industrial service. Six of them were sold to Rhodesia Railways (RR) in 1970, where they retained their 15E classification but were renumbered by omitting the first digit of their SAR numbers. In Rhodesia they were stationed only at Bulawayo, and used virtually exclusively on trains to and from Gwelo. The Rhodesian locomotives did not last long in RR service, however, and were scrapped in 1973.

Three locomotives were sold to Caminhos de Ferro de Mocambique (CFM) in 1972, where they were renumbered 721, 722 and 723 respectively.

Two locomotives were sold to Dunn's Locomotive Works, to be employed at Durban Navigation Collieries (Durnacol) at Dannhauser in Natal.

The table shows the Class 15E engine numbers, builders, years built, works numbers and post-SAR owners.

Class 15E 4-8-2 Builders, Works Numbers & Disposal
SAR No.	Builder	Year	Works No.	Sold to	New No.
2858	RSH	1935	4090		
2859	RSH	1935	4091		
2860	RSH	1935	4092		
2861	RSH	1935	4093		
2862	RSH	1935	4094		
2863	RSH	1935	4095		
2864	RSH	1935	4096		
2865	RSH	1935	4097		
2866	RSH	1935	4098		
2867	RSH	1935	4099		
2868	RSH	1935	4100		
2869	RSH	1935	4101		
2870	RSH	1935	4102	CFM	721
2871	RSH	1935	4103		
2872	RSH	1935	4104	Dunn	
2873	RSH	1935	4105		
2874	RSH	1935	4106		
2875	RSH	1935	4107		
2876	RSH	1935	4108		
2877	RSH	1935	4109		
2878	Henschel	1936	23000		
2879	Henschel	1936	23001		
2880	Henschel	1936	23002		
2881	Henschel	1936	23003	RR	881
2882	Henschel	1936	23004	RR	882
2883	Henschel	1936	23005	RR	883
2884	Henschel	1936	23006		
2885	Henschel	1936	23007	RR	885
2886	Henschel	1936	23008	RR	886
2887	Henschel	1936	23009		
2888	Henschel	1936	23010		
2889	Henschel	1936	23111		
2890	Henschel	1936	23112		
2891	Henschel	1936	23113	CFM	722
2892	Henschel	1936	23114		
2893	Henschel	1936	23115		
2894	Berliner	1936	10585	CFM	723
2895	Berliner	1936	10586	Dunn	
2896	Berliner	1936	10587		
2897	Berliner	1936	10588		
2898	Berliner	1936	10589	RR	898
2899	Berliner	1936	10590		
2900	Berliner	1936	10591		
2901	Berliner	1936	10592		

== Preservation ==
Number	Works nmr	THF / Private	Leaselend / Owner	Current Location	Outside South Africa	?
2878	HENSC 23000	THF		Bloemfontein Locomotive Depot		

== Illustration ==
The main picture shows preserved Henschel-built no. 2878 with elephant ear smoke deflectors at Magaliesburg, Transvaal, on 26 July 1992, while the following pictures illustrate some differences in appearance over the years.

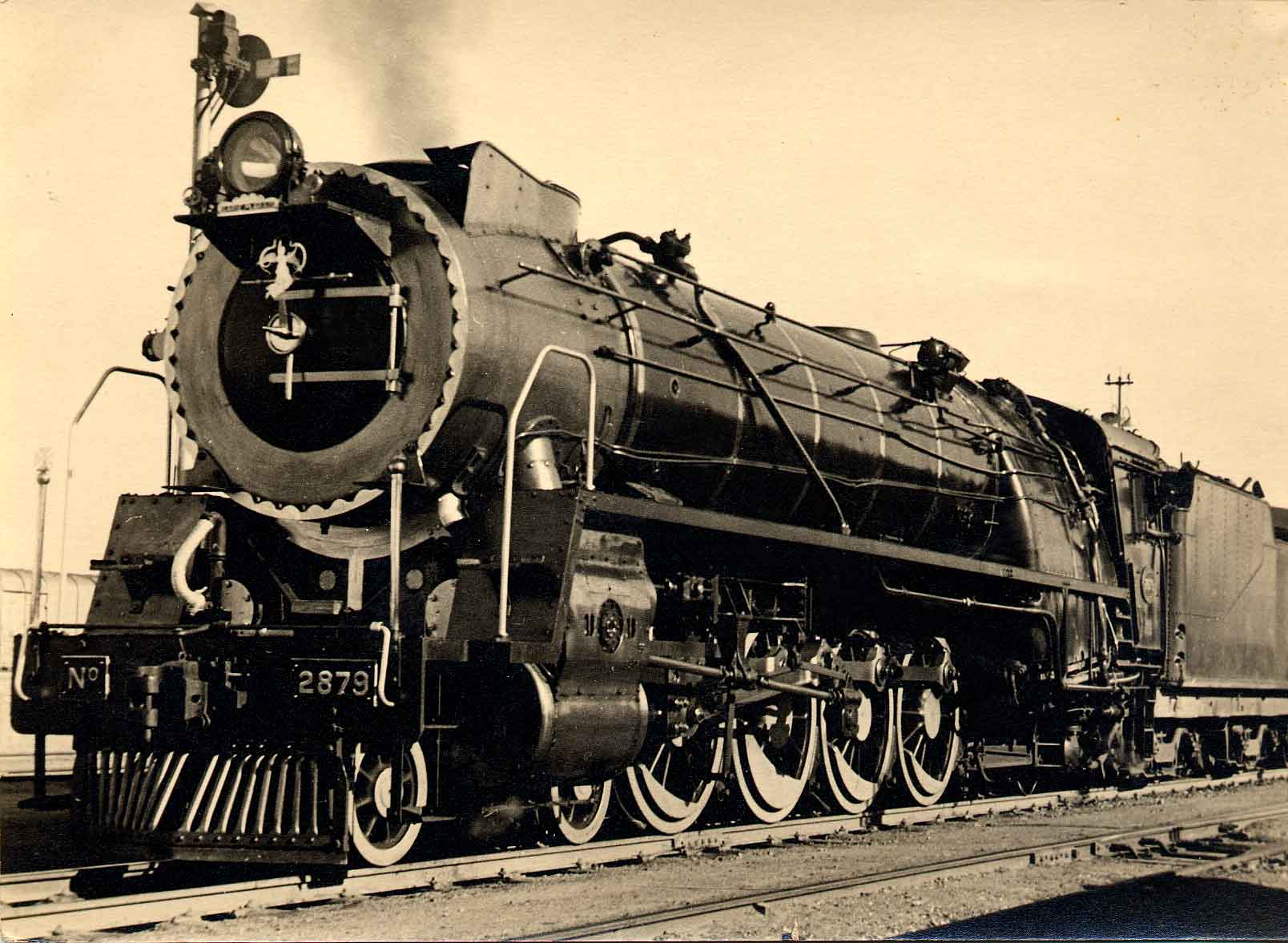
Henschel-built no. 2879 with smoke deflecting cowl, c. 1940

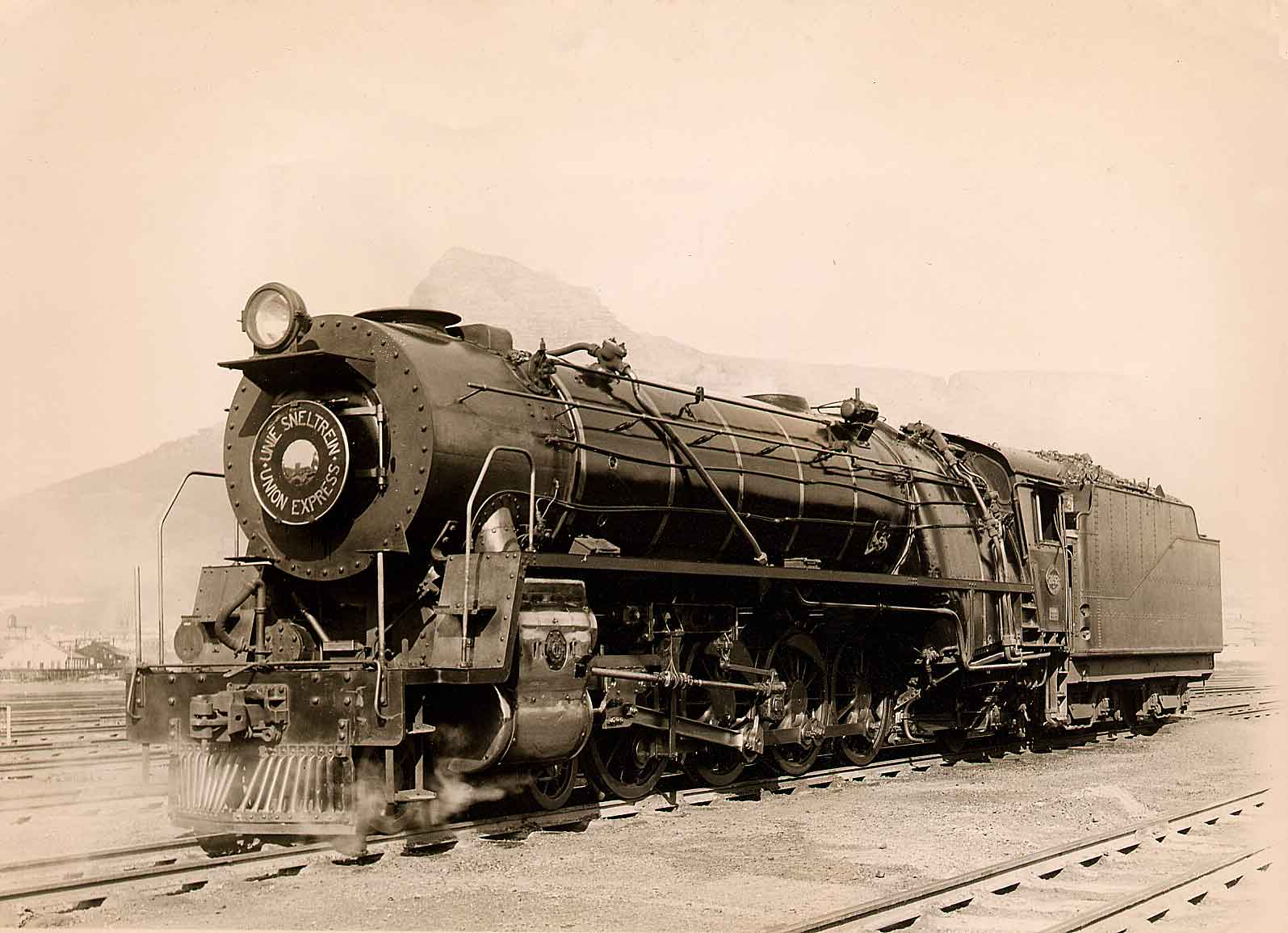
Berliner-built no. 2897 at Paardeneiland, Cape Town, c. 1940

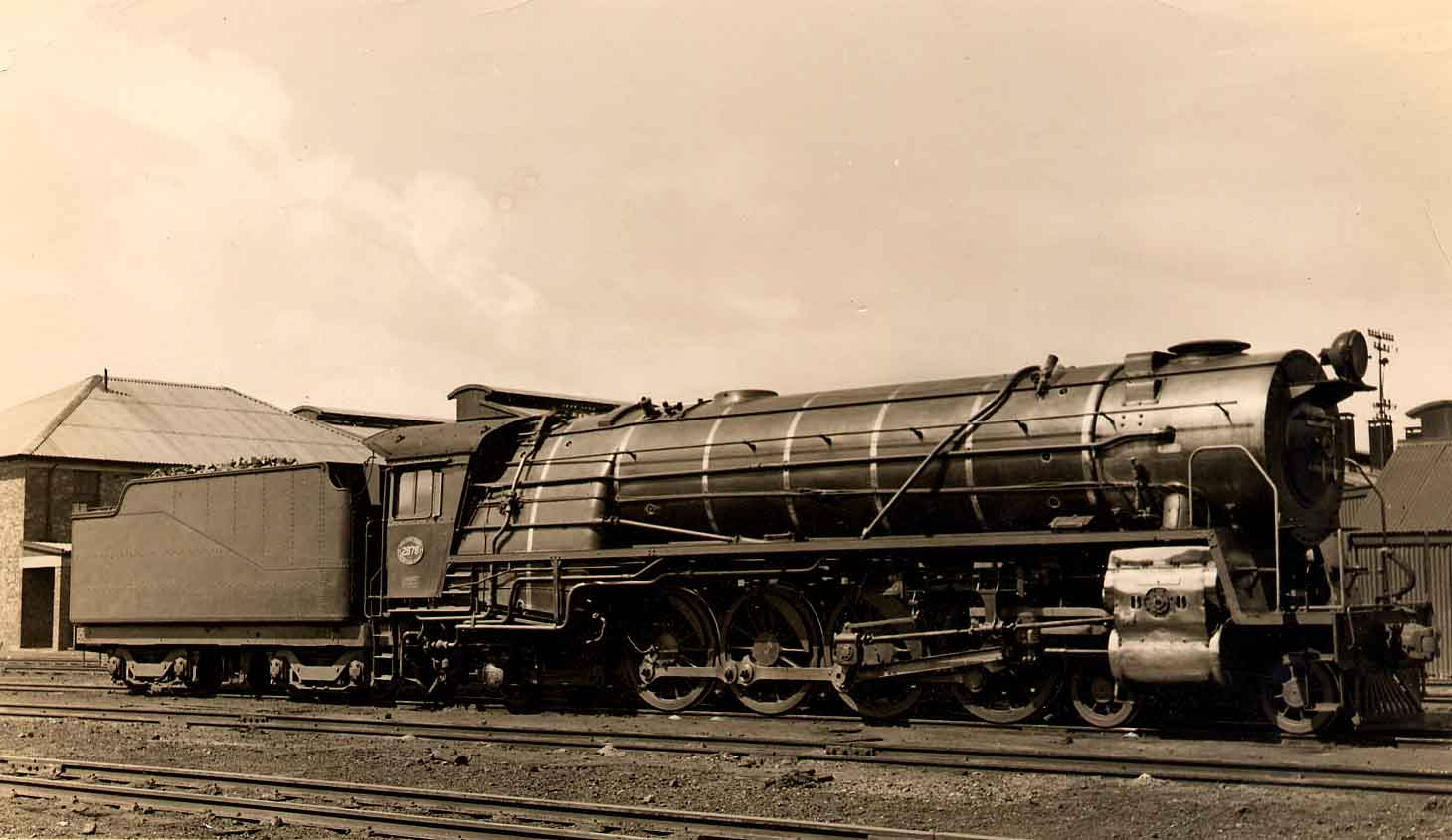
Henschel-built no. 2878 at Paardeneiland, Cape Town, c. 1940

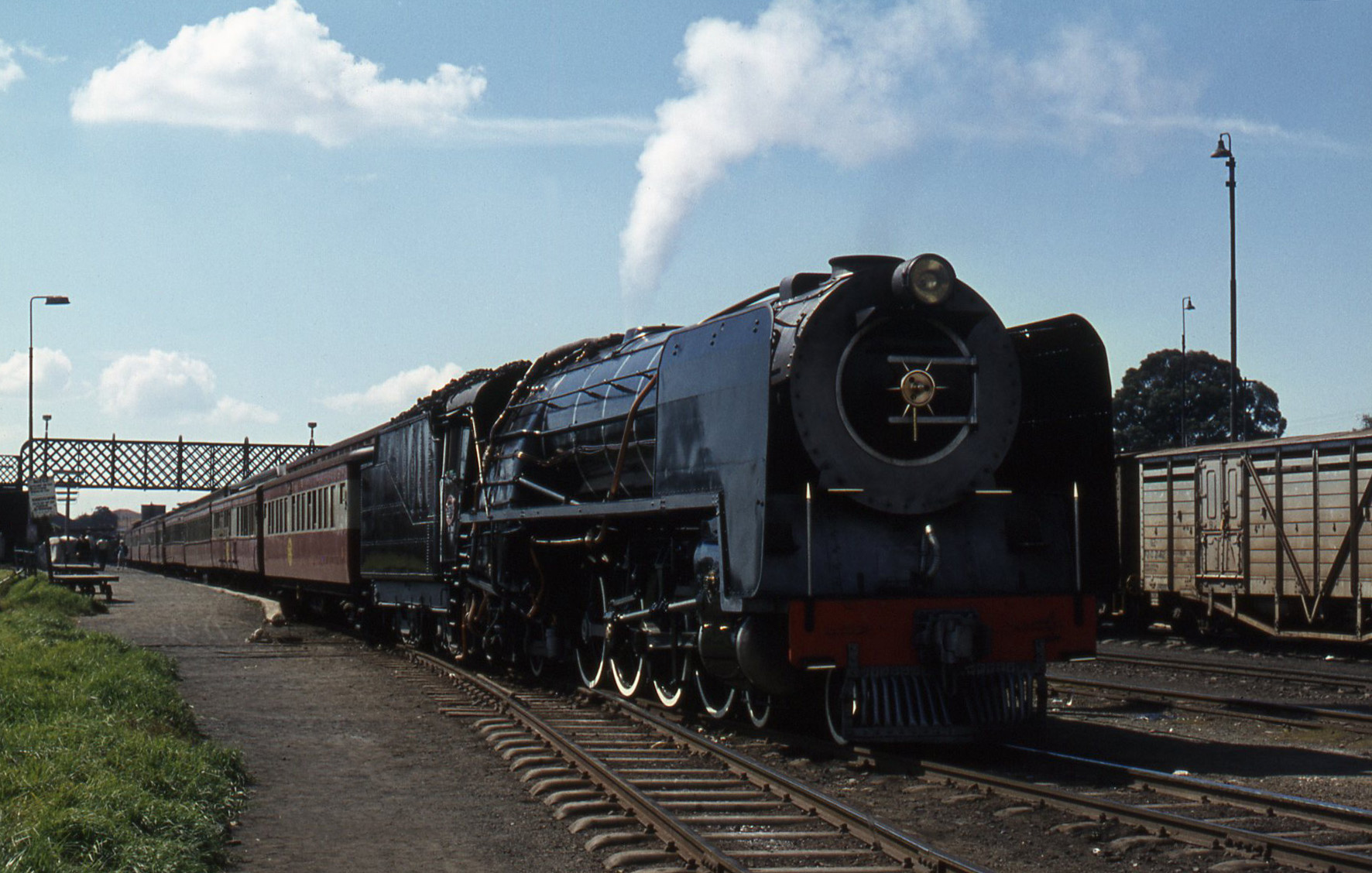
Henschel-built no. 2878 at Breyten, 26 April 1981
