= Allan Griffiths Watson =

South African engineer (1876–1945)

A. G. Watson
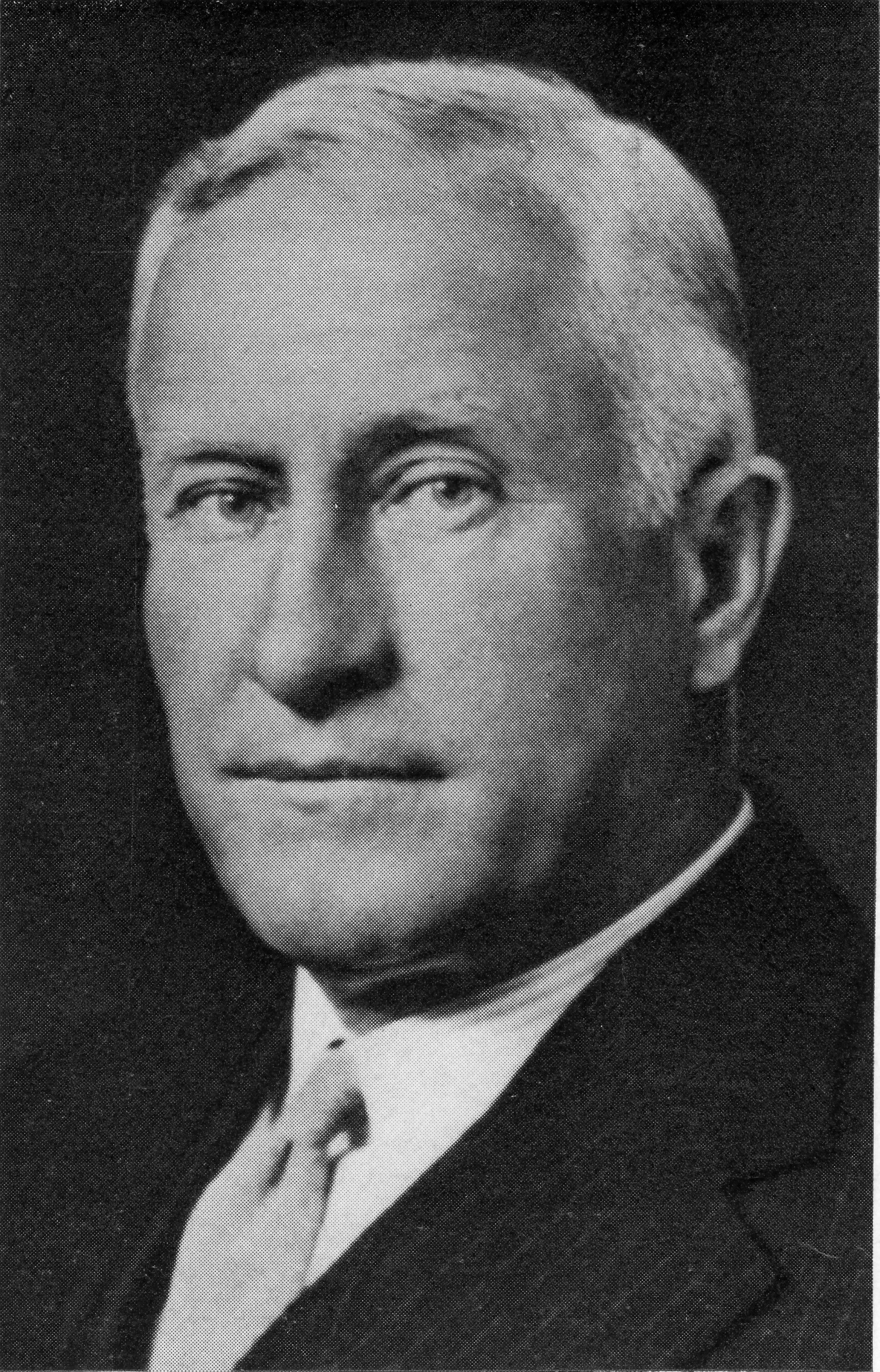
- Born: 1876; Hopetown, Cape Province
- Died: 13 November 1945 (aged 68–69); Cape Town
- Engineering career
- Discipline: Mechanical / Locomotive
- Employers: Neilson, Reid & Co.; Cape Government Railways; South African Railways and Harbours Administration
- Significant design: Watson standard boilers

Allan Griffiths Watson (1876–1945) was South African Railways (SAR) Chief Mechanical Engineer (1929-1936).

Watson was born in 1876 in Hopetown, Cape Colony. He received his early education in Cape Colony. He moved to Scotland in 1895 to work for Neilson, Reid and Company at their Hyde Park Works; returning five years later to work for the Cape Government Railways. He rose up through various positions in the CGR and its successor, the South African Railways and Harbours Administration, until he was appointed to succeed Lieut-Col. F. R. Collins as Chief Mechanical Engineer as of 1 April 1929.

Soon after Watson was appointment as Chief Mechanical Engineer, he set out on a program of standardisation of locomotive boilers and engine parts, which ultimately led to a considerable reduction in the time taken for locomotive repairs. At the time, 88 different types of locomotive were in service on the South African Railways, for which some fifty types of replacement boiler were still being ordered prior to 1929.

He was responsible for many innovations and improvements to SAR locomotives. He raised the boiler pitch from 8 feet 6 inches (2,591 millimetres) to 9 feet 2 1/2 inches (2,807 millimetres) in one swoop, whereas it had been increased from 7 feet (2,134 millimetres) to 8 feet 6 inches (2,591 millimetres) by increments of 1 inch (25 millimetres) or so at a time during the previous thirty years. He introduced his own design of flexible side and roof firebox stays with rocking washers, which proved to be resistant to the build-up of scale which gradually rendered conventional types of stay rigid and inflexible.

He retired in 1936, and died in Cape Town on 13 November 1945.

Business positions
Preceded by Lieut-Col. Francis Richard Collins, DSO	Chief Mechanical Engineer of the South African Railways; 1929–1936	Succeeded by W. A. J. Day
