= 2-10-4 =

Locomotive wheel arrangement

2-10-4 Texas/Selkirk
- Front of locomotive at left

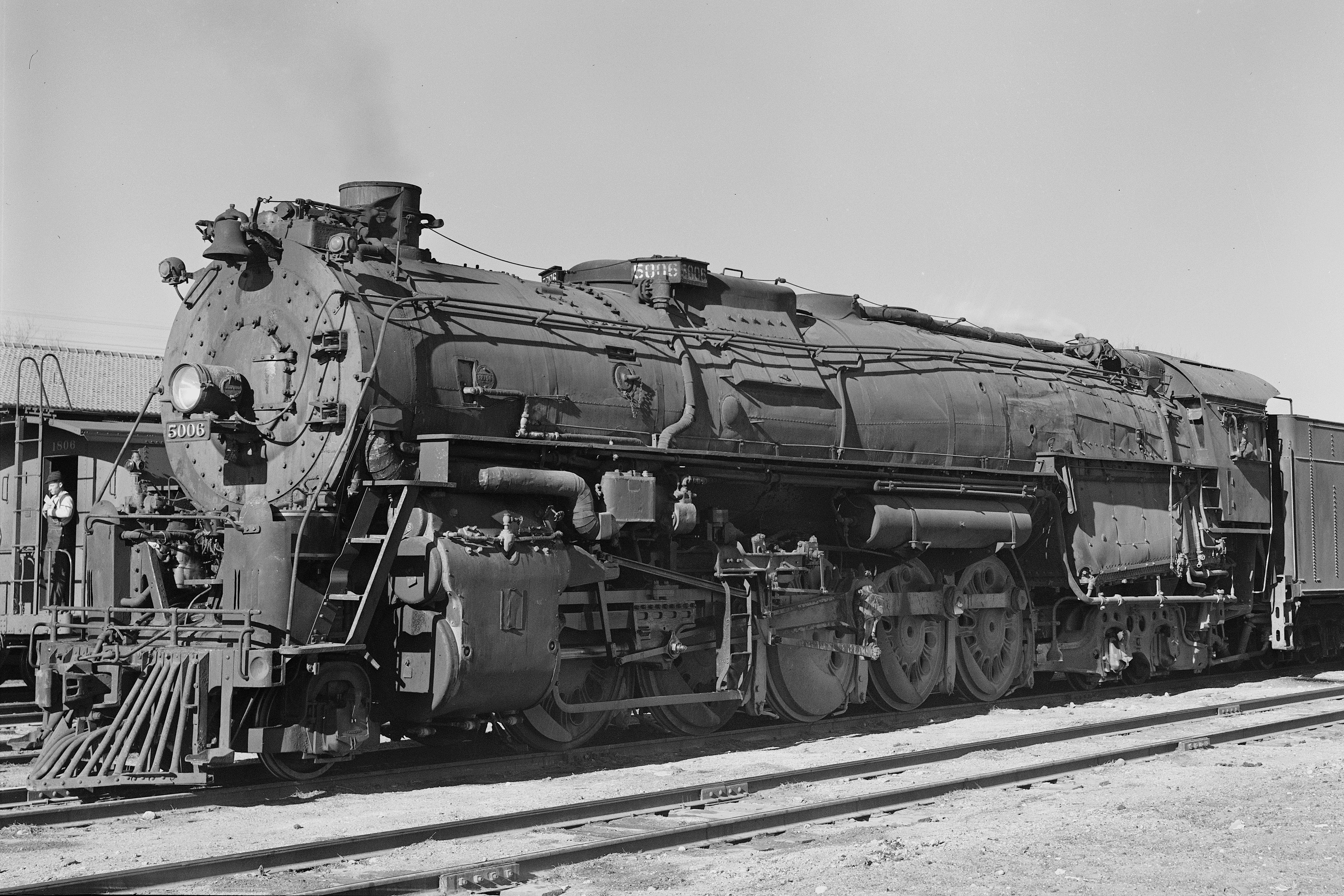
- ATSF 5001 Class Texas type
Equivalent classifications
- UIC class: 1E2, 1′E2′
- French class: 152
- Turkish class: 58
- Swiss class: 5/8
- Russian class: 1-5-2
First known tank engine version
- First use: 1903
- Country: Philippines
- Locomotive: No. 4818 "Luneta"
- Railway: Naga Sugar Central
- Designer: H.K Porter Inc.
- Builder: H.K Porter Inc.
- Evolved from: 2-6-4T
- Benefits: More power
- Drawbacks: Less manouverability
First known tender engine version
- First use: 1919
- Country: United States
- Locomotive: No. 3829
- Railway: Atchison, Topeka and Santa Fe Railway
- Designer: Baldwin Locomotive Works
- Builder: Baldwin Locomotive Works
- Evolved from: 2-10-2, 2-8-4
- Benefits: Larger firebox than 2-10-2, more power than 2-8-4
- Drawbacks: Less speed from small drivers
First known "True type" version
- First use: 1925
- Country: United States
- Locomotive: T&P Class I-1
- Railway: Texas and Pacific Railway
- Designer: William E Woodard
- Builder: Lima Locomotive Works
- Benefits: bigger and deeper firebox than 2-10-2

Under the Whyte notation for the classification of steam locomotives, a 2-10-4 represents the wheel arrangement of two leading wheels, ten powered and coupled driving wheels, and four trailing wheels. Typically using a Bissel truck in front, these were referred to as the Texas type in most of the United States, the Colorado type on the Burlington Route, and the Selkirk type in Canada.

== Overview ==
The 2-10-4 Texas wheel arrangement originated and was principally used in the United States. The evolution of this locomotive type began as a 2-10-2 Santa Fe type with a larger four-wheeled trailing truck that would allow an enlarged firebox. A subsequent development was as an elongated 2-8-4 Berkshire type that required extra driving wheels to remain within axle load limits. Examples of both of these evolutionary progressions can be found.

Some 2-10-4 tank locomotives also existed in eastern Europe. One extraordinary experimental 2-10-4 tender locomotive, built in the Soviet Union, had an opposed-piston drive system.

== Usage ==
=== Belgian Congo ===
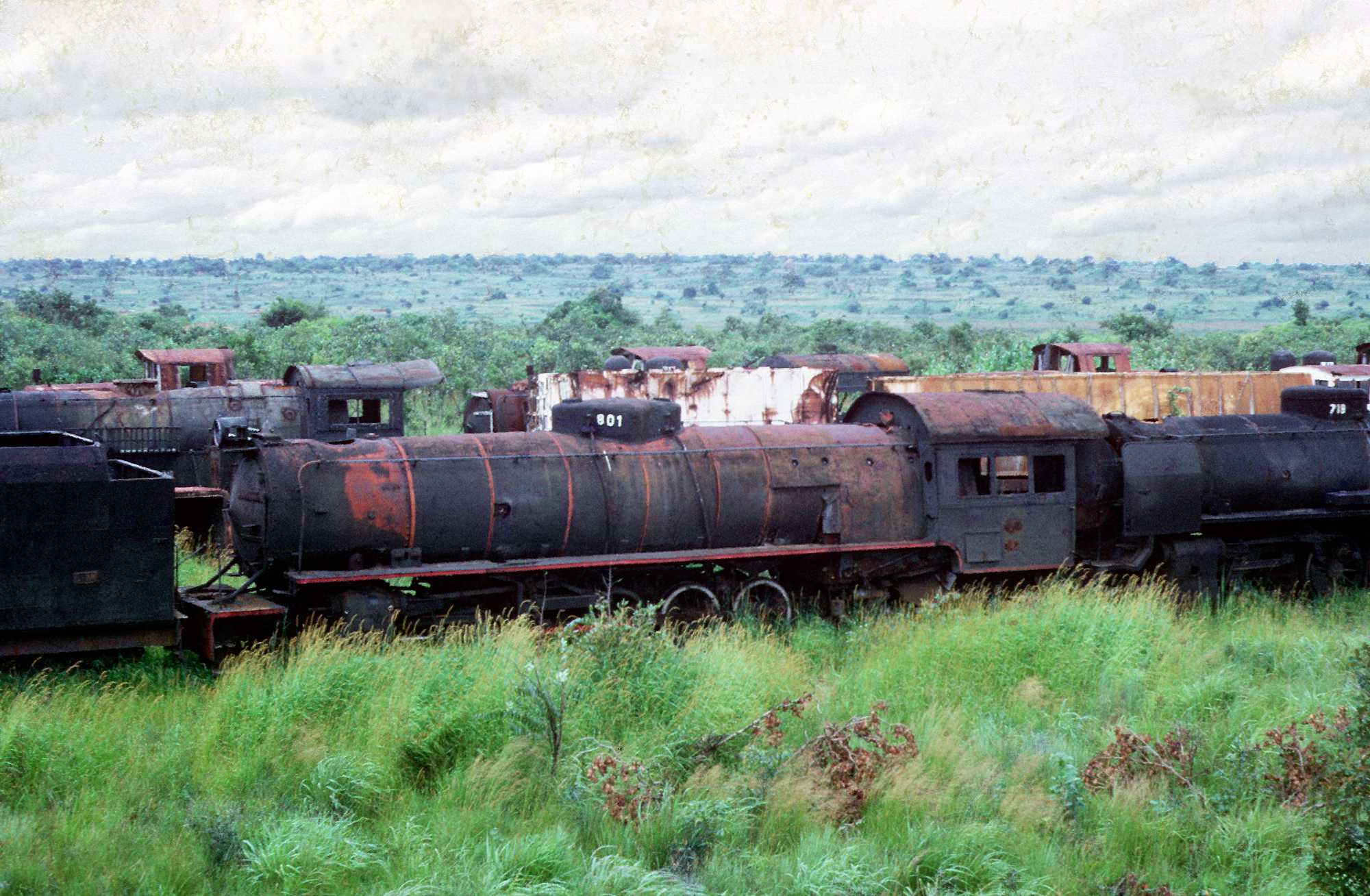
No. 801 dumped at Lubumbashi in the Democratic Republic of the Congo

The Texas type was rare in Africa. One locomotive, numbered 801, was built for the CF du Bas-Congo au Katanga by Société Anonyme John Cockerill in 1939. It had 540 by 550 mm (21 by 22 in) cylinders and 1,100 mm (43 in) diameter driving wheels, with a working order mass of 107.8 t (106.1 long tons; 118.8 short tons), a grate area of 5.4 m^{2} (58 sq ft), and a tractive effort at 65% boiler pressure of 14,690 kgf (144,100 N; 32,400 lbf). The locomotive is believed to have been built for the line between Bukama and Kamina and accumulated 1,200,000 km (750,000 mi) during its service lifetime. Even with its large size, it was hand-fired and had two firebox doors, with two firemen being carried.

=== Brazil ===
Outside North America, the 2-10-4 was rare. In South America, the Central Railway of Brazil ordered 17 1,000 mm (3 ft 3 3/8 in) metre gauge 2-10-4 locomotives, 10 from Baldwin, which were delivered in 1940, and another seven from the American Locomotive Company, which were delivered in 1947.

=== Canada ===
The Canadian Pacific (CP) Selkirk locomotives were all built by Montreal Locomotive Works (MLW). The first 20 of these large engines were built in 1929, designated T1a class and allocated numbers 5900 to 5919. Their Canadian type name was after the Selkirk Mountains across which they were placed in service, the railway summit of which was located just inside the western portal of the Connaught Tunnel beneath Rogers Pass.

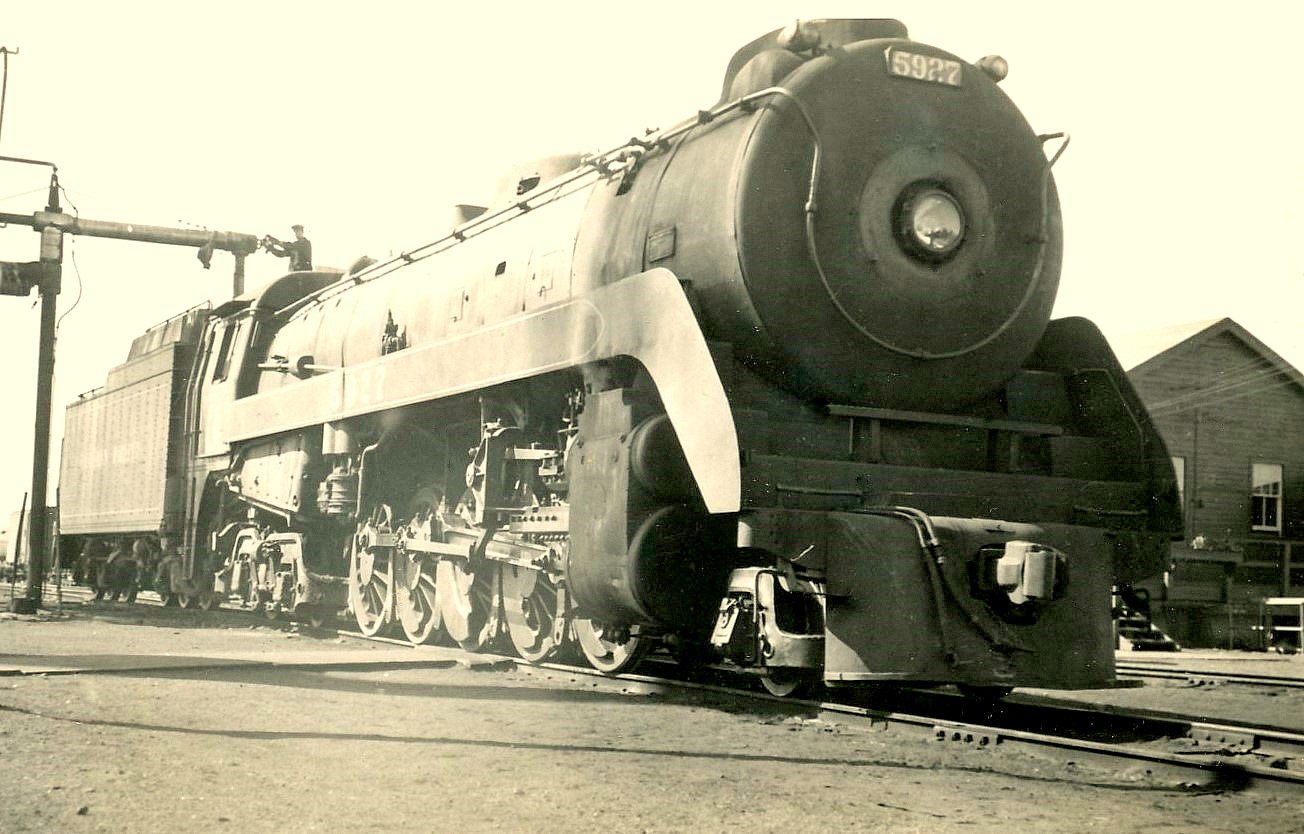
Canadian Pacific T1c, 1957

MLW built another 10 of these successful locomotives for CP during November and December 1938, designated T1b class and numbered from 5920 to 5929. Modifications to the original design led to the T1b being 10 tonnes lighter while its operating steam pressure was increased from 275 to 285 psi (1,900 to 1,970 kPa).

A further six Selkirks, classed T1c and numbered from 5930 to 5935, were delivered by MLW in 1949. They were the last standard gauge steam locomotives to be built in Canada for a Canadian railway. These were very similar to the T1b class, apart from a few refinements, which included two cross-compound air compressors to speed up recharging of the air brake system, while some small streamlining touches were not retained, such as the streamlined casing around the smokebox stack and the teardrop shape of the classification lights. In addition, the insides of the cabs were no longer insulated in the same manner as the previous versions, which had provided better cold-weather cab insulation and were better liked by crews. The last Selkirks were taken out of service in 1959. These were the most powerful steam locomotives in the British Empire.

=== Japan ===
In 1948, the JGR built five Class E10 tank locomotives for the purpose of supplementing the aging Class 4110 (0-10-0) in Itaya Pass on the Ou Main Line for a short time until electrification. E10 2 is statically stored.

=== South Africa ===
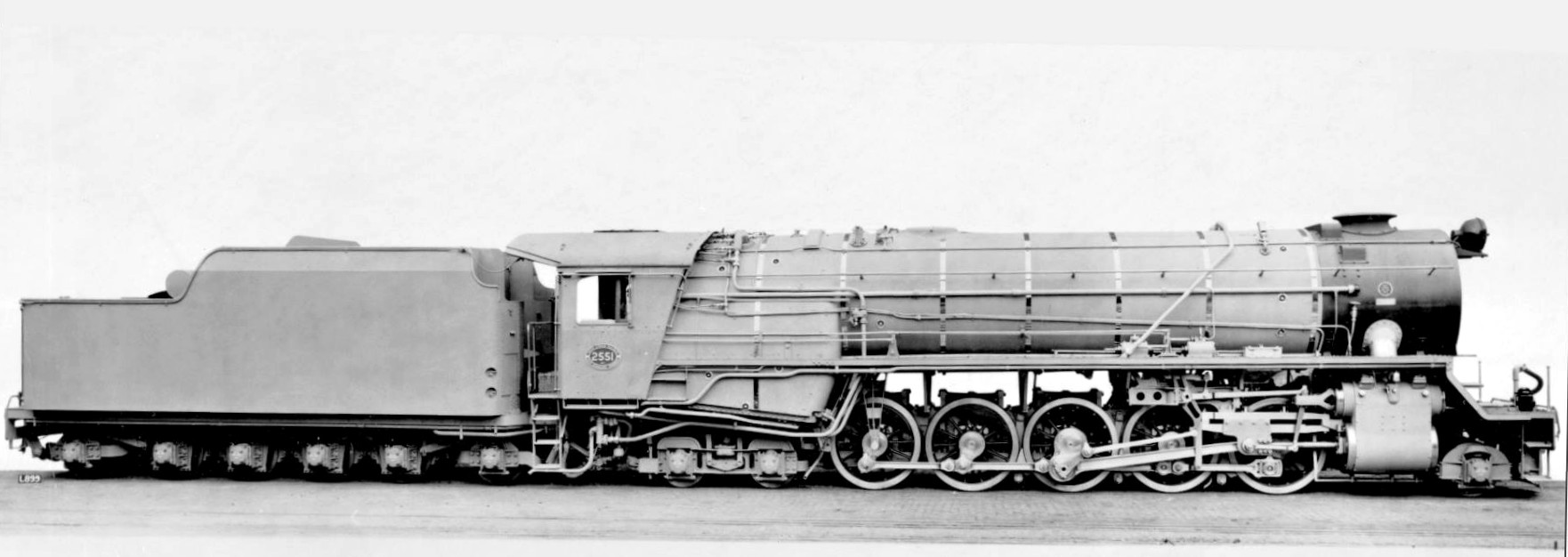
SAR Class 21, circa 1937

In 1937, the South African Railways (SAR) placed one 3 ft 6 in (1,067 mm) Cape gauge 2-10-4 Class 21 steam locomotive in service, designed for mixed traffic and suitable for light rail. It was designed by A.G. Watson, chief mechanical engineer of the SAR from 1929 to 1936, and built by the North British Locomotive Company in Glasgow. It was the only example built, and represented the maximum power obtainable on Cape gauge from a non-articulated locomotive limited to a 15 long tons (15.2 t) axle load and 60 lb/yd (30 kg/m) rail. In order to negotiate tight curves, the third and fourth sets of coupled wheels were flangeless.

The locomotive's Type FT tender was an experimental type using six pairs of wheels in a 2-8-2 wheel arrangement, with the leading and trailing wheels as bissel-type pony trucks and the remainder mounted on a rigid wheelbase. A similar Type JV tender had been built in the Salt River shops in Cape Town in 1936 as a prototype to the Type FT. The wheel arrangement was not very successful however, and not used again.

=== Soviet Union ===
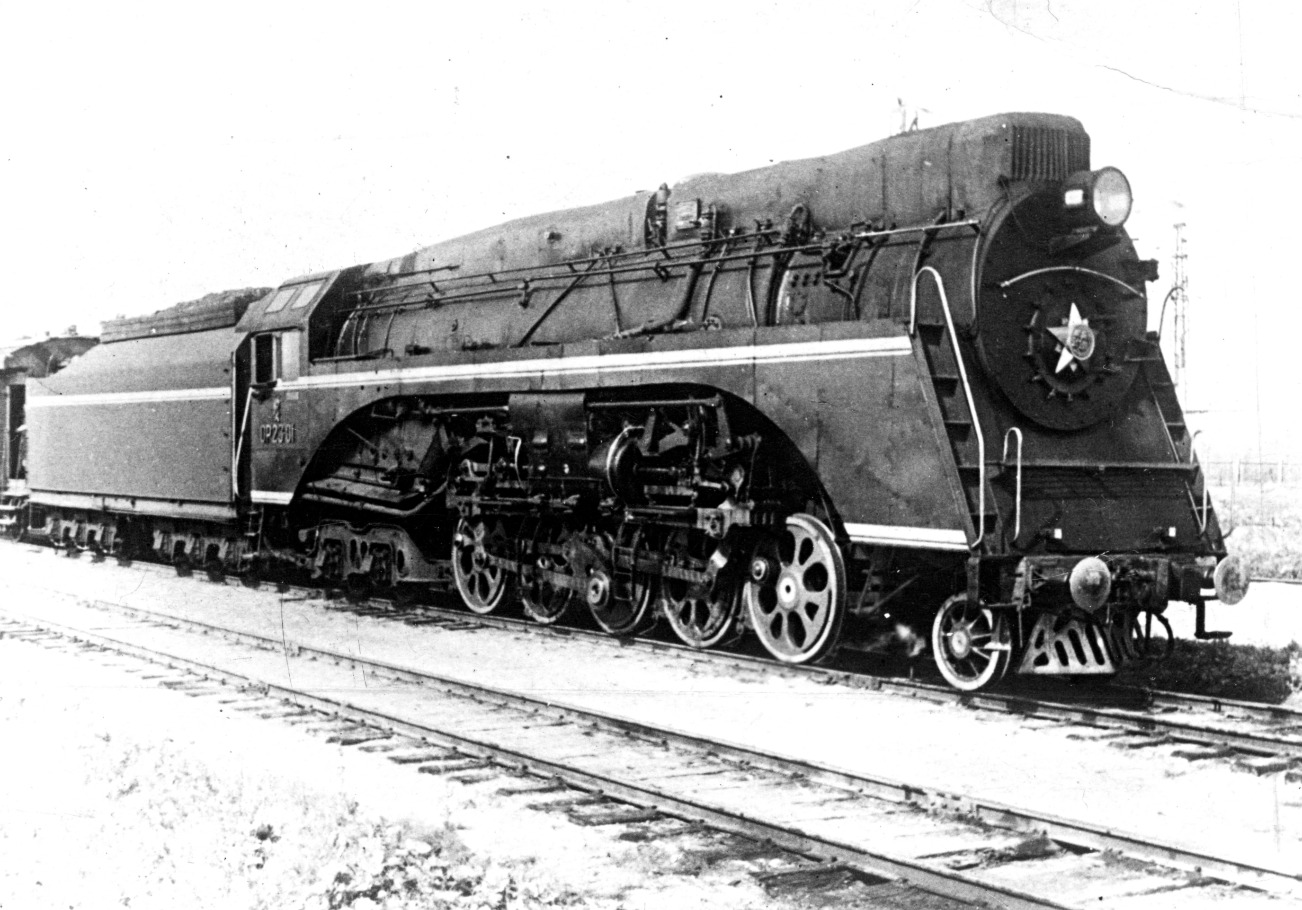
Soviet class OR23, circa 1949

Two Texas-type locomotives were built in the USSR. One, the class OR23, built in 1949 by the locomotive works in Ulan Ude, had cylinders that were placed above the center driving axle. Unlike nearly all steam locomotives, the pistons had rods on both ends, which transferred power to the wheels. The idea was to balance the driving forces on the wheels, allowing the counterweights on the wheels to be smaller and reducing hammer blow on the track. Test runs showed, however, that the OR23 design was unsuitable as a practical locomotive. The locomotive was never used for more than testing and was returned to its builder and scrapped.

=== United States ===
==== Atchison, Topeka and Santa Fe Railway ====
The Atchison, Topeka and Santa Fe Railway (ATSF) took delivery of locomotive No. 3829 from the Baldwin Locomotive Works in 1919. It was used by ATSF as an experimental locomotive and was rostered as a member of ATSF's 3800 class of 2-10-2s that was fitted with a four-wheel trailing truck. Nearly 100 more 3800 class locomotives were delivered after No. 3829, but all with the 2-10-2 wheel arrangement. Photographs exist that show No. 3829 fitted with at least two different designs of four-wheel trailing truck through the years. No other members of the 3800 class have been documented with four-wheel trailing trucks. No. 3829 was scrapped in 1955, still equipped with a four-wheel trailing truck.

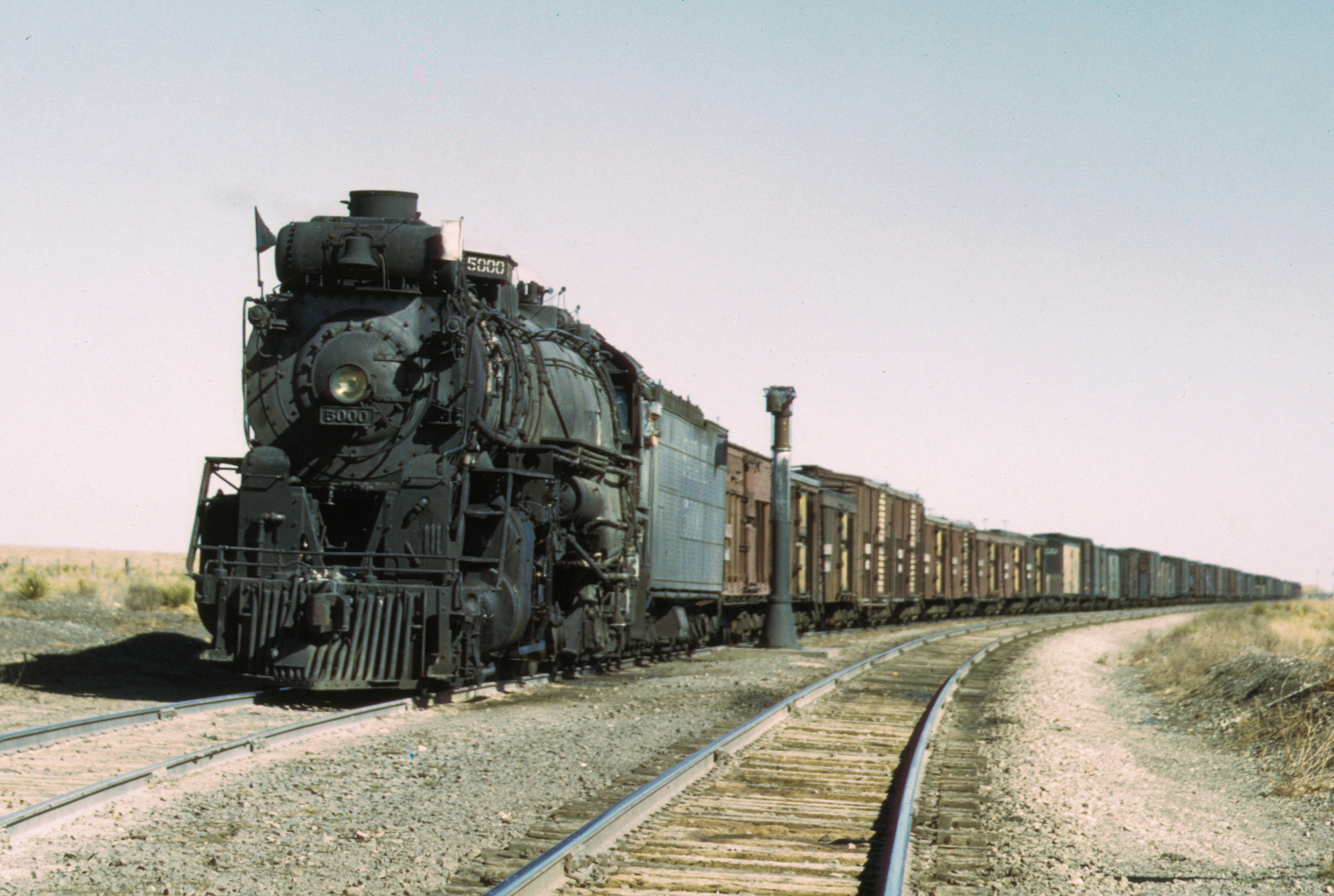
ATSF 2-10-4 No. 5000 Madame Queen

Santa Fe, which had originated the 2-10-4 type, adopted it again in 1930 with No. 5000, named Madame Queen. This locomotive was similar to the C&O T-1, with the same 69 in (1,750 mm) drivers, but with 300 psi (2.1 MPa) boiler pressure and 60% limited cutoff. It proved the viability of the type on the ATSF, but the Great Depression shelved plans to acquire more.

In 1938, with the railroad's fortunes improving, ATSF acquired 10 more 2-10-4 locomotives. These came with 74 in (1,880 mm) diameter drivers and 310 psi (2.1 MPa) boiler pressure, making these ATSF 2-10-4s the fastest and most modern of all.

Of the original order of ten, five were oil-burning and five coal-burning, but when Santa Fe ordered 25 more for delivery in 1944, all were delivered equipped to burn oil. The first of the 1944 batch produced 5,600 drawbar horsepower (4.2 MW) on road test, the highest figure known for a two-cylinder steam locomotive.

==== Texas and Pacific ====
The 2-10-4 type was revived in 1925 by the Lima Locomotive Works. This time, it was an expansion of the 2-8-4 Berkshire type that Lima had pioneered. A version of the Berkshire with 10 driving wheels instead of eight was an obvious development and the first to be delivered were to the Texas and Pacific Railway, after which the type was subsequently named. The four-wheel trailing truck allowed a much larger firebox, thus a greater ability to generate heat, and thus steam. The Superpower design, as Lima's marketing department called it, resulted in a locomotive that could develop great power at speed while not running out of steam-generating ability.

==== Bessemer and Lake Erie ====
Baldwin built a fleet of 47 H-1 class 2-10-4s for the Bessemer and Lake Erie Railroad, an iron ore–hauling railroad, between 1929 and 1944, in eight subclasses numbered 601–647. Calculated tractive force was 102,106 lbf (454.19 kN), average weight was over 500,000 lb (230 t), and boiler pressure was 250 psi (1.7 MPa). Eighteen were sold in 1951 to the Duluth, Missabe and Iron Range Railway, another ore-hauling railroad, that renumbered them 700–717. By the beginning of the 1960s, all but one were sold for scrap. The exception was No. 643, which almost operated in excursion service in the late 1990s, but for its large size. It is now owned by the Age of Steam Roundhouse.

==== Chesapeake and Ohio ====
The early Lima-built Texas types were low-drivered, 60 to 64 in (1,520 to 1,630 mm) in diameter, which did not leave enough space to fully counterweight the extremely heavy and sturdy side rods and main rods required for such a powerful locomotive's piston thrusts. That changed in 1930 on the Chesapeake and Ohio Railway (C&O), which stretched the design of an Erie Railroad high-drivered Berkshire type locomotive to produce 40 of the C&O T-1, a Texas type with 69 in (1,750 mm) diameter drivers that was both powerful and fast enough for the new higher-speed freight services that the railroads were introducing. All subsequent Texas types were of this higher-drivered sort.

==== Chicago Great Western Railway ====
The Chicago Great Western Railway was an unusual customer for 2-10-4s as it was a 'granger' railroad, operating in the predominantly flat Midwestern United States. Traffic was overwhelmingly agricultural in nature, with few fast freights or express passenger services. By the end of the 1920s the CGW had few especially large locomotives on its roster, having quickly given up a brief experiment with Mallet types. The largest types in traffic were USRA Light Mikados and most trains were handled by 2-8-0 locomotives - with multiple engines per train on the CGW's isolated steep valley grades.

With the arrival of the Great Depression and its locomotive fleet ageing, the CGW chose a major upgrade with 2-10-4 locomotives, ordering 36 shared between Lima and Baldwin. They arrived into service during 1930 in three batches, which differed in detail but were to the same fundamental design. All had 63 in (1,600 mm) diameter drivers, 29 in × 32 in (740 mm × 810 mm) cylinders and a 255 psi boiler pressure - the same basic specification as the successful Texas & Pacific fleet of 2-10-4s.

The 2-10-4s allowed the CGW to dramatically improve its operational efficiency - trains could be heavier yet faster and double heading and banking was eliminated in many locations. Fewer trains hauling more tonnage allowed the railroad to cut many jobs, so the new big locomotives were not well-received by employees. Being much heavier than previous CGW locomotives the 2-10-4s were barred from certain parts of the CGW system with lightly-laid track (they could not cross the bridge over the Missouri at Leavenworth, Kansas, for instance, and so could not work trains through to the CGW yard at Kansas City). Freight trains hauled by the 2-10-4s had to be given priority over passenger trains at certain points because sidings were too lightly-laid to handle the heavy locomotives. The CGW carried out a programme of relaying key sections of track with heavier rail in the mid-1930s to properly handle the 2-10-4s and in doing so became the first American railroad to install continuous welded rail. The 2-10-4s promoted a new way of working on the CGW, which adopted a principle of fewer but much longer and heavier trains - a practice usually seen on transcontinental railroads in the West rather than granger routes in the prairies. The CGW continued this principle after dieselization in the late 1940s, which saw all the 2-10-4s withdrawn between 1948 and 1950.

==== Pennsylvania Railroad ====
The Pennsylvania Railroad (PRR) ordered few new locomotives after 1930, since electrification both consumed the railroad's resources and resulted in a supply of excess steam locomotives that eliminated any requirement for new power. Until the Second World War had begun, the PRR's locomotive fleet had not begun to appear inadequate. Although the PRR urgently needed new and modern freight power, the War Production Board prohibited working on a new design, and not enough time remained to trial a prototype in any event, the PRR cast around for other railroads' designs that it might modify for PRR use.

It settled on the C&O's T-1. Some modifications were made to the design for these PRR "War Babies". These included PRR drop-couplers, sheet-steel pilots, PRR-style cabs, large PRR tenders, Keystone-shaped number plates up front, and other modifications. It still betrayed its foreign heritage by lacking the PRR trademark Belpaire firebox and by having a booster engine on the trailing truck. Altogether, 125 locomotives were built between 1942 and 1944 and became the largest fleet of Texas-type locomotives in existence. All were eventually sold as scrap when the Pennsylvania Railroad converted to diesel.

==== North American owners of Texas types ====
2-10-4 North American construction roster
Railroad (quantity; class name)	Class	Road numbers	Builder	Build year	Notes
Atchison, Topeka and Santa Fe (37; Texas)	3800	3829	Baldwin	1919	Originally a Santa Fe 2-10-2 type, No. 3829 was used as an experimental engine and was the first 2-10-2 steam engine (tender version) to be fitted with a four-wheeled trailing truck as a replacement for the two-wheeled truck that No. 3829 was originally built with. Santa Fe No. 3829 was also the first steam locomotive (tender version) to use this 2-10-4 "Texas" type wheel arrangement in the United States. Scrapped 1959
Atchison, Topeka and Santa Fe (37; Texas)	5000	5000	Baldwin	1930	preserved
Atchison, Topeka and Santa Fe (37; Texas)	5001	5001–5010	Baldwin	1938	Scrapped 1959
Atchison, Topeka and Santa Fe (37; Texas)	5011	5011–5035	Baldwin	1944	5011, 5017, 5021 & 5030 preserved
Bessemer & Lake Erie (47; Texas) 18 of the B&LE's 2-10-4 locomotives were sold to the Duluth, Missabe & Iron Range (DMIR), who retained the "Texas" class name on these locomotives	H-1	601	Baldwin	1929	Scrapped 1951
Bessemer & Lake Erie (47; Texas) 18 of the B&LE's 2-10-4 locomotives were sold to the Duluth, Missabe & Iron Range (DMIR), who retained the "Texas" class name on these locomotives	H-1a	602–610	Baldwin	1930	Scrapped 1952
Bessemer & Lake Erie (47; Texas) 18 of the B&LE's 2-10-4 locomotives were sold to the Duluth, Missabe & Iron Range (DMIR), who retained the "Texas" class name on these locomotives	H-1b	611–620	Baldwin	1936	Scrapped 1952
Bessemer & Lake Erie (47; Texas) 18 of the B&LE's 2-10-4 locomotives were sold to the Duluth, Missabe & Iron Range (DMIR), who retained the "Texas" class name on these locomotives	H-1c	621–630	ALCO	1937	Scrapped 1953
Bessemer & Lake Erie (47; Texas) 18 of the B&LE's 2-10-4 locomotives were sold to the Duluth, Missabe & Iron Range (DMIR), who retained the "Texas" class name on these locomotives	H-1d	631–635	Baldwin	1941	Scrapped 1953
Bessemer & Lake Erie (47; Texas) 18 of the B&LE's 2-10-4 locomotives were sold to the Duluth, Missabe & Iron Range (DMIR), who retained the "Texas" class name on these locomotives	H-1e	636–637	Baldwin	1942	Scrapped 1954
Bessemer & Lake Erie (47; Texas) 18 of the B&LE's 2-10-4 locomotives were sold to the Duluth, Missabe & Iron Range (DMIR), who retained the "Texas" class name on these locomotives	H-1f	638–642	Baldwin	1943	Scrapped 1954
Bessemer & Lake Erie (47; Texas) 18 of the B&LE's 2-10-4 locomotives were sold to the Duluth, Missabe & Iron Range (DMIR), who retained the "Texas" class name on these locomotives	H-1g	643–647	Baldwin	1944	643 preserved
Canadian Pacific (37; Selkirk)	T1a	5900–5919	MLW	1929	Scrapped 1959
Canadian Pacific (37; Selkirk)	T4a	8000	CP Angus Shops	1931	Scrapped 1959
Canadian Pacific (37; Selkirk)	T1b	5920–5929	MLW	1938	Streamlined Scrapped 1959
Canadian Pacific (37; Selkirk)	T1c	5930–5935	MLW	1949	Streamlined. 5931 & 5935 preserved
Central Vermont (10; Texas)	T-3-a	700–709	ALCO	1928	Scrapped 1947-1958
Chesapeake and Ohio (40; Texas)	T-1	3000–3039	Lima	1930	Scrapped 1952-1953
Chicago, Burlington & Quincy (18; Colorado)	M-4	6310–6321	Baldwin	1927	Scrapped 1952, 6315 used for a doubleheader excursion in September 1959, snapped valve gear at speed, scrapped by 1964
Chicago, Burlington & Quincy (18; Colorado)	M-4	6322–6327	Baldwin	1929	Scrapped 1953
Chicago Great Western (36; Texas)	T-1	850–864; 880–882	Lima	1930	1948 Scrapped
Chicago Great Western (36; Texas)	T-2	865–873	Baldwin	1930	1948 Scrapped
Chicago Great Western (36; Texas)	T-3	874–879	Baldwin	1930	1949 Scrapped
Chicago Great Western (36; Texas)	T-3	883–885	Lima	1931	1950 Scrapped
Kansas City Southern (10; Texas)	J	900–909	Lima	1937	Scrapped 1954
Pennsylvania Railroad (125; Texas)	J1	6450–6474	PRR Altoona Works	1942	Scrapped 1958
Pennsylvania Railroad (125; Texas)	J1	6401–6434; 6475–6500	PRR Altoona Works	1943	Scrapped 1958
Pennsylvania Railroad (125; Texas)	J1	6435–6449; 6150–6174	PRR Altoona Shops	1944	Scrapped 1959
Texas & Pacific (70; Texas)	I-1	600–609	Lima	1925	Scrapped 1950-1951
Texas & Pacific (70; Texas)	I-1a	610–624	Lima	1927	610 preserved
Texas & Pacific (70; Texas)	I-1b	625–639	Lima	1928	Scrapped 1951, 638 initially put on display at the Texas State Fairgrounds, but later vandalized and scrapped.
Texas & Pacific (70; Texas)	I-1c	640–654	Lima	1928	Scrapped 1951-1952
Texas & Pacific (70; Texas)	I-1d	655–669	Lima	1929	Scrapped 1953

==== Preserved Texas types in North America ====
Railroad	Road number	Location
AT&SF	5000	Amarillo, TX
AT&SF	5011	National Museum of Transportation, St. Louis, MO
AT&SF	5017	National Railroad Museum, Green Bay, WI
AT&SF	5021	California State Railroad Museum, Sacramento, CA
AT&SF	5030	Salvador Perez Park, Santa Fe, NM
B&LE	643	Age of Steam Roundhouse, Sugarcreek, OH
CP	5931	Heritage Park Historical Village, Calgary, AB
CP	5935	Canadian Railway Museum, Delson, QC
T&P	610	Texas State Railroad, Palestine, TX
