= Bridge Stress Committee =

The Bridge Stress Committee was appointed in 1923 by the UK Department of Scientific and Industrial Research under Sir Alfred Ewing, to investigate stresses in railway bridges, especially as regards the effects of moving loads. Its report, published in 1928, was very influential in British locomotive design as it enabled larger multi-cylinder locomotive classes.

== Background ==
The increased weight of express trains in the United Kingdom during the first quarter of the twentieth century required larger, six-coupled locomotives, but new designs were being limited by the weight restrictions imposed on many underline bridges. On most mainlines this was restricted to no more than 20 long tons (20.3 t; 22.4 short tons) on any axle. However, engineers were becoming increasingly aware of the significance of ‘hammer blow’ rather than ’deadweight’ in determining the safe loads for such bridges.

== Committee ==
A committee of was established in 1923, funded jointly by the UK government and the railway companies, to carry out investigations in to the effects of hammer blow on bridges. The committee under chairmanship of the physicist Sir James Alfred Ewing consisted primarily of railway civil engineers, but Sir Henry Fowler, Chief Mechanical Engineer of the London Midland and Scottish Railway was also later invited to join. Among the results was a better understanding of hammer blow and the effects of oscillations in both locomotive springs and bridges. One immediate impact of the investigations was an easing of the axle-load limit for locomotives with both inside and outside cylinders from 20 long tons (20.3 t; 22.4 short tons) to 22 long tons (22.4 t; 24.6 short tons). This enabled successful new designs such as the GWR 6000 Class and the fitting of larger 220 psi (1.52 MPa) boilers to Gresley A1 class.
