= South African Class 21 2-10-4 =

1937 design of steam locomotive

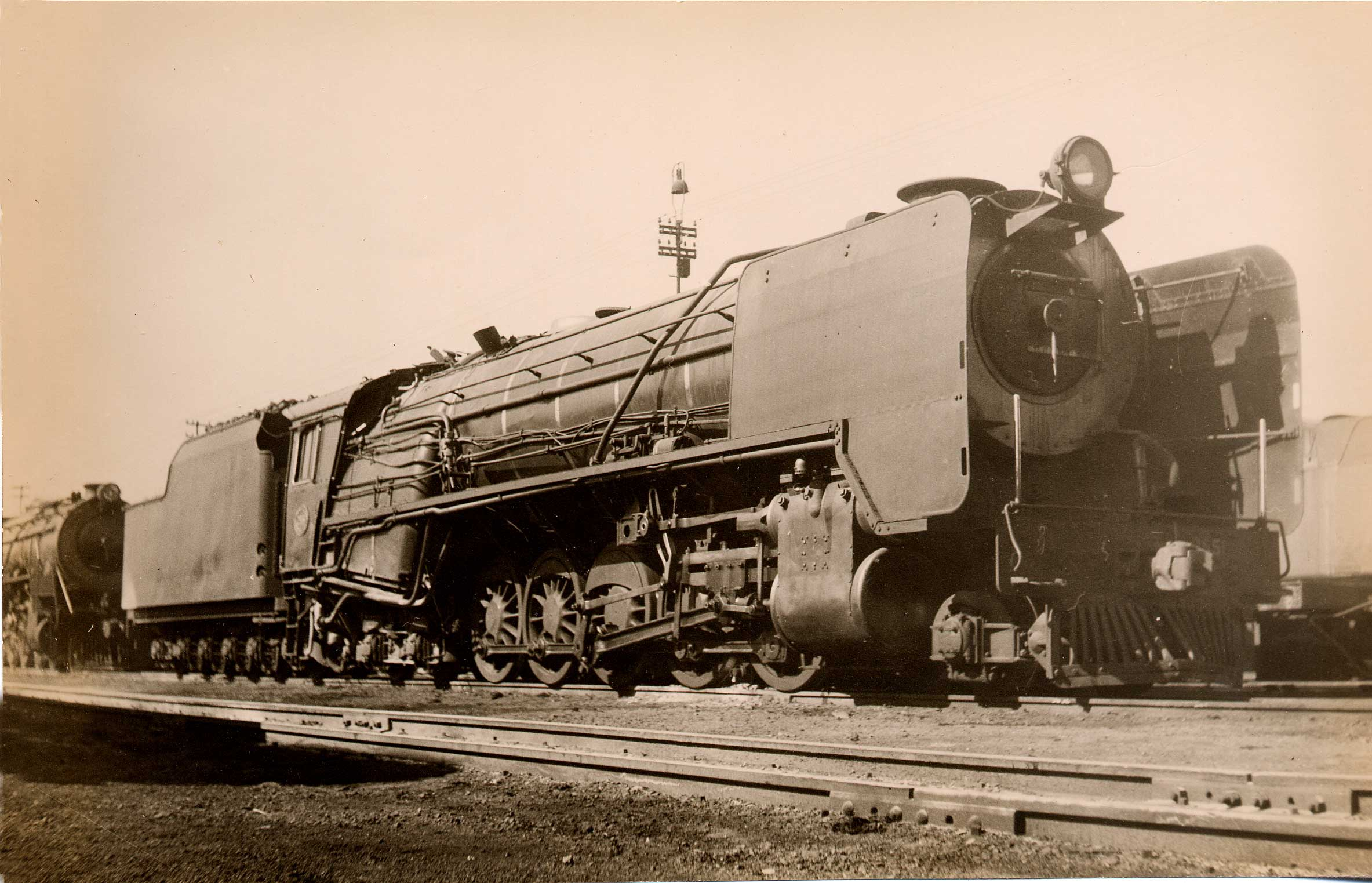
- No. 2551 with smoke deflectors
Type and origin
- Power type: Steam
- Designer: South African Railways (A.G. Watson)
- Builder: North British Locomotive Company
- Serial number: 24379
- Model: Class 21
- Build date: 1937
- Total produced: 1
Specifications
- Configuration
  - Whyte: 2-10-4 (Texas)
  - UIC: 1'E2'h2
- Driver: 3rd coupled axle
- Gauge: 3 ft 6 in (1,067 mm) Cape gauge
- Leading dia.: 30 in (762 mm)
- Coupled dia.: 54 in (1,372 mm)
- Trailing dia.: 30 in (762 mm)
- Tender wheels: 34 in (864 mm)
- Minimum curve: 300 ft (91 m)
- Wheelbase: 68 ft 4 1/4 in (20,834 mm)
  - Axle spacing (Asymmetrical): 1-2: 4 ft 9 in (1,448 mm); 2-3: 4 ft 8 in (1,422 mm); 3-4: 4 ft 8 in (1,422 mm); 4-5: 4 ft 8 in (1,422 mm)
  - Engine: 36 ft 9 in (11,201 mm)
  - Coupled: 18 ft 9 in (5,715 mm)
  - Trailing: 4 ft 6 in (1,372 mm)
  - Tender: 22 ft 3 in (6,782 mm)
  - Tender bogie: 12 ft 3 in (3,734 mm) rigid
- Length
  - Over couplers: 76 ft 10 1/4 in (23,425 mm)
- Height: 13 ft (3,962 mm)
- Frame type: Bar
- Axle load: 14 LT 19 cwt (15,190 kg)
  - Leading: 11 LT 7 cwt (11,530 kg)
  - 1st coupled: 14 LT (14,220 kg)
  - 2nd coupled: 14 LT 11 cwt (14,780 kg)
  - 3rd coupled: 14 LT 19 cwt (15,190 kg)
  - 4th coupled: 14 LT 12 cwt (14,830 kg)
  - 5th coupled: 14 LT 15 cwt (14,990 kg)
  - Trailing: 12 LT (12,190 kg) leading 10 LT 8 cwt (10,570 kg) trailing
  - Tender axle: Axle 1: 7 LT 18 cwt (8,027 kg); Axle 2: 12 LT 10 cwt (12,700 kg); Axle 3: 12 LT 10 cwt (12,700 kg); Axle 4: 12 LT 10 cwt (12,700 kg); Axle 5: 12 LT 10 cwt (12,700 kg); Axle 6: 7 LT 18 cwt (8,027 kg)
- Adhesive weight: 72 LT 17 cwt (74,020 kg)
- Loco weight: 106 LT 12 cwt (108,300 kg)
- Tender weight: 65 LT 16 cwt (66,860 kg)
- Total weight: 172 LT 8 cwt (175,200 kg)
- Tender type: FT (2-8-2 arrangement)
- Fuel type: Coal
- Fuel capacity: 10 LT (10.2 t)
- Water cap.: 5,587 imp gal (25,400 L)
- Firebox
  - Type: Round-top
  - Grate area: 63 sq ft (5.9 m^{2})
- Boiler
  - Model: Watson Standard no. 3B
  - Type: Domeless
  - Pitch: 9 ft (2,743 mm)
  - Diameter: 6 ft 2 1/4 in (1,886 mm)
  - Tube plates: 22 ft 6 in (6,858 mm)
  - Small tubes: 136: 2 1/2 in (64 mm)
  - Large tubes: 36: 5 1/2 in (140 mm)
- Boiler pressure: 210 psi (1,448 kPa)
- Safety valve: Pop
- Heating surface
  - Firebox: 206 sq ft (19.1 m^{2})
  - Tubes: 3,168 sq ft (294.3 m^{2})
  - Arch tubes: 26 sq ft (2.4 m^{2})
  - Total surface: 3,400 sq ft (320 m^{2})
- Superheater
  - Heating area: 676 sq ft (62.8 m^{2})
- Cylinders: Two
- Cylinder size: 24 in (610 mm) bore 26 in (660 mm) stroke
- Valve gear: Walschaerts
- Valve type: Piston
- Valve travel: 7 1/2 in (191 mm)
- Couplers: AAR knuckle
Performance figures
- Tractive effort: 43,700 lbf (194 kN) @ 75%
Career
- Operators: South African Railways
- Class: Class 21
- Number in class: 1
- Numbers: 2551
- Delivered: 1937
- First run: 1937
- Withdrawn: 1952
- The 3rd & 4th coupled axles had flangeless wheels

The South African Railways Class 21 2-10-4 of 1937 was a class of steam locomotives used in South Africa.

In 1937, the South African Railways placed a single Class 21 steam locomotive with a 2-10-4 Texas type wheel arrangement in service, designed as a mixed traffic locomotive suitable for use on light rail. A simultaneously proposed heavier mainline version Class 22 2-10-4 was never built.

== Manufacturer ==
The Class 21 2-10-4 Texas type locomotive was designed by A.G. Watson, Chief Mechanical Engineer (CME) of the South African Railways (SAR) from 1929 to 1936. It was built by the North British Locomotive Company in Glasgow and delivered in 1937. Only one locomotive was built, numbered 2551. At the time, the design represented the maximum power obtainable from a ten-coupled non-articulated locomotive which was limited to a 15 long tons (15.2 tonnes) axle load on 60 pounds per yard (30 kilograms per metre) rail.

== Characteristics ==
Watson disliked articulated locomotives and his aim was to develop a powerful non-articulated mixed traffic branch line locomotive with an axle load suitable for light rail. To enable it to negotiate tight curves of 300 feet (91 metres) radius, the third and fourth coupled wheelsets were flangeless. In addition, a total side play of 1 3/4 inches (44 millimetres) was provided on the leading coupled wheels and spherical bearings were fitted to the leading coupling rods. Its 5-inch thick (127-millimetre) bar frames extended from the front to the hind buffer beams and were stayed by cross stretchers of a light fabricated construction. It used a Watson Standard no. 3B boiler, the same as that used in the Classes 15E, 15F and 23.

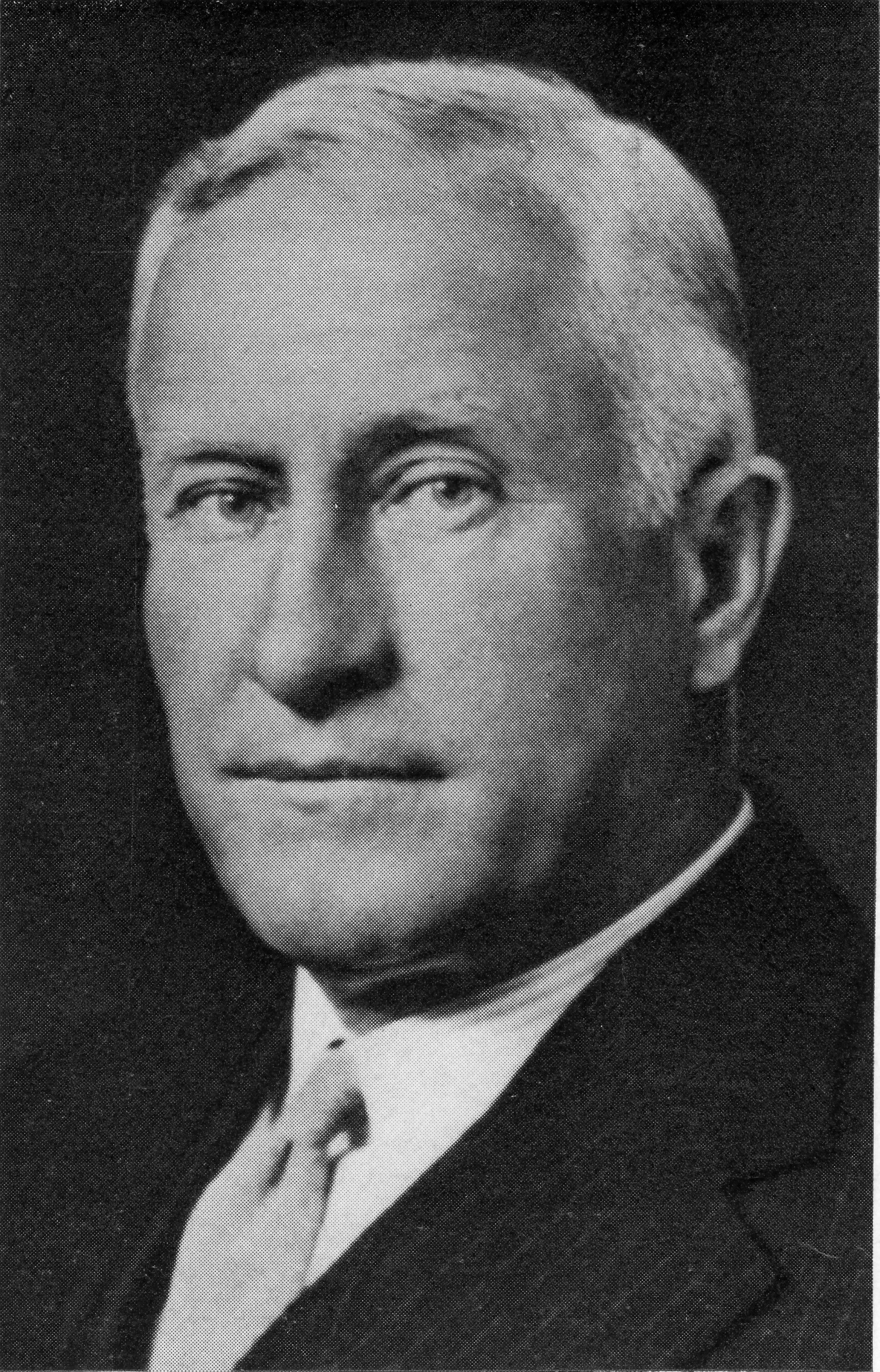
A.G. Watson

The result could be considered as Watson's answer to the Class GF Garratt locomotive, the two types having very similar axle loads. The Class 21 carried more water than the Garratt and was about 23 long tons (23.4 tonnes) heavier with 43,700 pounds-force (194.4 kilonewtons) tractive effort, compared to the 34,200 pounds-force (152.1 kilonewtons) of the Class GF. Even so, only one Class 21 was produced and the design was not repeated.

Watson's design called for cylinders with rotary cam poppet valve gear, but since the locomotive was still under construction when Watson retired, his successor as CME, W.A.J. Day, made use of the opportunity to alter the specifications. Thus, in the year following Watson's departure, the Class 21 locomotive was delivered with Walschaerts valve gear.

The cylinders were interchangeable with one another and with those of the Classes 15F and 23, even though the piston stroke of the Class 21 was 26 inches (660 millimetres) compared to 28 inches (711 millimetres) in respect of the other two classes. On the Class 21, the difference in stroke was made up by providing deep spigots on the cylinder covers.

The 2-10-4 Texas type wheel arrangement had not been tried before on the SAR. To distribute the axle loads to within the maximum allowed for branch lines, the ten-coupled arrangement with a four-wheeled trailing bogie was required. To further assist with keeping within the permissible weight limits, the cab was of welded construction and all footplates and running boards were made of duralumin while the axles and crank pins of the coupled wheels were hollow and the connecting rods were of special high tensile steel.

The equalised suspension of the engine was arranged in the customary three groups. The leading Bissel bogie and the first two pairs of coupled wheels were equalising in one group, while the remaining three pairs of coupled wheels were equalised with the trailing bogie, on each side (not cross-connected); thus three groups. As is usual, cross equalisation (LHS to RHS) was provided between the leading Bissel bogie and leading coupled wheels. Instead of pins, case-hardened cotters were provided for fulcrums of the bearing spring equalisinging beams. The proportion of balanced reciprocating parts was only 6% which reduced the hammer blow on the rails to 5 long hundredweight (254 kilograms) per wheel at 50 miles per hour (80 kilometres per hour). The locomotive was noted for its smooth running.

== Tender ==
The Type FT tender was an unusual type which used six pairs of wheels in a 2-8-2 wheel arrangement, with the leading and trailing wheels in Bissel-type pony trucks and the rest of the axles mounted with a rigid wheelbase. Like the leading and trailing wheels of the engine, all tender wheels were fitted with roller bearings. The rationale behind the design was that if the tender frame could be carried on more points represented by the rigid and Bissel wheels instead of on only two bogie pivot centres, the frame could be made lighter.

The tender was equipped with a mechanical stoker. The water tank was of welded construction and the coal bunker was of the self-trimming design. Each Bissel truck was compensated with two pairs of rigidly mounted wheels. The eight rigidly mounted wheels were fitted with overhead laminated bearing springs while the spring gear for each pony truck and two adjacent axles were compensated throughout the springing system, constituting two equal groups. Vacuum cylinders mounted on top of the tank actuated brake blocks on the rigidly mounted wheels.

The tender's wheel arrangement did not prove to be very successful and with the exception of the Type JV tender, a similar experimental tender which had been built in the Salt River shops in 1936 during the design phase of the Class 21 as a prototype test-model of the Type FT tender, it was not used again on the SAR. Comparison, in working order, with the Type MR tender showed that the Type FT tender weighed 30,128 pounds (13,666 kilograms) more than the Type MR while it carried the same amount of coal and only 987 imperial gallons (4,490 litres) more water, the difference representing a weight of 9,870 pounds (4,477 kilograms).

Another characteristic unique to the Type FT tender and its Type JV prototype was their left sides, where both had a space built-in to stow the fire-irons and rakes. The stowage space was open at the top, where the upper sides of both tender types were tied to the top of the coal bunker by four metal straps.

The Bissel or pony axle design is commonly used on steam locomotives with a single leading or trailing axle and was later also used on the Class 4E electric and Classes 32-000 and 32-200 diesel-electric locomotives.

== Service ==
The locomotive began its career on trials at Braamfontein in 1937, working the Rhodesian Mail trains between Randfontein and Mafeking. The Class GM entered service a year later and when it was found that the Garratt outperformed the Class 21 on this line, no. 2551 was transferred to Pretoria where it spent the rest of its working life on the line between Pretoria and the Eastern Transvaal. Here it took loads exceeding those given to the Class 15CA.

At the time, it seemed that ten-coupled engines could not be used as general utility types suitable for the rather severe curvature which existed on SAR lines, particularly those with rail of 45 pounds per yard (22 kilograms per metre) and 60 pounds per yard (30 kilograms per metre) where the curvature was generally more severe than elsewhere. A ten-coupled locomotive could only have 25% more tractive effort than an eight-coupled engine of similar axle load and with really heavy loads, the Garratt type had definite advantages and was much less severe on the track.

During the Second World War, the locomotive was often used to haul long and heavy military trains, troop trains and sometimes Italian prisoners-of-war to the military unit and prisoner-of-war camp at Sonderwater near Cullinan. In the process it was made the official mascot of the oldest military unit in Pretoria, the Pretoria Regiment (Princess Alice's Own). The Class 21 was the only SAR locomotive to be honoured in this way by the armed forces.

The Class 21 was scrapped in 1952 after only 15 years in service. During its time in service, it was equipped with smoke deflectors. Neither the Class 21 nor the aborted Class 22 design was repeated in either its original or modified form, leaving the impression that they represented advanced thinking which appears to have been considered as too far and too fast by Watson's successors.

When it was scrapped at the Pretoria shops, its Watson Standard no. 3B boiler was repaired and retained as a spare for use on the other locomotive classes equipped with this boiler model. Its Type FT tender was allocated to Kroonstad Loco as a spare tender for use on Class 15F locomotives, since all the Class 15Fs shedded at Kroonstad at the time were fitted with mechanical stokers. The Type FT could work coupled to these engines because they used the same type of Watson Standard no. 3B boiler and firebox arranged for mechanical firing as the Class 21. The tender was rarely used, if ever, since it had a smaller coal and water capacity than the Type JT tender normally fitted to the Class 15F.

== The aborted Class 22 ==
A design for a Class 22 steam locomotive, Watson's final design, was submitted at about the same time. The proposed Class 22 was also to have a 2-10-4 Texas wheel arrangement, but was to have been a heavy mainline version of the Class 21 with an axle load of 22 long tons (22.4 tonnes), the heaviest that current SAR track could bear on its 96 pounds per yard (48 kilograms per metre) mainline rail. It was to have been a massive machine with larger 60 inches (1,524 millimetres) coupled wheels, a larger 80 square feet (7.4 square metres) grate and the larger Type EW tender which was later to be used with the Class 23 locomotive.

If this engine had been built, it may have been one of the world's most outstanding locomotives. The proposed boiler pressure was 250 pounds per square inch (1,724 kilopascals), a figure never attained on the SAR, and its anticipated tractive effort of 66,406 pounds-force (295.39 kilonewtons) at 75% of boiler pressure would have made it capable of handling loads of 2,200 long tons (2,235 tonnes) on the coal run from Witbank to Johannesburg with comparative ease.

The design was a compromise between a 2-8-4 passenger class with 66 inches (1,676 millimetres) coupled wheels and a 2-10-2 freight locomotive with 60 inches (1,524 millimetres) coupled wheels. At the time, however, the demand for general utility locomotive types was so pronounced that no good argument could be put forward for the introduction of a heavy locomotive dedicated to goods working only. Another factor which acted against the project was the insufficient length of the receiving sidings in the yards which made it doubtful that such a locomotive would have been able to be used to its full capacity.

Although the Class 22 was never built, the class number was not used for another steam locomotive type.

== Illustration ==
The main picture shows no. 2551 with smoke deflectors installed, c. 1945, while the following show both sides of the locomotive and illustrate the difference between the left and right sides of the Type FT tender.

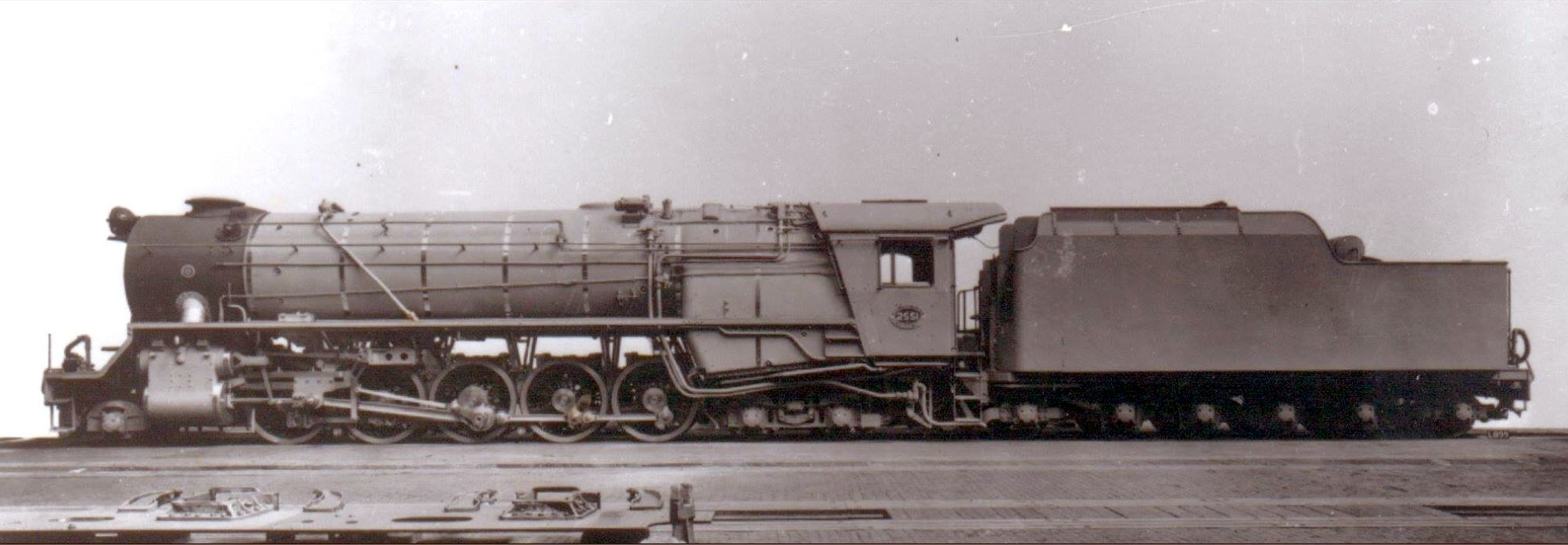

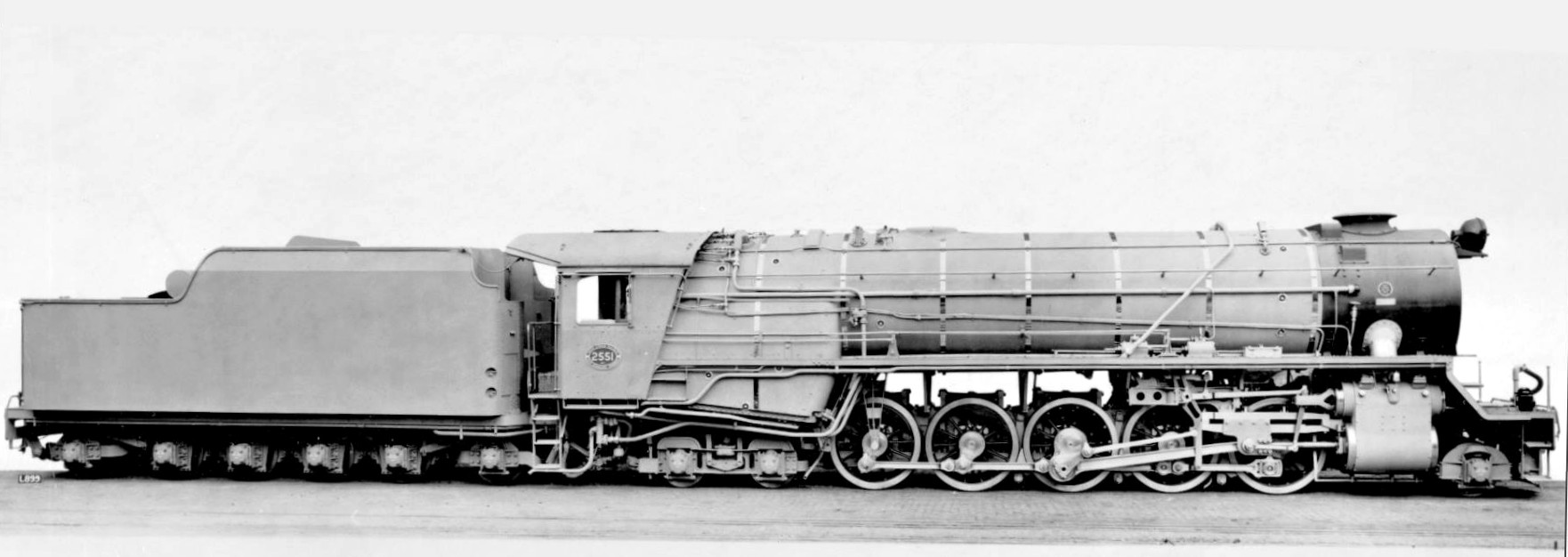
