= Soviet locomotive class OR23 =

OR23
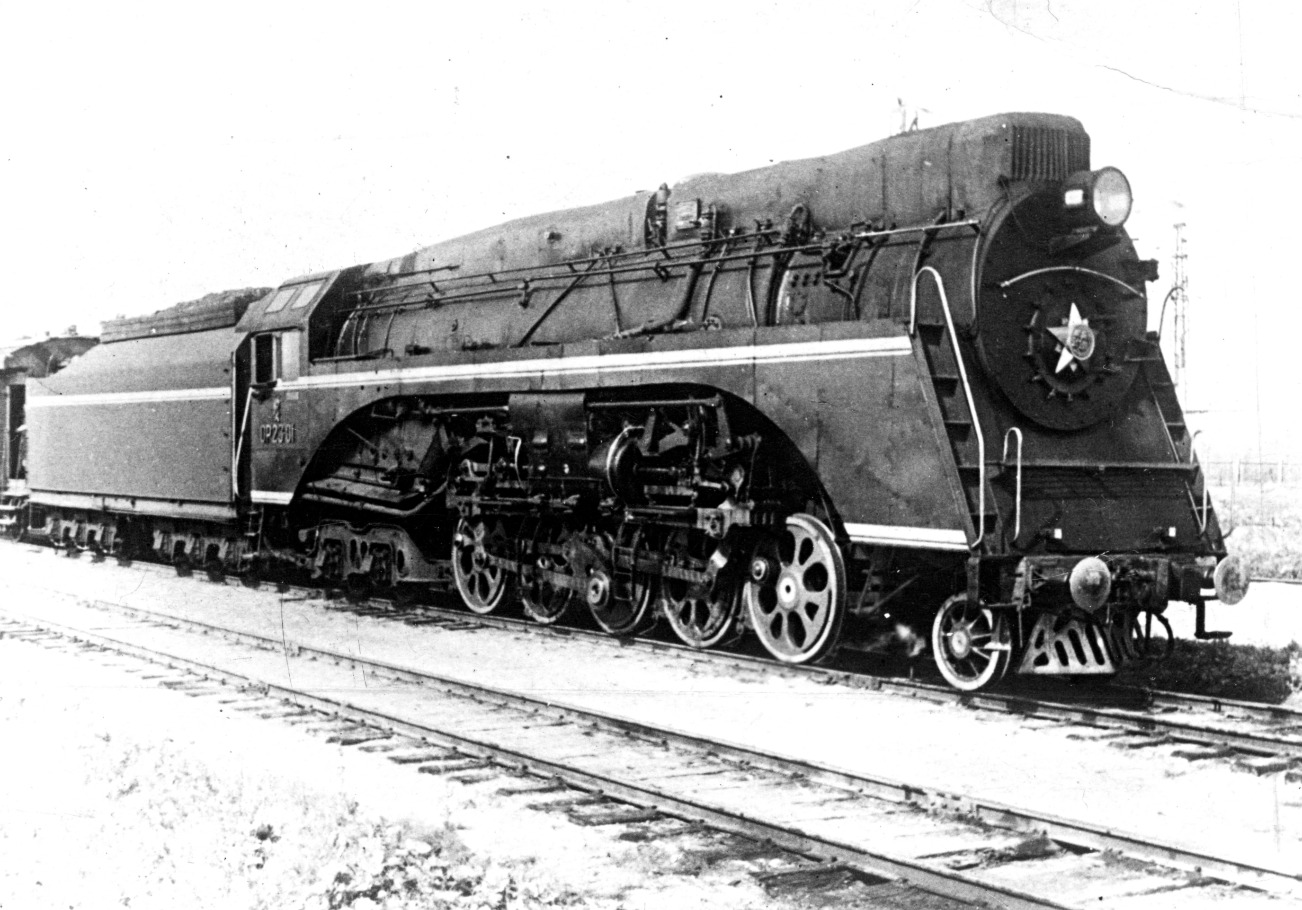
Type and origin
- Power type: Steam
- Designer: M. N. Anikeev, Yu. G. Kirilov and N. A. Turik
- Builder: Voroshilovgrad Locomotive Works
- Build date: 1949
- Total produced: 1
Specifications
- Configuration
  - Whyte: 2-10-4
- Gauge: 1,524 mm (5 ft)
- Leading dia.: 900 mm (2 ft 11 in)
- Driver dia.: 1,500 mm (4 ft 11 in)
- Trailing dia.: 1,050 mm (3 ft 5 in)
- Length: With tender: 29,540 mm (96 ft 11 in); Engine only: 16,775 mm (55 ft 0.4 in)
- Axle load
  - Coupled: 23.1 t (22.7 long tons; 25.5 short tons)
- Adhesive weight: 115.4 t (113.6 long tons; 127.2 short tons)
- Service weight: 168.1 t (165.4 long tons; 185.3 short tons)
- Tender type: Six-axle 6P
- Firebox
  - Grate area: 8.2 m^{2} (88 sq ft)
- Boiler pressure: 17 kgf/cm^{2} (240 psi; 17 bar)
- Heating surface: 324 m^{2} (3,490 sq ft)
- Superheater
  - Type: Double-turn Schmidt
  - Heating area: 184 m^{2} (1,980 sq ft)
- Cylinder size: 520 mm × 645 mm (20.5 in × 25.4 in)
Performance figures
- Maximum speed: 90 km/h (56 mph)
- Indicated power: 2,500 hp (1,900 kW)
Career
- Operators: Soviet Railways

The OR23 was a Soviet experimental locomotive built in 1949. Its cylinders were placed above the center driving axle, and had rods on both ends which transferred power to the wheels. The purpose was to balance the driving forces on the wheels, allowing the counterweights on the wheels to be smaller and reducing hammer blow on the track. The design was a failure and no further examples were built. The locomotive was never used beyond testing and was returned to its builder, the Voroshilovgrad Works, and scrapped sometime afterward.

== See also ==
- History of rail transport in Russia
- Russian Railway Museum, Saint Petersburg
