= Bessemer and Lake Erie 643 =

Preserved American 2-10-4 steam locomotive

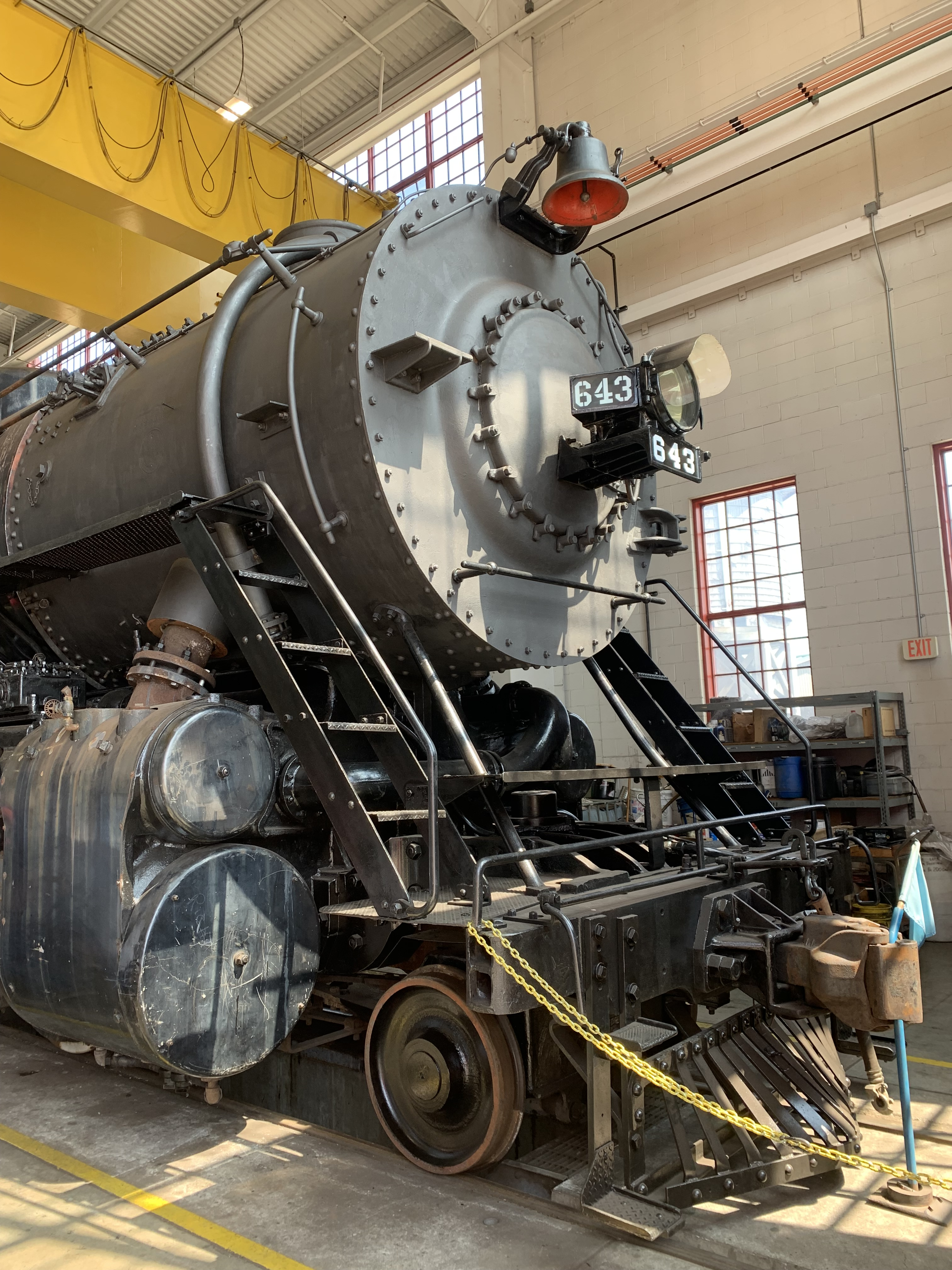
- No. 643 at the Age of Steam Roundhouse Museum backshop in 2024
Type and origin
- Power type: Steam
- Builder: Baldwin Locomotive Works
- Serial number: 70057
- Build date: 1944
Specifications
- Configuration
  - Whyte: 2-10-4
  - UIC: 1'E2' h2
- Gauge: 4 ft 8 1/2 in (1,435 mm) standard gauge
- Driver dia.: 64 in (1,600 mm)
- Wheelbase: 95.22 ft (29.02 m)
  - Engine: 45.50 ft (13.87 m)
  - Drivers: 22.30 ft (6.80 m)
- Length: 112 ft (34 m)
- Height: 16 ft (4.9 m)
- Axle load: 75,984 lb (34,466 kg)
- Adhesive weight: 372,277 lb (168,862 kg)
- Loco weight: 523,600 lb (237,500 kg)
- Tender weight: 385,120 lb (174,690 kg)
- Total weight: 908,720 lb (412,190 kg)
- Fuel type: Coal
- Fuel capacity: 26 t (26 long tons; 29 short tons)
- Water cap.: 23,000 US gal (87,000 L; 19,000 imp gal)
- Fuel consumption: 10,116 US gal (38,290 L; 8,423 imp gal) of water per hour
- Firebox
  - Grate area: 106.50 sq ft (9.894 m^{2})
- Boiler: 92 in (2,337 mm)
- Boiler pressure: 250 psi (1,700 kPa)
- Heating surface
  - Firebox: 576 sq ft (53.5 m^{2})
  - Tubes: 78 tubes (2.25 in (57 mm))
  - Arch tubes: 8,399 sq ft (780.3 m^{2})
  - Flues: 222 flues (3.5 in (89 mm))
  - Total surface: 5,912 sq ft (549.2 m^{2})
- Superheater
  - Heating area: 2,487 sq ft (231.0 m^{2})
- Cylinders: Two, outside
- Cylinder size: 31 in × 32 in (790 mm × 810 mm)
- Valve gear: Walschaerts
- Valve type: Piston valves
- Loco brake: Air
- Train brakes: Air
- Couplers: Knuckle
Performance figures
- Maximum speed: 50 mph (80 km/h)
- Tractive effort: Loco: 102,106 lbf (454.19 kN); Booster: 13,100 lbf (58 kN); Loco W/ Booster: 115,206 lbf (512.46 kN)
- Factor of adh.: 3.65
Career
- Operators: Bessemer and Lake Erie Railroad
- Class: H-1g
- Numbers: B&LE 643
- Nicknames: The King
- Retired: 1952
- Restored: 1998 (never operated); 2025 (cosmetically)
- Current owner: Age of Steam Roundhouse
- Disposition: On static display

Bessemer and Lake Erie Railroad 643 is the sole survivor of the H-1 class 2-10-4 "Texas" type steam locomotives built by the Baldwin Locomotive Works in 1944 for the Bessemer and Lake Erie Railroad, primarily used for hauling heavy mainline freight trains in Pennsylvania and Ohio, until retirement in 1952. As of 2026, No. 643 is owned by the Age of Steam Roundhouse Museum in Sugarcreek, Ohio.

== History ==
=== Revenue Service ===
Between 1929 and 1944, the Bessemer and Lake Erie Railroad, a class II company connecting Conneaut, Erie, and Bessemer, ordered a fleet of 47 H-1 class 2-10-4 "Texas" types, which were nearly direct copies of the Chicago, Burlington and Quincy's own fleet of 2-10-4 "Colorado" types, from the American Locomotive Company in Schenectady, New York, and the Baldwin Locomotive Works in Philadelphia, Pennsylvania. The H-1 class was divided into seven subclasses: a single prototype H-1a, number 601 in 1929; nine H-1bs, numbers 602-610 in 1930; ten H-1cs, numbers 611-620 in 1936; ten H-1ds, numbers 621-630 in 1937; five H-1es, numbers 631-635 in 1941; two H-1fs, numbers 636 and 637 in 1942; and ten H-1gs, numbers 638-647 in 1943 and 1944, with 643 among those built in 1944. The design varied little between subclasses with the exception of weight; the H-1a and H-1bs weighed 502,630 pounds, the H-1cs weighed 519,840 pounds, the H-1ds weighed 520,000 pounds, the H-1es weighed 519,740 pounds, the H-1fs weighed 524,382 pounds and the Class H-1gs weighed 523,600 pounds. The use of cast steel frames and different alloys in construction resulted in changes in weight between subclasses.

With a total tractive force of 102,106 pounds (or 115,206 pounds with boosters cut in), a boiler pressure of 250 pounds per square inch, and an average weight of over 500,000 pounds, these were some of the largest and most powerful non-articulated steam locomotives ever built in the United States. The H-1 series was assigned to heavy freight work on the B&LE, hauling trains of iron ore from lake freighters at docks on eastern Lake Erie to steel mills in the Pittsburgh area, and coal trains back to the lakefront.

In 1951, the B&LE decided to sell eighteen of their H-1s to the Duluth, Missabe and Iron Range Railway. These H-1s were reclassified as E-4s, E-5s, E-6s, and E-7s, and they were renumbered 700-717; No. 643, however, remained on the B&LE with the rest of the class. At this time, diesel locomotives were gradually usurping steam as the primary motive power for many North American railroads, and around the time of the sale of several of the railroad's 2-10-4s, the B&LE made the decision to dieselize its roster. Although capable and modern examples of steam power, all the H-1s had completed their last revenue freight assignments and had their fires dropped for the final time by the end of 1952. By the end of the decade, almost all locomotives of this particular design were sold for scrap, including all the CB&Q's Colorado types and all the DM&IR's 2-10-4s.

=== Preservation ===
Despite early dieselization, the B&LE decided to spare two of their steam locomotives from scrapping, No. 643 and 2-8-0 "Consolidation" No. 154. For safekeeping, the B&LE stored their steam locomotives inside their roundhouse in Greenville, Pennsylvania, with the intention of donating the locomotives to museums for future preservation. By the early 1980s, the B&LE had decided the time was right to auction off Numbers 154 and 643. Steamtown, U.S.A., which was still based in Bellows Falls, Vermont at the time, started bidding on No. 643 with the intent of moving it to Bellows Falls for static display, and eventually move it along with the rest of the collection to Scranton. The organization, however, was outbid by a man by the name of Glenn Campbell, who intended to restore No. 643 to operating condition for excursion service. Campbell would move the locomotive to the old Union Railroad shop in Hall in 1983 for storage until he would be able to purchase the former B&LE shops in McKees Rocks.

In 1993, No. 643 was finally moved to McKees Rocks, where restoration work would begin in earnest. At one point, No. 643 was moved under compressed air to test its movement and running gear, and the locomotive was also test-fired to determine its steaming capabilities. By the late 1990s, although the restoration work was completed, No. 643 never ran on any railroad or pulled trains. Although more than capable of pulling long trains, the locomotive's long, rigid wheelbase and weight necessitated relatively straight and heavy trackage to operate on; similar problems had marked the excursion career of another 2-10-4, Texas and Pacific 610. In light of this, few railroads could accommodate, or were willing to accommodate, such a massive locomotive in excursion service. No. 643 remained in storage inside the McKees Rocks shops awaiting an uncertain future, with further doubt cast after the McKees Rocks yard was isolated from live rail by CSX. In 2006, a snow storm caused cracks to form in the beams supporting the roof of the shops, forcing the movement of No. 643 outside before a potential collapse. From then on, No. 643 would be exposed to the elements while being put up for sale online with a high asking price for its purchase. The locomotive, with such a high price attached, sat in McKees Rocks without a buyer for several years.

In the spring of 2019, however, Campbell decreased the price to $375,000 on EBay, with the added publicity that the locomotive was at risk of being scrapped. In the months following, a willing buyer came forth. On August 5, 2019, the Age of Steam Roundhouse purchased No. 643 as an addition to their own collection of steam locomotives in Sugarcreek, Ohio. The acquisition was in tribute to the museum's late founder, Jerry Joe Jacobson, who nicknamed 643 “The King” and had long sought to add the locomotive to his roster. With the McKees Rocks yard still landlocked, No. 643 would have to be disassembled to be moved by truck. No. 643's boiler was separated from its frame and running gear, and the tender and appliances such as the headlight were moved first to Sugarcreek. In late January 2024, the boiler and frame of No. 643 followed, being loaded onto a flatcar and moved via CSX Transportation and Norfolk Southern Railway to the Age of Steam Roundhouse. By August 2024, 643’s frame and boiler had been rejoined, and the locomotive underwent cosmetic repairs in the museum’s back shop. In February 2025, 643's cosmetic restoration was completed and made its public debut in the roundhouse in late March.

== Historical significance ==
No. 643 is the sole survivor of the H-1 series of 2-10-4's of the B&LE, and one of two surviving B&LE steam locomotives. It ranks among the heaviest and most powerful non-articulated steam locomotives to operate, and one of the largest surviving steam locomotives in preservation in the United States. 643 is also one of only two 2-10-4's to be restored to operating condition after retirement, the other being the aforementioned T&P 610.

== See also ==
- Texas and Pacific 610
- Grand Trunk Western 6325
- Southern Pacific 5021
- Union Pacific 9000 Class
