= Santa Fe 5000 =

Preserved American 2-10-4 steam locomotive

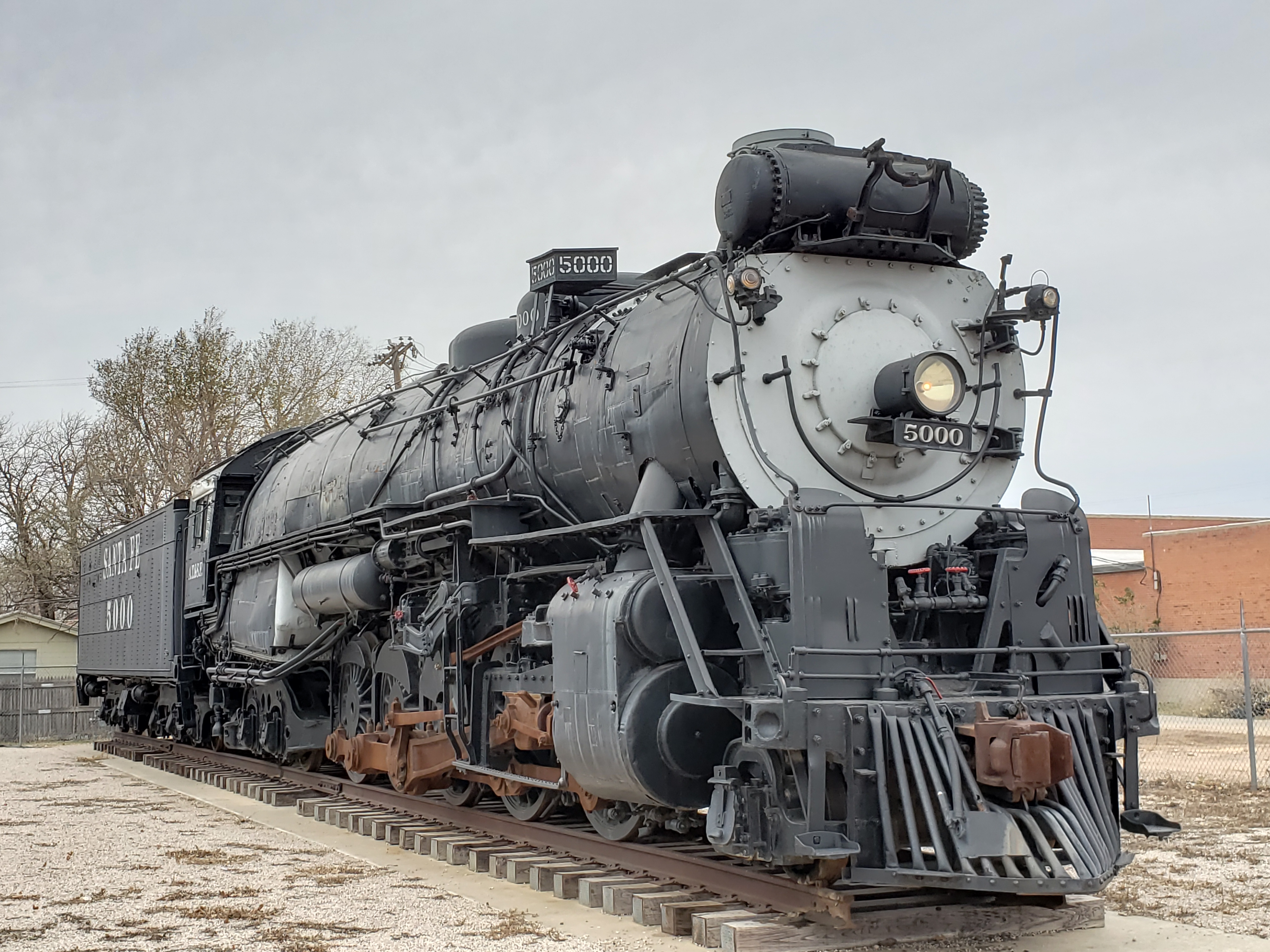
- No. 5000 "Madame Queen" on static display in Amarillo, Texas, November 22, 2018
Type and origin
- Power type: Steam
- Builder: Baldwin Locomotive Works
- Serial number: 61524
- Build date: 1930
- Total produced: 1
- Rebuild date: 1940
Specifications
- Configuration
  - Whyte: 2-10-4
- Gauge: 4 ft 8 1/2 in (1,435 mm)
- Driver dia.: 69 in (1,752.6 mm)
- Wheelbase: 24 ft 6 in (7.47 m) (driving wheelbase)
- Axle load: 76,570 lb (34,700 kg)
- Adhesive weight: 372,000 lb (169,000 kg)
- Loco weight: 502,600 lb (228,000 kg)
- Tender weight: 375,000 lb (170,100 kg)
- Total weight: 877,600 lb (398,100 kg)
- Fuel type: New: Coal; Now: Oil
- Water cap.: 20,000 US gal (76,000 L; 17,000 imp gal)
- Firebox
  - Grate area: 121.7 sq ft (11.31 m^{2})
- Boiler: 104 in (2,600 mm) diameter
- Boiler pressure: 300 psi (2.07 MPa)
- Cylinders: Two, outside
- Cylinder size: 30 in (760 mm) diameter x 34 in (860 mm) stroke
- Valve gear: Walschaerts
- Valve type: Piston valves
- Loco brake: Air
- Train brakes: Air
- Couplers: Knuckle
Performance figures
- Tractive effort: 113,087 lbf (503.04 kN)
- Factor of adh.: 3.29
Career
- Operators: Atchison, Topeka and Santa Fe Railway
- Numbers: ATSF 5000
- Nicknames: Madame Queen
- Retired: April 17, 1957
- Current owner: The City of Amarillo, Texas
- Disposition: On static display
- Atchison, Topeka and Santa Fe Railway Company Depot and Locomotive No. 5000
- U.S. National Register of Historic Places
- U.S. Historic district
- Location within Texas Location within the United States
- Location: 307 S. Grant, Amarillo, Texas
- Coordinates: 35°12′41.04″N 101°49′48.81″W
- Area: 12 acres (4.9 ha)
- Architect: E.A. Harrison
- Architectural style: Mission/Spanish Revival, 5000 Series Steam Locomotive
- NRHP reference No.: 86002189
- Added to NRHP: September 18, 1986

Santa Fe 5000 is a 2-10-4 "Texas" type steam locomotive, it was constructed by Baldwin Locomotive Works in 1930 for the Atchison, Topeka and Santa Fe Railway. No. 5000 was immediately nicknamed the "Madame Queen" and remained a unique member of its own class. It was donated to the City of Amarillo, Texas in 1957. As of 2023, Santa Fe 5000 is maintained by the Railroad Artifact Preservation Society. Santa Fe 5000 is on the National Register of Historic Places.

== Construction ==
The Texas type on the Santa Fe is by design a Berkshire with an additional driving axle, as it was ordered by most railroads. Although Santa Fe 3829 was the first steam locomotive with the 2-10-4 wheel arrangement, Santa Fe 5000 served as the prototype for all further 2-10-4 locomotives used by the railroad.

In 1930, Santa Fe looked at the contemporary heavy-duty motive power policies of other railroads and decided that its own needed substantial reappraisal. Additional locomotives were ordered as a result of this study, including the 5000. Santa Fe 5000 was placed in service between Clovis and Vaughn, New Mexico for observation. The result was that the company had purchased a locomotive which would pull 15% more tonnage in 9% less time, burning 17% less coal per 1000 gross ton-miles than its 3800 series 2-10-2s.

Although the locomotive was a success, the 1930s brought the national depression and Santa Fe adopted a policy of avoiding capital expenditures during this period. By the time the next 2-10-4s were delivered in 1938 they were placed in a different class because of many design refinements. With the various classes of 4-8-4 types, the 2-10-4 type represented the pinnacle of modern heavy-power development on the Santa Fe Railway System.

== Modifications ==
Santa Fe 5000 underwent a few modifications during its service life. It received a larger 'square tender', which required the cab roof to be modified with an area that allowed crew members to pass from the cab to the top of the tender. In 1940 the locomotive was converted from coal to oil fuel.

== Preservation ==
On April 17, 1957, after several years of storage and 1,750,000 miles (2,820,000 km) of service, Santa Fe 5000 was retired and donated to the city of Amarillo, Texas. It was placed on outdoor static display at the Santa Fe station. In August 2005, 5000 was moved by the Railroad Artifact Preservation Society to a new location in Amarillo, 500 SE 2nd Avenue, where it plans to construct a building to house and preserve the locomotive. In July 2016, the city of Amarillo proposed selling the locomotive.

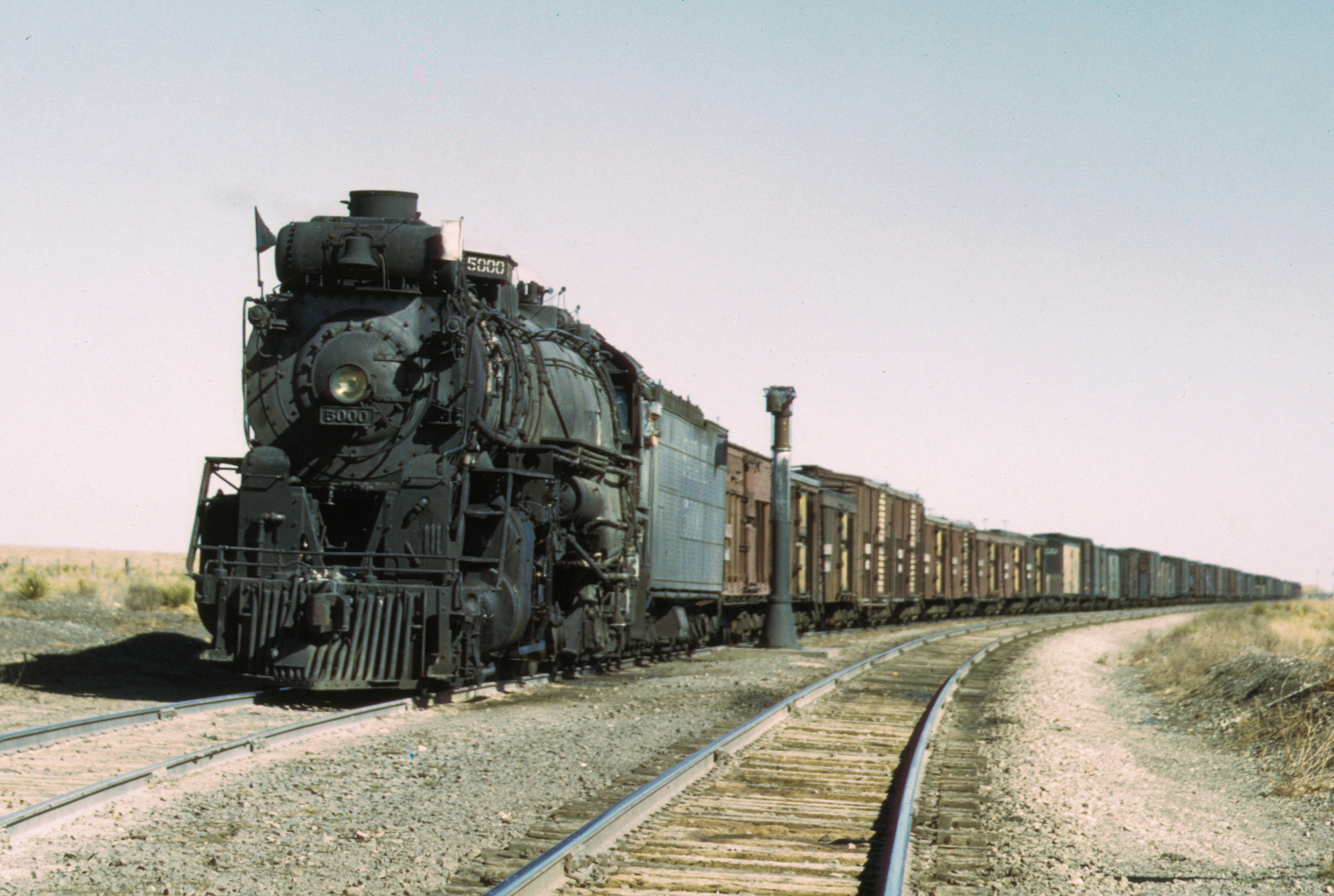
Atchison, Topeka & Santa Fe Railway 2-10-4 steam locomotive No. 5000 "Madame Queen" waiting in a siding to meet an eastbound train in Ricardo, New Mexico, March 1943

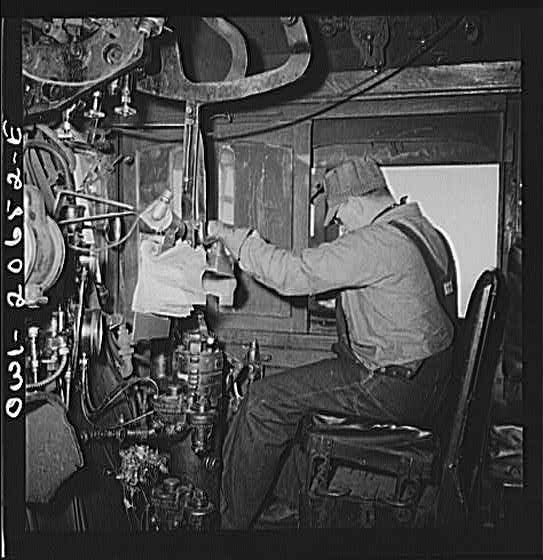
Ricardo, New Mexico. Engineer in his cab about to start the train along the Atchison, Topeka, and Santa Fe Railroad between Clovis and Vaughn, New Mexico.

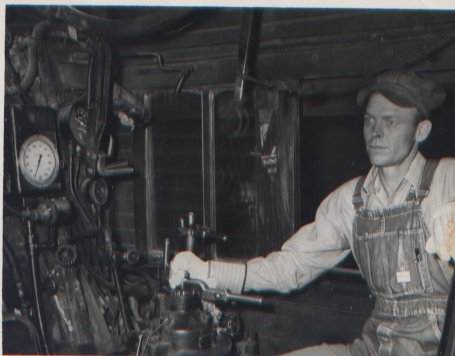
Canadian, Texas. Engineer John Morris Price bringing the Madame Queen back into Amarillo, TX from Canadian, TX in 1950.

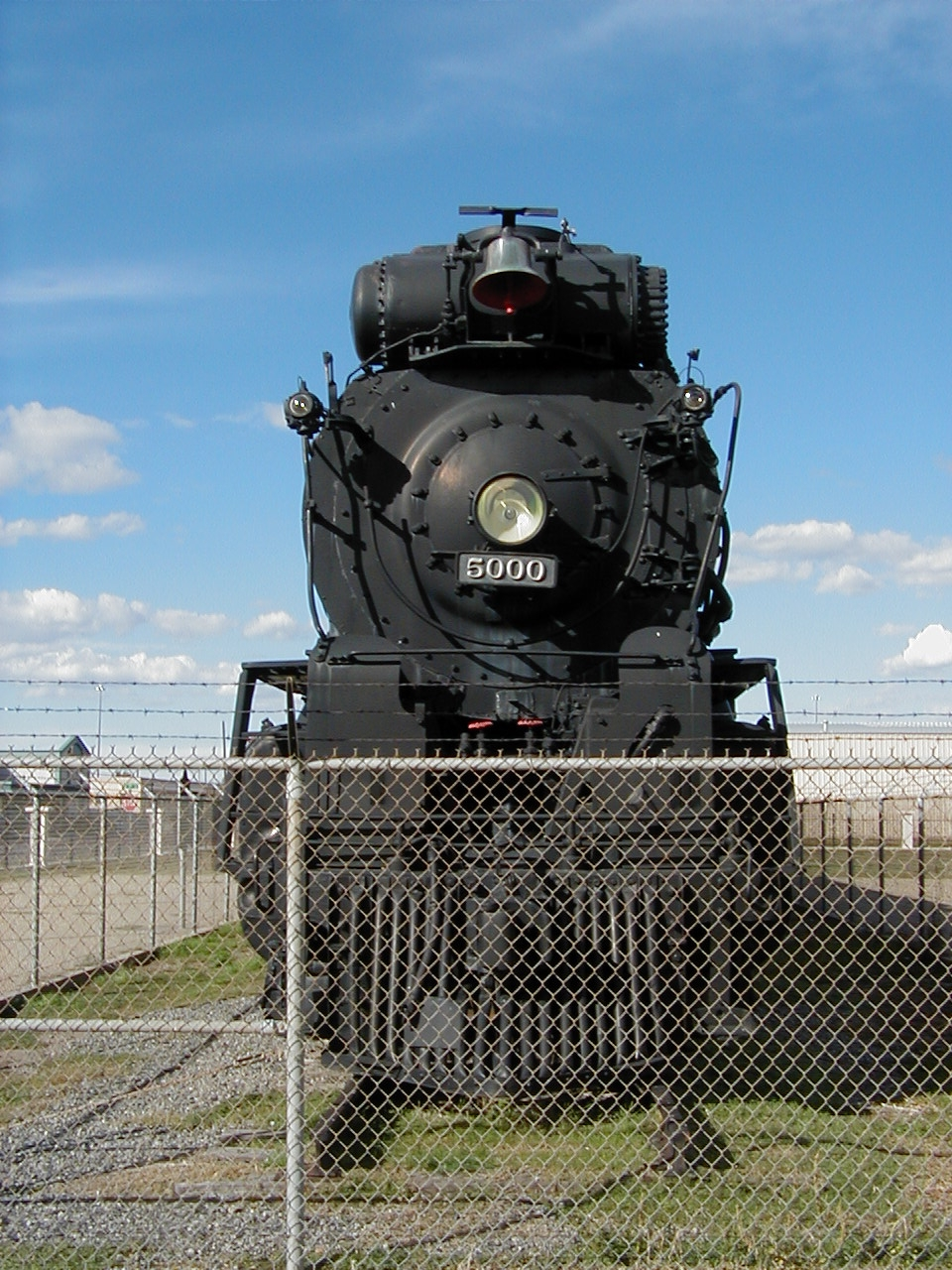
Amarillo, Texas. Front view of Santa Fe 5000 on static display, October 2002.

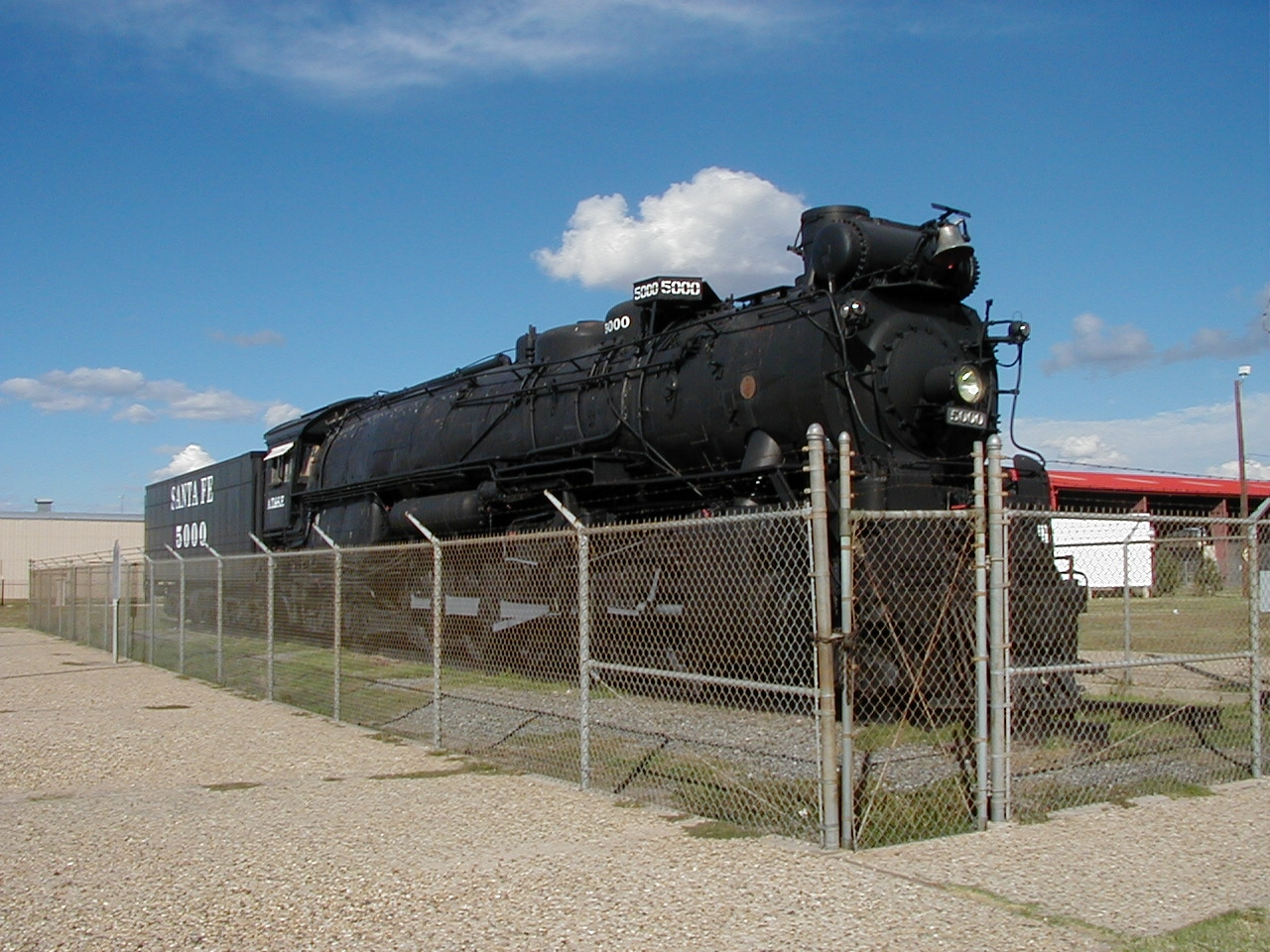
Amarillo, Texas. Side view of Santa Fe 5000 on static display, October 2002.

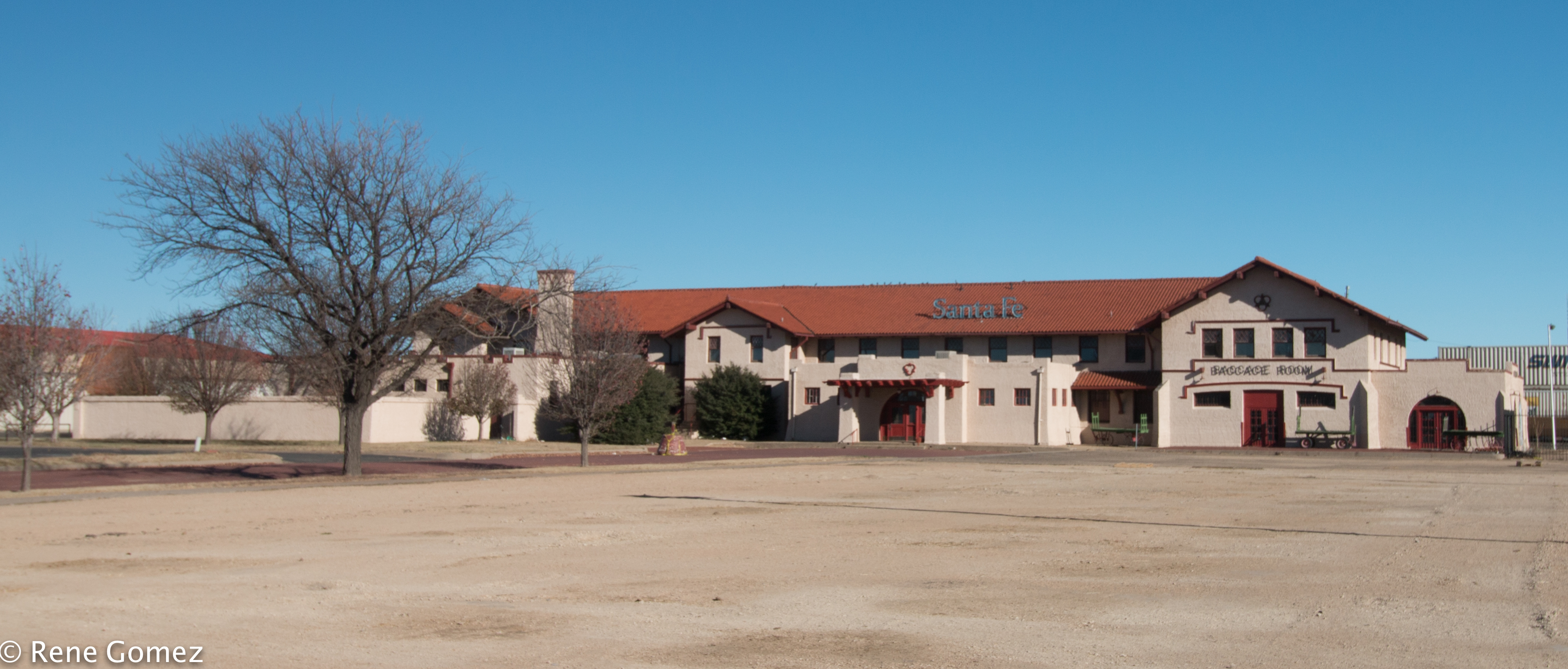
Santa Fe Depot

== See also ==
- National Register of Historic Places listings in Potter County, Texas
