= South African type FT tender =

Steam locomotive tender in South Africa

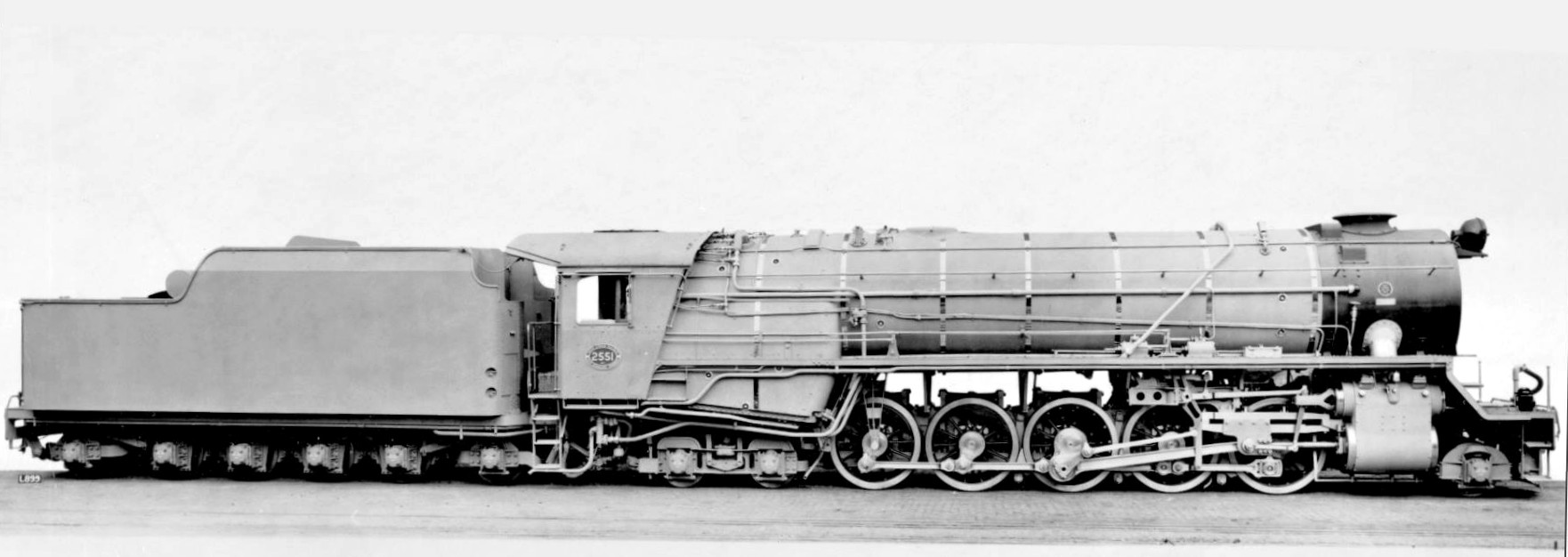
- Type FT tender on Class 21, c. 1937
Type and origin
- Locomotive: Class 21
- Designer: South African Railways (A.G. Watson)
- Builder: North British Locomotive Company
- In service: 1937
Specifications
- Configuration: 2-8-2
- Gauge: 3 ft 6 in (1,067 mm) Cape gauge
- Length: 32 ft 7 7/16 in (9,943 mm)
- Wheel dia.: 34 in (864 mm)
- Wheelbase: 22 ft 3 in (6,782 mm)
  - Rigid: 12 ft 3 in (3,734 mm)
- Axle load: 12 LT 10 cwt (12,700 kg)
  - 1st axle: 7 LT 18 cwt (8,027 kg)
  - 2nd axle: 12 LT 10 cwt (12,700 kg)
  - 3rd axle: 12 LT 10 cwt (12,700 kg)
  - 4th axle: 12 LT 10 cwt (12,700 kg)
  - 5th axle: 12 LT 10 cwt (12,700 kg)
  - 6th axle: 7 LT 18 cwt (8,027 kg)
- Weight empty: 69,122 lb (31,353 kg)
- Weight w/o: 65 LT 16 cwt (66,860 kg)
- Fuel type: Coal
- Fuel cap.: 10 LT (10.2 t)
- Water cap.: 5,587 imp gal (25,400 L)
- Stoking: Mechanical
- Couplers: Drawbar & AAR knuckle
Career
- Operators: South African Railways
- Numbers: SAR 2551

The South African type FT tender was a steam locomotive tender.

A single Type FT tender entered service in 1937, as tender to the sole Class 21 2-10-4 steam locomotive which was placed in service by the South African Railways in that year.

== Manufacturer ==
The Type FT tender was built in 1937 by North British Locomotive Company in Glasgow.

The South African Railways (SAR) placed a single Class 21 steam locomotive in service in 1937. The engine and tender were built to the design of A.G. Watson, Chief Mechanical Engineer of the SAR from 1929 to 1936. After trials, the locomotive was placed in service on the Oosterlijn line from Pretoria to the Eastern Transvaal.

== Characteristics ==
The tender had a coal capacity of 10 long tons (10.2 tonnes), a water capacity of 5,587 imperial gallons (25,400 litres) and a maximum axle load of 12 long tons 10 hundredweight (12,700 kilograms). It had an unusual wheel structure of six pairs of wheels in a 2-8-2 wheel arrangement, with the leading and trailing wheels in Bissel-type pony trucks and the rest of the axles mounted with a rigid wheelbase. Like the leading and trailing wheels of its engine, all tender wheels were fitted with roller bearings. The rationale behind the design was that, if the tender frame could be carried on more points, represented by the rigidly mounted and Bissel wheels, instead of on only two bogie pivot centres, the frame could be made lighter.

The tender was equipped with a mechanical stoker. The water tank was of welded construction and the coal bunker was of the self-trimming design. Each Bissel truck was compensated with its neighbouring two pairs of rigidly mounted wheels. The eight rigidly mounted wheels were fitted with overhead laminated bearing springs, while the spring gear for each pony truck and two adjacent axles were compensated throughout the springing system, constituting two equal groups. Vacuum cylinders, mounted on top of the tank, actuated brake blocks on the rigidly mounted wheels.

The tender's wheel arrangement did not prove to be very successful and, with the exception of the Type JV tender, a similar experimental tender which had been built in the Salt River shops as a prototype test-model of the Type FT in 1936 during the design phase of the Class 21, it was not used again on the SAR. Comparison, in working order, with the Type MR tender showed that the Type FT tender weighed 30,128 pounds (13,666 kilograms) more than the Type MR, while it carried the same amount of coal and only 987 imperial gallons (4,490 litres) more water, a payload difference representing a weight of 9,870 pounds (4,477 kilograms).

It needs to be borne in mind, however, that the Type MR was not equipped with a mechanical stoker, an item which reduced the Type FT's water capacity. On the Type ET tender, for example, the inclusion of a mechanical stoker reduced its water capacity by 380 imperial gallons (1,730 litres) compared to the virtually identical manually stoked Type JT tender, while its empty weight was 1,232 pounds (559 kilograms) more due to the mechanical stoking equipment.

Another characteristic unique to the Types FT and JV tenders was their left sides, where both had a space built-in for the fire-irons and rakes. The stowage space was open at the top, where the upper side of the tender was tied to the top of the coal bunker by four metal straps.

The Types FT and JV tenders were similar in appearance, but not identical, the difference being visible on their left sides when comparing the folded-in upper sides to the right of the fourth strap between tender sides and coal bins. The Type JV was the larger of the two with larger coal and water capacities. It was tested behind a manually-stoked Class 15F locomotive, but it is unclear whether it was used again afterwards.

When the Class 21 engine was scrapped at the Pretoria Shops in 1952, its Type FT tender was allocated to Kroonstad Loco as a spare tender for use on Class 15F locomotives since, at the time, all the Class 15Fs shedded at Kroonstad were fitted with mechanical stokers. The Type FT could easily work coupled to these engines because they used the same type of Watson Standard no. 3B boiler and firebox arranged for mechanical firing as the Class 21. The tender was rarely used, however, since it had a smaller coal and water capacity than the Type JT tender normally fitted to the Class 15F.

== Locomotive ==
Only the sole Class 21 locomotive was delivered new with the Type FT tender, which was numbered 2551 for its engine. An oval number plate, bearing the engine number and tender type, was attached to the rear end of the tender.

== Classification letters ==
Since many tender types are interchangeable between different locomotive classes and types, a tender classification system was adopted by the SAR. The first letter of the tender type indicates the classes of engines to which it can be coupled. The "F_" tender could only be used with the Class 21 locomotive with which it was delivered and with mechanically stoked Class 15F locomotives.

The second letter indicates the tender's water capacity. The "_T" tenders had a capacity of between 5,587 and 6,000 imperial gallons (25,400 and 27,300 litres; 6,710 and 7,210 US gallons).

== Illustration ==
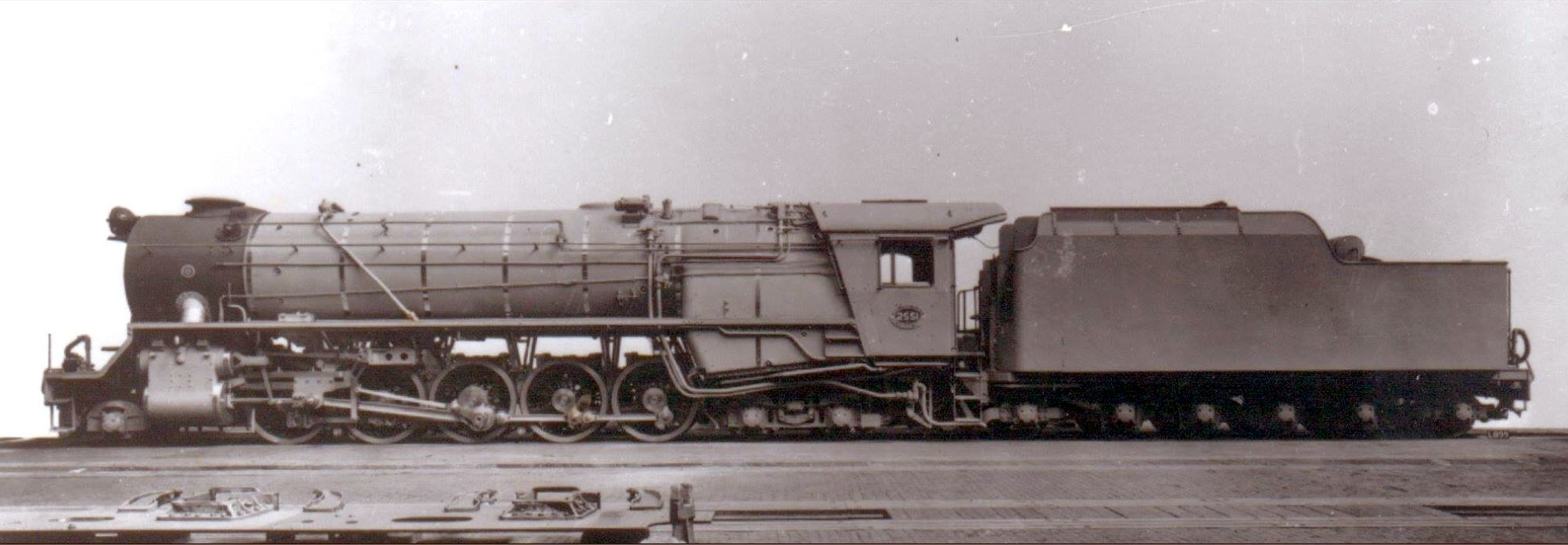
Left side of Class FT tender on the Class 21 locomotive

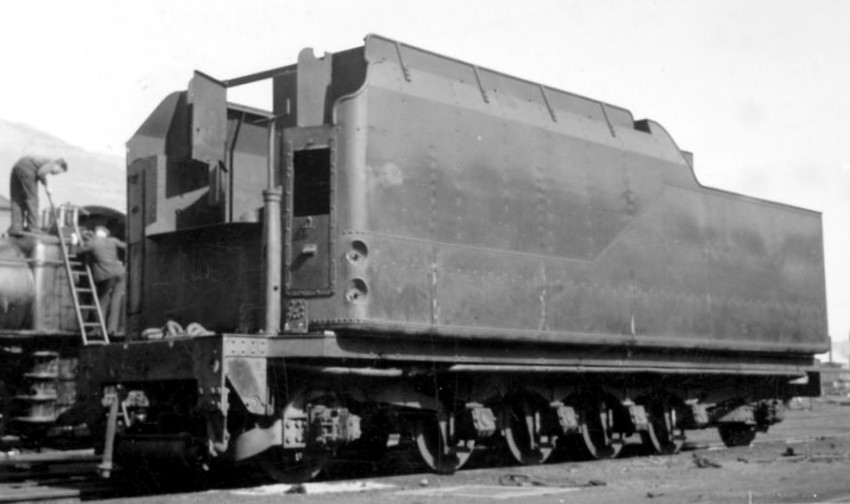
Left side of the longer prototype Type JV tender
