= Hammer blow =

Railroad jargon

In rail terminology, hammer blow or dynamic augment is a vertical force that alternately adds to and subtracts from a steam locomotive's effective weight on the driving wheels. This force, called overbalance, is caused by a design compromise: in order to improve the ride, a locomotive's wheels are unbalanced to offset horizontal reciprocating masses such as connecting rods and pistons. The hammer blow may damage the locomotive and track if the wheel-to-rail force is high enough.

== Principles ==
The addition of extra weights on the wheels reduces the unbalanced reciprocating forces on the locomotive, but causes it to be out of balance, causing vertical hammer blow.

Locomotives were balanced to their individual cases, especially if several of the same design (i.e. a locomotive class) were constructed. The members of each class of locomotive were balanced for their normal operating speed. Between 40% and 50% of the reciprocating weights on each side were balanced by rotating weights in the wheels.

== Causes ==
While the side rods (UK: coupling rods) of a locomotive can be completely balanced by weights on the driving wheels since their motion is completely rotational, the reciprocating motions of the pistons, piston rods, and valve gear cannot be completely balanced in this way. The main rods also cannot be completely balanced by wheel counterweights, since their motions have a greater displacement in the horizontal direction than in the vertical direction. Almost all two-cylinder locomotives have their cranks "quartered" — set at 90° apart — so that the double-acting pistons' four power strokes are evenly distributed around the cycle and there are no "dead spots" (points at which both cylinders are at top or bottom dead center simultaneously).

A four-cylinder locomotive can be completely balanced in the longitudinal and vertical axes, although there are some rocking moments which can be dealt with in the locomotive's suspension and centering; a three-cylinder locomotive can also be better balanced, but a two-cylinder locomotive will surge fore and aft if it is balanced only for rotation. Additional balance weight — "overbalance" — can be added to reduce this, typically enough to "average out" the vibrations by making the remaining forces and moments equal in the vertical and horizontal directions. However, the vertical forces which are added as a result, known technically as hammer blow, can be extremely damaging to the track, and in extreme cases can actually cause the driving wheels to leave the track entirely.

The heavier the reciprocating machinery, the greater these forces are, and the greater a problem this becomes. Except for a short period early in the twentieth century when balanced compound locomotives were tried, American railroads were not interested in locomotives with inside cylinders, so the problem of balance could not be solved by adding more cylinders per coupled wheel set. As locomotives got larger and more powerful, their reciprocating machinery had to get stronger and thus heavier, causing the problems posed by imbalance and hammer blow to become more severe. Higher speeds also increase unbalanced forces, as they rise with the square of the wheel rotational speed.

== Solutions ==
One solution to this was the duplex locomotive, which spread the driving power over multiple sets of pistons, thus greatly reducing hammer blow. Less successful was the triplex locomotive.

The Soviet Union used a different solution to hammer blow with their 2-10-4 (and 2-8-2) locomotive design. The cylinders were placed above the centre driving axle, and most significantly, were of the opposed piston configuration (two pistons 180 degrees phased within the one cylinder). Thus, unlike nearly all steam locomotives, the pistons had rods on both ends which transferred power to the wheels. The idea was to balance the driving forces on the wheels, allowing the counterweights on the wheels to be smaller and reducing hammer blow on the track.

In the United Kingdom, the Government Bridge Stress Committee investigated the impact of hammer blow in the creation of stresses in railway bridges and of the need to balance the motions of inside and outside cylinders. The usage of inside cylinders (which was rare in the USA) results in a more stable locomotive and thus reduced hammer blow. Many European tank engines had inside cylinders to reduce the wear and tear on shunting yard tracks from frequent and heavy use. Outside cylinders are easier to maintain, however, and apparently for many US railroads this was considered more important than other considerations. The maintenance costs associated with the nigh-inaccessible inside cylinders on Union Pacific's 4-12-2 locomotives may have hastened their retirement.

Steam motor based locomotives have smaller and more numerous reciprocating components that require much lighter parts, and are easier to balance well. There are no hammer-blow related problems reported from these designs, but they came about towards a time when railways were moving towards dieselisation.

Steam turbine locomotives lack pistons, valve gear and other fore-aft reciprocating components making it possible to balance the wheels and connecting rods to eliminate hammer blow. Steam turbine locomotives were tried by several companies around the world in the 1930s and 1940s (such as the Pennsylvania Railroad's S2 6-8-6 and the LMS' Turbomotive). Whilst many of these turbine locomotives suffered problems in service (usually excessive fuel consumption and/or poor reliability) they did prove to be free from hammer blow and offered a way of achieving high power outputs and speeds without causing track damage.

== See also ==
- Engine balance § Steam locomotives
