= South African type JV tender =

Steam locomotive tender

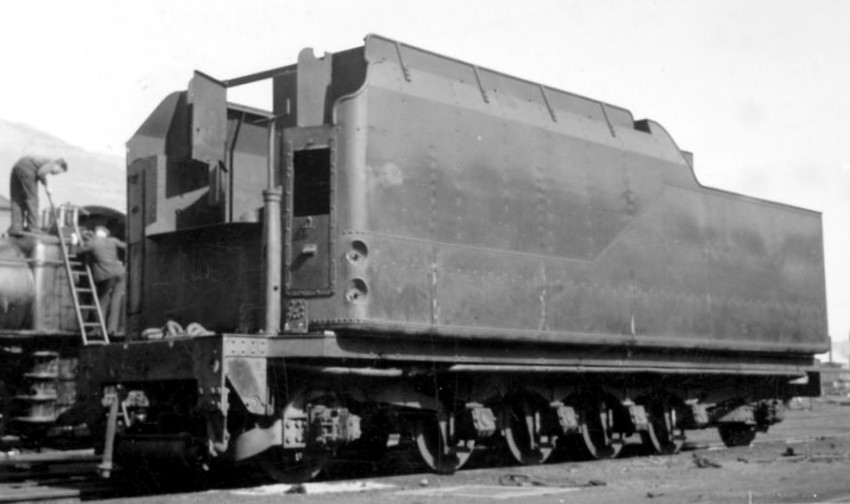
- Experimental Type JV tender, Paardeneiland, c. 1940
Type and origin
- Designer: South African Railways (A.G. Watson)
- Builder: South African Railways
- In service: 1936
Specifications
- Configuration: 2-8-2
- Gauge: 3 ft 6 in (1,067 mm) Cape gauge
- Length: 35 ft 3 7/16 in (10,755 mm)
- Wheel dia.: 34 in (864 mm)
- Wheelbase: 24 ft 11 in (7,595 mm)
  - Rigid: 12 ft 9 in (3,886 mm)
- Axle load: 14 LT 18 cwt (15,140 kg)
  - 1st axle: 10 LT 18 cwt (11,070 kg)
  - 2nd axle: 12 LT 17 cwt (13,060 kg)
  - 3rd axle: 13 LT 15 cwt (13,970 kg)
  - 4th axle: 14 LT 18 cwt (15,140 kg)
  - 5th axle: 13 LT 18 cwt (14,120 kg)
  - 6th axle: 11 LT 14 cwt (11,890 kg)
- Weight empty: 68,620 lb (31,130 kg)
- Weight w/o: 78 LT (79,250 kg)
- Fuel type: Coal
- Fuel cap.: 15 LT (15.2 t)
- Water cap.: 7,250 imp gal (33,000 L)
- Stoking: Manual
- Couplers: Drawbar & AAR knuckle
Career
- Operators: South African Railways
- Numbers: SAR N60

The South African type JV tender was a steam locomotive tender.

A single experimental Type JV tender entered service in 1936 as a prototype test-model of the Type FT tender to the sole Class 21 2-10-4 steam locomotive, which was being designed in that year.

== Manufacturer ==
The Type JV tender was built by the South African Railways (SAR) in its Salt River shops in Cape Town in 1936.

During the design phase of the Class 21 2-10-4 steam locomotive, an experimental tender was built with the same wheel arrangement as that of the Type FT tender which was intended for this new locomotive. The experimental tender was built to the design of A.G. Watson, Chief Mechanical Engineer of the SAR from 1929 to 1936.

== Characteristics ==
The tender had a coal capacity of 15 long tons (15.2 tonnes) and a water capacity of 7,250 imperial gallons (33,000 litres), with a maximum axle load of 14 long tons 18 hundredweight (15,140 kilograms). An unusual characteristic of the tender was its six axles in a 2-8-2 wheel arrangement, with the leading and trailing wheels in Bissel pony trucks and the rest of the axles mounted with a rigid wheelbase.

The rationale behind the design was that, if the tender frame could be carried on more points, represented by the rigidly mounted and Bissel wheels, instead of on only two bogie pivot centres, the frame could be made lighter. The vacuum cylinders which actuated brake blocks on the rigidly mounted wheels were mounted on top of the tank behind the coal bunker since the wheel arrangement left insufficient room to mount them under the frame as usual.

Another characteristic unique to the Types JV and FT tenders was the left side of both tenders, where they had a space built-in for the fire-irons and rakes. The stowage space was open at the top, where the upper side of the tender was tied to the top of the coal bunker by four metal straps.

== Locomotive ==
The tender was numbered N60 and was tested behind a manually-stoked Class 15F locomotive. The "N" number prefix indicates a non-revenue earning vehicle.

== Classification letters ==
Since many tender types are interchangeable between different locomotive classes and types, a tender classification system was adopted by the SAR. The first letter of the tender type indicates the classes of engines to which it can be coupled. The "J_" tenders could be used with the locomotive classes as shown.

- Class 15E.
- Class 15F, if arranged for manual stoking.
- Class 16E.
- Class S1.

Since it was arranged for manual stoking, the Type JV tender was not suitable for use with those Class 15F locomotives which were fitted with mechanical stokers.

The second letter indicates the tender's water capacity. The "_V" tenders had a capacity of between 7,250 and 7,500 imperial gallons (33,000 and 34,100 litres; 8,710 and 9,010 US gallons).
