= National Railroad Museum =

Railroad museum located in Ashwaubenon Bay, Wisconsin

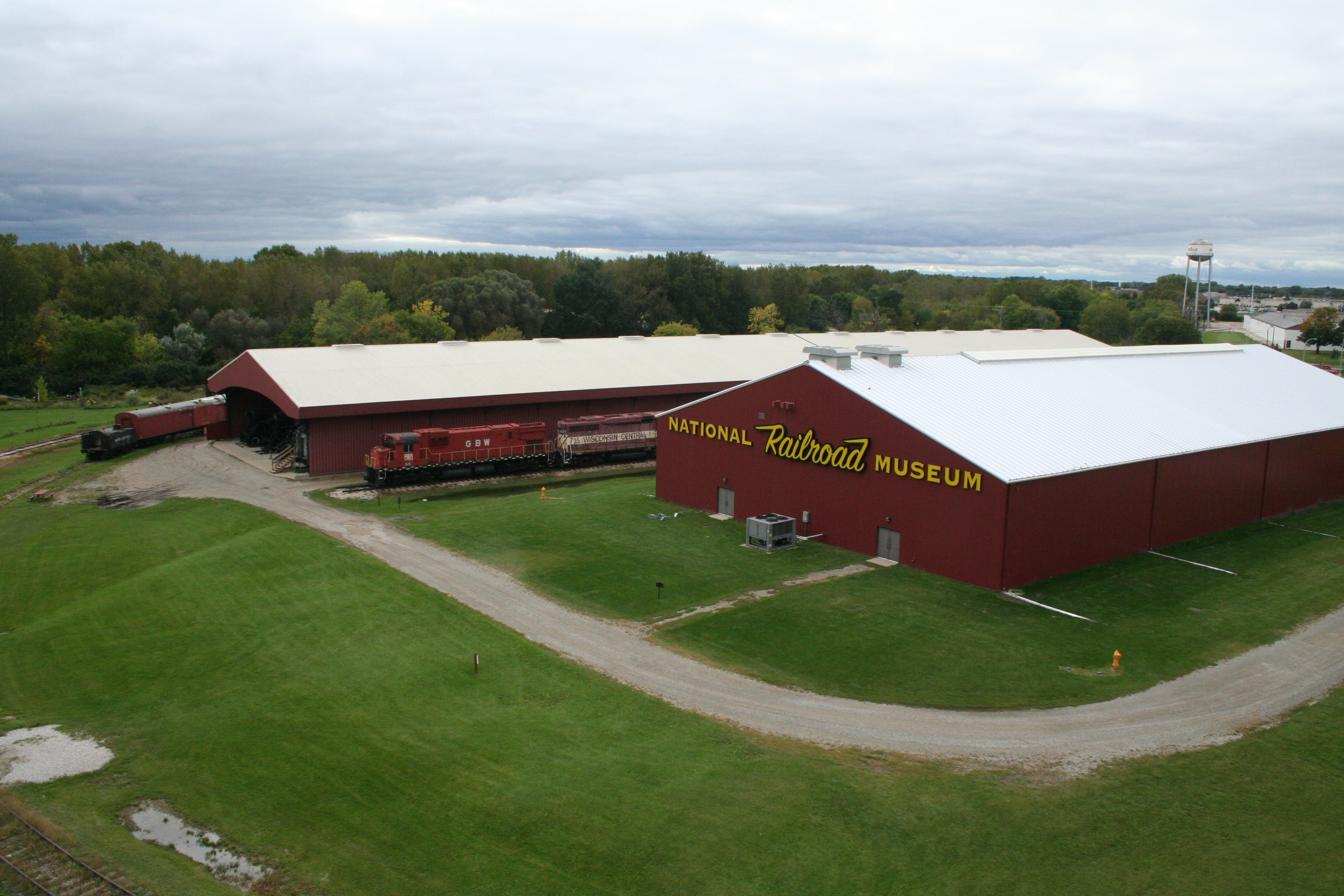
- The Victor McCormick Train Pavilion (left) and Frederick J Lenfestey Center (right) at the National Railroad Museum.
- Established: 1956; 70 years ago
- Location: Ashwaubenon, Wisconsin
- Coordinates: 44°28′59.9″N 88°02′52.8″W
- Type: Railway museum
- CEO: Jacqueline Frank
- Website: nationalrrmuseum.org

The National Railroad Museum (reporting mark NRMX) is a railroad museum located in Ashwaubenon, Wisconsin, United States.

Founded in 1956 by community volunteers, the National Railroad Museum is one of the oldest and largest U.S. institutions dedicated to preserving and interpreting the nation's railroad history. Two years later, a joint resolution of Congress recognized the museum as the National Railroad Museum. The museum has been a nonprofit 501(c)(3) organization since 1958.

Its collection of locomotives and rolling stock spans more than a century. Notable items include an Aerotrain; Union Pacific Big Boy No. 4017, one of the world's largest steam locomotives; and British Railways Class A4 No. 60008 Dwight D Eisenhower (ex-London & North Eastern Railway No. 4496 Golden Shuttle) and train used by the Supreme Allied Commander and his staff in the United Kingdom and continental Europe during World War II.

The Frederick J. Lenfesty Center, an enclosed and climate-controlled structure, built in 2001, houses several of the unique and rarer locomotives and cars. A museum building houses railroad artifacts, an archive, and photography gallery. A standard gauge track rings the grounds. An 80-foot (24 m) wooden observation tower has views of the Fox River and Green Bay.

The museum hosted an annual Day Out with Thomas event until 2019, in which Thomas the Tank Engine pulled young friends past the exhibited rolling stock. In October, it hosts "Terror on the Fox", the Green Bay Preble Optimist Club's haunted attraction that includes "haunted" train rides after dark.

== Expansion ==
A $17 million project expanded the indoor display area and added a plaza along the river. Opened on September 20, 2025, it used $7 million in American Rescue Plan Act funds contributed by the state of Wisconsin.

== Rolling stock ==
=== Steam Locomotives ===
Locomotive details
Railroad	Class	Road number	Notes	Image
Atchison, Topeka and Santa Fe Railway	5011 class (2-10-4)	5017	Built by Baldwin in July 1944, 5017 is the museum's second largest locomotive, after the Big Boy, and is the only oil-burning steam locomotive in the museum's collection. 5017 was donated December 27, 1959 by the Santa Fe Railroad President, Ernest S. Marsh. It is currently sitting in the Victor McCormick Train Pavilion.	
Chesapeake and Ohio Railway	K-4 class 2–8–4	2736	Built in 1944 by Alco, 2736 is one of 12 preserved C&O K-4s. 2736 was donated July 7, 1961 by the C&O. It is currently sitting in the Victor McCormick Train Pavilion.	
Lake Superior and Ishpeming Railroad	SC-4 2-8-0 Consolidation	24	Built in 1910 by Alco, 24 is the oldest locomotive in the museum's collection and one of the few steam locomotives to have operated there. No. 24 was donated in May 1962 by the LS&I and pulled train rides for the museum until October 1972 when its side rods were found to be worn out. It is currently sitting in the Victor McCormick Train Pavilion.	
British Rail	A4 4-6-2	60008 Dwight D. Eisenhower	Built in 1937 at Doncaster Works, 60008 is the only British passenger locomotive in the United States, and one of two A4s displayed in North America; the other being 4489 Dominion of Canada. In 2012, it was temporarily shipped back to England for restoration and to be displayed alongside the other five A4s in an event known as "The Great Gathering". It returned to Green Bay in 2014. Eisenhower was donated April 27, 1964 by British Railways and arrived the following month. It is currently preserved in the climate controlled Frederick J. Lenfesty Center.	
Duluth, Missabe and Iron Range Railway	E-1 class 2–10–2	506	Built in 1917 by Alco, 506 is the first of ten E1 Class locomotives built for the Duluth Missabe & Northern. No. 506 was in service with the DM&IR until 1962 and was donated to the museum the same year. It is the only preserved member of its class. The 506 was donated in May 1962 by the DM&IRR. It is currently sitting in the Victor McCormick Train Pavilion.	
Ely-Thomas Lumber Co.	Shay	5	Built by Lima in 1917, 5 is the only narrow gauge locomotive at the museum, running on 3 ft gauge track. The 5 was donated by Mr. George Bantha Jr. in July 1972. It is currently sitting largely dissassembled on a flatcar in the Victor McCormick Train Pavilion.	
Pullman Company	0-4-0ST	29	Built by Alco in 1923, 29 (previously known as the Brillion Pioneer) is one of the few steam locomotives to have operated at the museum. It pulled trains until it was banned by the City of Green Bay due to a chromium-lined chimney, which created toxic fumes. The 29 was donated in August 1961 by Mr. and Mrs. Harold Fuller. It is currently preserved in the climate controlled Frederick J. Lenfesty Center.	
Minneapolis, St. Paul and Sault Ste. Marie Railroad (Soo Line)	H-23 class (4-6-2)	2718	Built by Alco in May 1924, 2718 was the first piece to ever arrive at the museum. While technically obtained after the 261, it arrived earlier in the day than the 261. For the first few years of its time at the museum, the 2718 pulled excursion trains on the Soo Line's mainline with sister locomotive 2719. It was formerly retired in the early 60s. The 2718 was donated by the Soo Line on March 10, 1958, and arrived at the museum later that year. It is currently sitting in the Victor McCormick Train Pavilion.	
Sumter & Choctaw Railway	2-8-2	102	Built in June 1924 by Baldwin, 102 is the only steam locomotive that still traverses the museum's working loop. While it arrived at the museum with a cracked boiler and has never steamed there, in 1988 the Green Bay and Western Railroad's Norwood shops built a faux tender for it using parts for a GE 45 ton diesel switcher. It is normally used for special events as the tender is underpowered and prone to overheating. The 102 was donated June 5, 1962 by the Marathon Paper Division of the American Can Co. It is currently sitting in the Victor McCormick Train Pavilion and its original tender sits outside, behind the building.	
United States Army	10-36E 2-8-0	101	Built by Baldwin sometime between 1916 and 1918, the 101 is the last example of its class in preservation. After serving the United States Army in country during the first and second world wars, the 101 was shipped to Korea in 1951 to fight in the Korean War. While in Korea, it became property of the Republic of Korea and during this time its cab was blown up. It was discovered by Col. George Simpson (who later became museum director) and reconstructed by Army Transportation troops. The 101 was donated in 1958 by President Sygman Rhee of the Republic of Korea. It is currently preserved in the climate controlled Frederick J. Lenfesty Center.	
Union Pacific Railroad	4000 class "Big Boy" 4-8-8-4	4017	Built by Alco in December 1944, Big Boy 4017 is one of the eight remaining Big Boy type locomotives. An impromptu attempt to bring the locomotive to steam in 1970 was reportedly attempted by visiting rail crew from the Flying Scotsman, but was aborted after 20 tons of coal failed to heat the boiler enough to produce steam. The 4017 is the only Big Boy with a tender (from Big Boy 4023) from the 1944 order of Big Boys, whose tenders held a larger fuel capacity. The 4017 was donated in July 1961 by Chairman of the Union Pacific Railroad, E. Rolland Harriman (for whom 4017 was once named).	

=== Diesel locomotives ===
Locomotive details
Railroad	Model	Road number	Notes	Image
Wisconsin Central Ltd. (Ex - Fox River Valley Railroad)	EMD SD24	2402 (CBQ 510)	Ex-CBQ, previously restored back to its Fox River Valley Railroad appearance.	
Chicago, Milwaukee, St. Paul and Pacific Railroad (Milwaukee Road)	FM H-10-44	767		
Georgia Pacific Railway	Alco S-2	73 (Ex - 63–146)	EX-SBRR, Currently painted in Great Northern Orange and Green numbered 11 though it was never operated by GN	
Chicago, Rock Island and Pacific Railroad	General Motors Aerotrain	Trainset 2	Comes with the main engine and two cars. One of only two surviving trainsets	
Green Bay and Western Railroad	Alco C430	315		
Manistique and Lake Superior Railroad (Later Ann Arbor Railroad)	Alco S-3	10		
Minneapolis and St. Louis Railway	EMD NW1	D538		
Wisconsin Central Ltd.	EMD GP30	715	Ex-SOO	
Southern Pacific Transportation Company	ALCO S-6	1201 (Currently painted as GBW 106)	Operational, mainly used for excursion runs around the museum property	
United States Army	Whitcombe 44-ton switcher	106		
United States Army	ALCO RSD-1	8651		
Canadian National Railway	EMD E9	103	Donated by Canadian National Railway 2/2024	
Wisconsin Central Ltd.	EMD SW1500	1563	Donated by Canadian National Railway on 11/13/2019	

=== Electric locomotives ===
Locomotive details
Railroad	Class	Road number	Notes	Image
Pennsylvania Railroad	GG1	4890	PRR GG1 4890 at NRM, Green Bay, Wi in 2004.	

=== Passenger cars ===
Passenger cars details
Railroad	Type	Road number	Notes	Image
Atlantic Coast Line Railroad	Dining car	Dothan		
Chicago and North Western Transportation Company	Bi-Level passenger car	32		
Chicago and North Western Transportation Company	Combination Baggage/Passenger car	7411		
Chicago and North Western Transportation Company	Hospital Service Car	"Joseph Lister"		
Chicago, Burlington and Quincy Railroad	Observation car	300 "Silver Spirit"	This observation car once served the Burlington Route, and has been recently restored. It is only used for certain events and is displayed outdoors.	
Chicago, Burlington and Quincy Railroad	Seven duplex bedroom, four section, three double bedroom, one compartment sleeping car	1269 "Poplar River" (ex GN - same name and number)	This train car was used on the Empire Builder.	
Chicago, Burlington and Quincy Railroad	Railway post office car	2330		
Chicago, Burlington and Quincy Railroad	Railway Express Agency car	1580		
Green Bay and Western Railroad	Combination Mail/Baggage/Express car	21 (ex passenger coach 52)		
Lake Superior and Ishpeming Railroad	Passenger car	62		
Lake Superior and Ishpeming Railroad	Combination Baggage/Passenger car	63		
London and North Eastern Railway	LNER Teak Sleeper Dwight D. Eisenhower	1591	From Dwight D. Eisenhower's command train, and is coupled behind the locomotive.	
London and North Eastern Railway	LNER Teak Sleeper Dwight D. Eisenhower	1592	From Dwight D. Eisenhower's command train, and is coupled behind the locomotive (currently coated in armor plating)	
Pullman Company	Sleeping car	Pullman 8667 "Lake Mitchell"		
Reading Company		X	Used as part of Terror on the Fox, a train ride during Halloween time.	
Reading Company		Y	Used as part of Terror on the Fox.	
Reading Company		Y	Currently painted as NRM "Josephine".	
Tennessee Central Railway	Business car	(Monon) 100		
Union Pacific Railroad	Astra Dome diner	8003	Used on the City of Los Angeles (currently undergoing restoration in museum shops)	

=== Freight cars ===
Freight cars details
Railroad	Type	Road number	Notes	Image
Akron, Canton and Youngstown Railroad	Outside braced boxcar	3011		
American Cyanamid	Covered hopper	134		
Armour and Company	Refrigerator car	4408		
Atchison, Topeka and Santa Fe Railway	Flatcar	206983		
Union Refrigerated Transit Company	Refrigerator car	72733	leased to Black Hills Packing Company	
Illinois Central Gulf Railroad	Flatcar	910302		
Menasha Wooden Ware Company	Boxcar	242	This car is a replica	
Minneapolis, St. Paul and Sault Ste. Marie Railroad	Ore hopper car	80374		
Swift Refrigerator Line	Wooden refrigerator car	5156		
Standard Oil	Single-dome tank car	9758		
North American Car Company	Double door boxcar	50143		
North American Car Company	Covered hopper	30133		
PLM Railway	Forty-and-eights boxcar		From Merci Train	
Richter Vinegar Company	Vinegar tank car	20		
TTX Company	TOFC-service flatcar	970837		
Canadian National	Boxcar	414266	Donated to museum by Canadian National Railway	

=== Maintenance of way cars ===
Railroad	Type	Road number	Image
Burlington Northern Railroad	Jordan spreader	973127	
Chicago, Burlington and Quincy Railroad	Dynamometer car	30	
Escanaba and Lake Superior Railroad	Flange plow	100	
Wisconsin Central Railway, subsidiary of the Minneapolis, St. Paul and Sault Ste. Marie Railroad	Wrecking crane	W-1	
Minneapolis, St. Paul and Sault Ste. Marie Railroad	Wrecking crane idler car	X-	

=== Cabooses ===
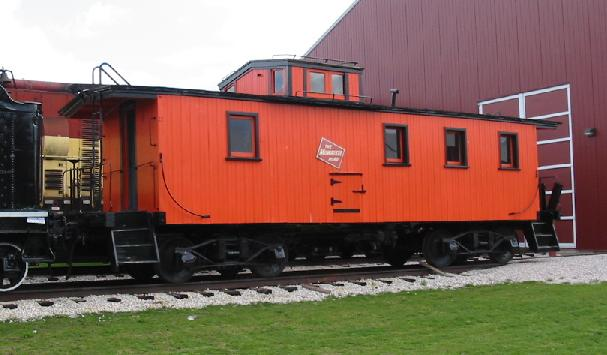
Kickapoo Valley and Western cupola caboose painted in the Milwaukee Road scheme

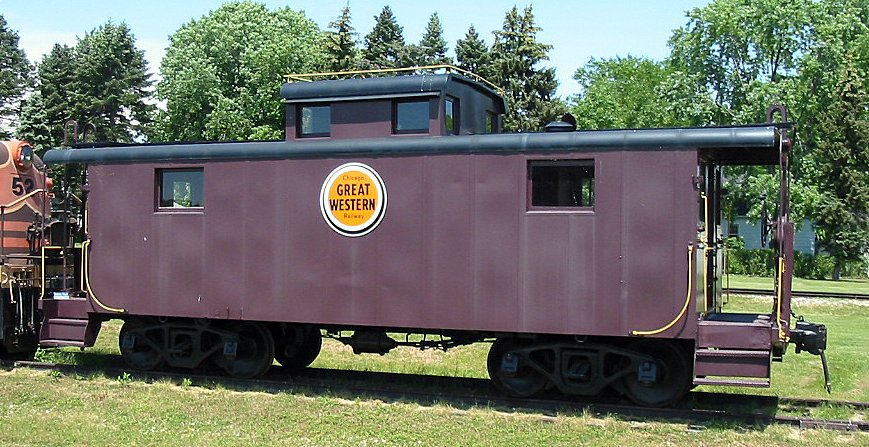
Chicago Great Western Railroad cupola caboose

Caboose details
Railroad	Type	Road number	Notes	Image
Ahnapee and Western Railway	Bay window caboose	33		
Chicago Great Western Railway	Cupola caboose	622		
Chicago and North Western Transportation Company	Bay window caboose	11217		
Illinois Central Railroad	Wide vision caboose	199488		
(Ex Kickapoo Valley and Northern) Milwaukee Road	Caboose	2		

=== Other equipment ===
Railroad	Type	Road number
Anheuser-Busch	Plymouth 15 Tonner	X
Chicago, Burlington and Quincy Railroad		208351
Kohler Co.	Trackmobile	X
Schneider National	Semi-trailer	A508407 (Located on TTX Company TTWX 970837)

== Other collections ==
The museum's archives hold corporate records and documents, annual reports, maps, mechanical and engineering drawings, oral histories, and ephemera. The holdings represent various railroad companies, labor unions, and fraternal organizations.

Its library holds works on the social, economic, political, and cultural aspects of U.S. railroading history.

The National Railroad Museum holds over 5,000 artifacts, including textiles, uniforms, tools and personal items.

Its photograph collection includes 15,000 photographic prints, slides, and film negatives of U.S. railroading since 1890.

=== Bauer Drum Head Gallery ===
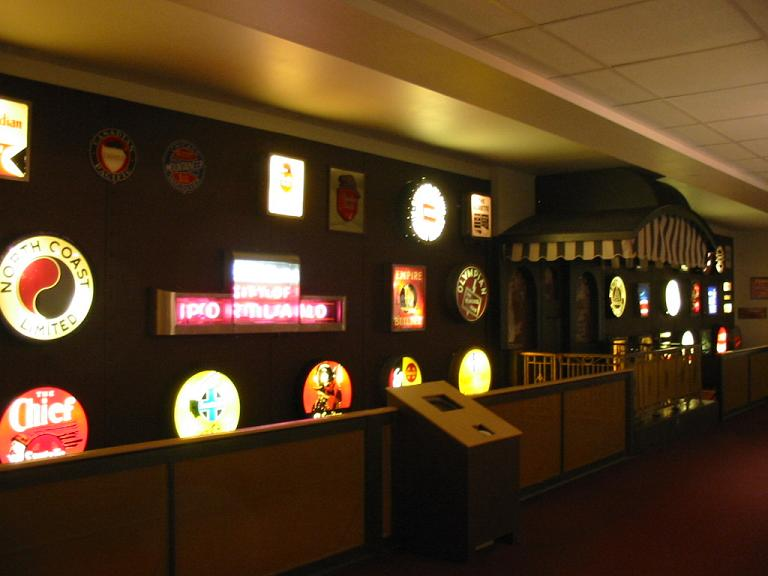
The Bauer Drumhead Collection. These drumheads were saved from scrapped locomotives and other railroading equipment.

In 1999, Frederick Bauer donated his collection of over three dozen drumheads to the museum. Drumheads are one of the rarest railroading memorabilia. When train cars were removed from service many of these were scrapped along with the cars they were on. The gallery features touchscreen displays with narration to provide more information on the route symbolized on the drumhead.

== Capital campaign ==
As of 2019, the museum was working to raise money to build a roundhouse to surround its current buildings (except the train station) to shelter from the weather the locomotives and cars displayed in the open pavilion.

== See also ==
- List of heritage railroads in the United States
