= List of ticker-tape parades in New York City =

New York City based ticket tape parade listing

Since 1886, New York City has honored politicians, generals, organizations, military veterans, athletes, and others with ticker-tape parades. Parades are traditionally held along a section of Broadway, known as the "Canyon of Heroes", from Battery Park to New York City Hall. Beginning in the early 2000s, each of the ticker-tape parades has been commemorated by the Alliance for Downtown New York with a granite strip located on the sidewalks along the parade route, which is inscribed with the date of the parade and a brief description. The eight-inch-wide (20 cm) and three-inch-deep (7.6 cm) granite strips have two-inch (5.1 cm) stainless steel letters; markers have been installed for over 200 parades.

== 1880s ==
- 1886
  - October 28 – Statue of Liberty dedication (impromptu).
- 1889
  - April 29 – Centennial of George Washington's inauguration as first president of the United States

== 1890s ==
- 1899
  - September 30 – Admiral George Dewey, following return from Manila.

== 1910s ==
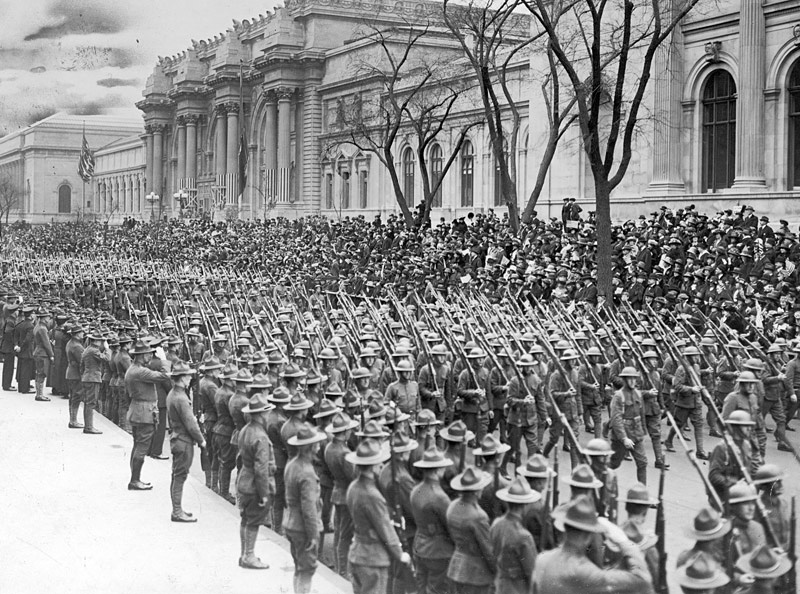
Returning Home, New York Times, 1919

- 1910
  - June 18 – Theodore Roosevelt, following return from his African expedition.
- 1912
  - August 24 – U.S. Olympic Games athletes (Stockholm, Sweden).
- 1919
  - September 8 – General John J. Pershing, commander of American Expeditionary Force
  - October 3 – King Albert and Queen Elisabeth of Belgium
  - November 18 – Edward Albert, Prince of Wales.

== 1920s ==
- 1921
  - October 19 – General Armando Diaz, Italian commander.
  - October 28 – Ferdinand Foch, Marshal of France.
- 1922
  - April 24 – Joseph Joffre, Marshal of France.
  - November 18 – Georges Clemenceau, former premier of France.
- 1923
  - October 5 – David Lloyd George, former prime minister of the United Kingdom.
- 1924
  - August 6 – U.S. Olympic athletes (Paris, Chamonix)
- 1925
  - October 21 – Captain Paul C. Grening and the crew of the SS President Harding for heroic sea rescue.
- 1926
  - February 16 – Captain George Fried and the crew of the SS President Roosevelt for heroic sea rescue.
  - May 27 – Crown Prince Gustaf Adolf and Crown Princess Louise of Sweden
  - June 23 – Commander Richard Byrd and Floyd Bennett, flight over the North Pole
  - July 2 – Bobby Jones, winner of the British Open golf tournament
  - August 27 – Gertrude Ederle, first woman to swim the English Channel
  - September 10 – Amelia Gade Corson, first mother and second woman to swim the English Channel
  - October 18 – Queen Marie of Romania.
- 1927
  - June 13 – Charles Lindbergh, following solo transatlantic flight.
  - July 18 – "Double" parade for Commander Richard Byrd and the crew of the America; and for Clarence Chamberlin and Charles A. Levine following separate transatlantic flights.
  - November 11 – Ruth Elder and George W. Haldeman following flight from New York City to the Azores.
- 1928
  - January 20 – W. T. Cosgrave, President of the Executive Council of the Irish Free State.
  - April 25 – Hermann Köhl, Major James Fitzmaurice, and Baron von Hünefeld following first westward transatlantic flight
  - August 22 – U.S. Olympic athletes.
  - May 4 – Prince Ludovico Spada Potenziani, governor of Rome
  - July 6 – Amelia Earhart, Wilmer Stultz, and Louis E. Gordon, following their transatlantic flight
  - September 20 – Aimé Tschiffely, Swiss-Argentine horse rider from Buenos Aires to New York
  - October 16 – Hugo Eckener and the crew of the Graf Zeppelin
- 1929
  - January 28 – Captain George Fried and the crew of the America for rescue of the Italian freighter Florida
  - August 30 – Hugo Eckener and the crew of the Graf Zeppelin after round the world trip
  - October 4 – James Ramsay MacDonald, prime minister of the United Kingdom

== 1930s ==
- 1930
  - May 26 – Marquis Jacques de Dampierre, descendant of General Lafayette
  - June 11 – Júlio Prestes, president-elect of Brazil.
  - June 18 – Rear Admiral Richard Byrd following expedition to Antarctica.
  - July 2 – Bobby Jones, winner of the British Amateur and British Open golf tournaments.
  - September 4 – Captain Dieudonne Coste and Maurice Bellonte following flight from Paris to New York City.
- 1931
  - July 2 – Wiley Post and Harold Gatty following round-the-world flight.
  - September 2 – Olin Stephens Jr. and the crew of Dorade, winners of a transatlantic yacht race from Newport, R.I., to Plymouth, England
  - October 22 – Pierre Laval, Prime Minister of France.
  - October 26 – Philippe Pétain, Marshal of France.
  - November 30 – Dino Grandi, Foreign Minister of Italy
- 1932
  - June 20 – Amelia Earhart following transatlantic flight.
- 1933
  - July 21 – Air Marshal Italo Balbo and crew for flight from Rome to Chicago in 25 Italian seaplanes.
  - July 26 – Wiley Post following eight-day round-the-world flight.
  - August 1 – Amy Johnson and her husband Jim Mollison following westward transatlantic flight, from Wales to Connecticut.
- 1936
  - September 3 – Jesse Owens following winning four gold medals in the 1936 Summer Olympics.
- 1938
  - July 15 – Howard Hughes, following three-day flight around the world.
  - August 5 – Douglas "Wrong Way" Corrigan following flight from New York City to Ireland (he was scheduled to fly to California).
- 1939
  - April 27 – Crown Prince Olav and Crown Princess Märtha of Norway.
  - May 1 – Rear Admiral Alfred W. Johnson, commander of the Atlantic Squadron.

== 1940s ==
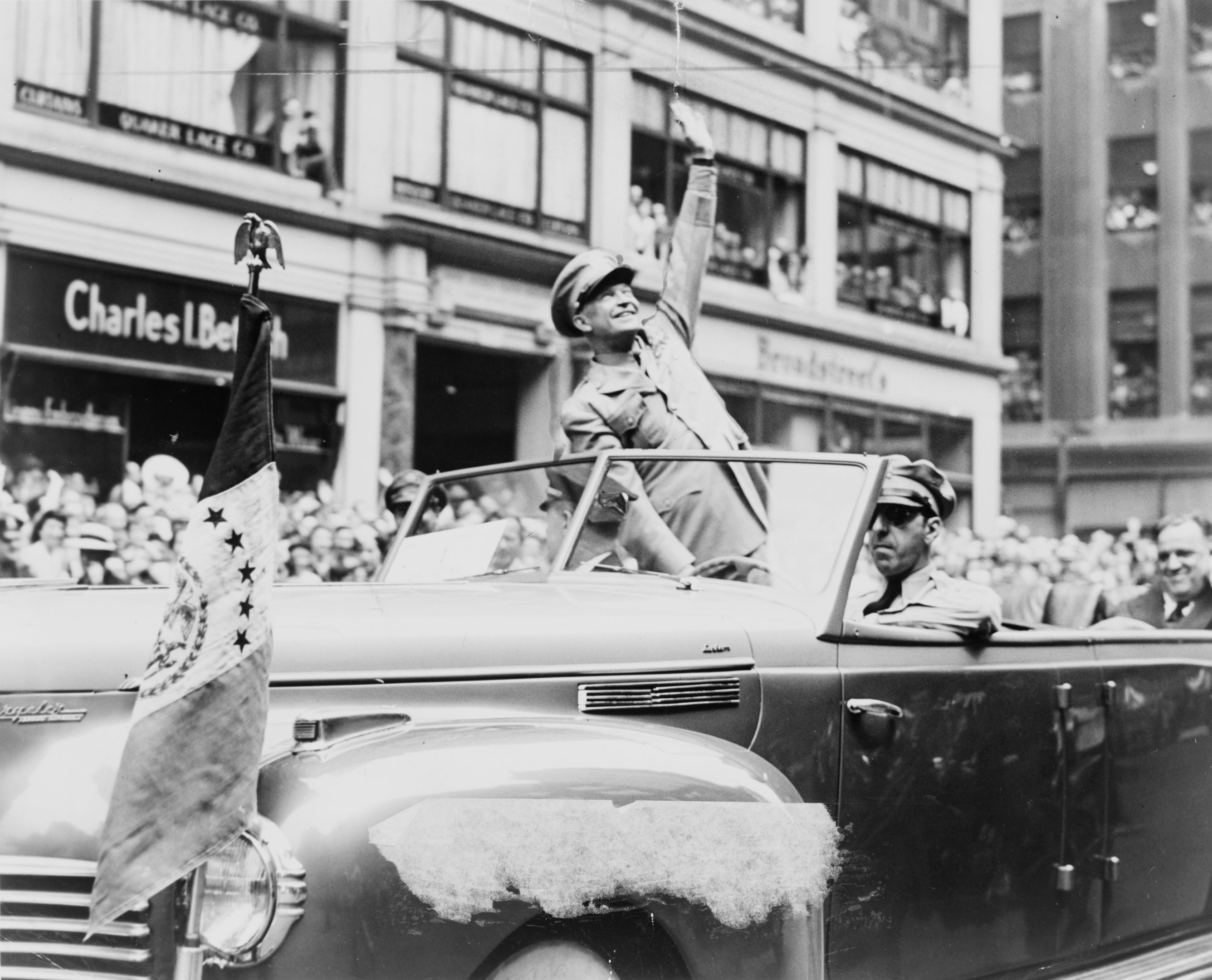
Dwight Eisenhower waves to crowd in 1945

- 1945
  - June 19 – General Dwight Eisenhower, commander of the Allied Expeditionary Forces.
  - August 27 – General Charles de Gaulle, interim president of France.
  - September 14 – General Jonathan Wainwright, hero of Corregidor.
  - October 9 – Fleet Admiral Chester Nimitz.
  - October 27 – President Harry S. Truman.
  - December 14 – Fleet Admiral William F. Halsey.
- 1946
  - January 12 – New York City Victory Parade of 1946: 82nd Airborne Division (United States) James M. Gavin New York native. Chosen as the All American Division to represent the Army and the end of WWII.
  - March 14 – Winston Churchill, former prime minister of the United Kingdom
  - October 23 – Delegates to the first plenary session of the United Nations General Assembly.
- 1947
  - January 13 – Alcide De Gasperi, premier of Italy.
  - February 7 – Viscount Harold Alexander of Tunis, governor general of Canada
  - May 2 – Miguel Alemán Valdés, president of Mexico
  - November 5 - Crew of Warship Georges Leygues for bringing rare French tapestries to exhibit at the Metropolitan Museum of Art
  - November 18 – U.S.-to-Europe "Friendship Train" bearing gifts and supplies.
- 1948
  - March 9 – Éamon de Valera, former Taoiseach of the Republic of Ireland.
  - July 7 – Rómulo Gallegos, president of Venezuela
- 1949
  - February 3 – France-to-U.S. Merci Train bearing gifts in appreciation of the "Friendship Train"
  - May 19 – General Lucius D. Clay, military governor of Germany.
  - May 23 – Eurico Gaspar Dutra, president of Brazil.
  - August 11 – Elpidio Quirino, president of the Philippines
  - August 19 – Connie Mack, on his fiftieth anniversary as manager of the Philadelphia Athletics.
  - September 17 – Forty-eight European journalists on "American discovery" flight around United States.
  - October 4 – American Legion Drum and Bugle Corps national championship.
  - October 17 – Jawaharlal Nehru, prime minister of India.
  - October 18 – Ralph Bunche, United Nations mediator

== 1950s ==
- 1950
  - April 17 – Gabriel González Videla, president of Chile.
  - April 28 – Admiral Thomas C. Kinkaid.
  - May 8 – Liaquat Ali Khan, Prime Minister of Pakistan.
  - August 4 – Robert Gordon Menzies, prime minister of Australia.
  - August 22 – Lt. General Clarence R. Huebner
  - August 31 – William O'Dwyer, recently resigned New York City mayor
- 1951
  - April 3 – Vincent Auriol, president of France
  - April 20 – General of the Army Douglas MacArthur
  - May 9 – David Ben-Gurion, prime minister of Israel
  - May 24 – U.S. 4th Infantry Division 8th Regimental Combat Team, first troops sent overseas in support of the North Atlantic Treaty Organization
  - June 25 – Galo Plaza Lasso, president of Ecuador
  - September 17 – Sir Denys Lowson, Lord Mayor of the City of London.
  - September 28 – Alcide De Gasperi, prime minister of Italy.
  - October 29 – United Nations servicemen wounded in Korea.
  - November 13 – Women of the armed forces
- 1952
  - January 17 – Captain Henrik Kurt Carlsen, following rescue of the crew of the Flying Enterprise
  - April 7 – Queen Juliana and Prince Bernhard of the Netherlands.
  - July 7 – U.S. Olympic team.
  - July 18 – Commodore Harry Manning and the crew of the United States following new speed record crossing the Atlantic.
  - December 18 – Lt. General Willis D. Crittenberger. World War II combat commander in Italy and retiring commander of US First Army headquartered at Fort Jay, Governors Island, New York.
- 1953
  - January 30 – Vice Admiral Walter S. DeLany, Commander of the Navy's Eastern Sea Frontier and the Atlantic Reserve Fleet
  - April 3 – Metropolitan New York Combat Contingent, first troop transport to return from Korea.
  - April 24 – Lt. General James A. Van Fleet.
  - July 21 – Ben Hogan, winner of the Triple Crown of Golf.
  - October 1 – José Antonio Remón Cantera, president of Panama
  - October 20 – General Mark W. Clark
  - October 26 – Major General William F. Dean
  - November 2 – King Paul and Queen Friederike of Greece.
- 1954
  - February 1 – Celal Bayar, president of Turkey.
  - April 22 – U.S. 4th Infantry Division, following return from Korea
  - June 1 – Haile Selassie, emperor of Ethiopia.
  - July 26 – Lieutenant Geneviève de Galard-Terraube, the "Angel of Dien Bien Phu".
  - August 2 – Syngman Rhee, president of South Korea.
  - September 27 – New York Giants, winners of the National League pennant.
  - October 28 – William V.S. Tubman, president of Liberia.
  - November 19 – Lt. Gen. Withers A. Burress, retiring Commander of the First Army
- 1955
  - January 31 – Paul Eugène Magloire, president of Haiti.
  - August 11 – Order of the Knights of Pythias.
  - November 4 – Carlos Castillo Armas, president of Guatemala.
  - December 9 – Luis Batlle Berres, president of Uruguay.
- 1956
  - March 12 – Giovanni Gronchi, president of Italy.
  - May 15 – Armed Forces Day.
  - May 23 – Sukarno, president of Indonesia.
- 1957
  - May 2 – Navy League tribute for 60 commanders of the Navy and Marines during World War II.
  - May 13 – Ngo Dinh Diem, president of South Vietnam.
  - July 2 – Captain Alan J. Villiers and the crew of the Mayflower II.
  - July 11 – Althea Gibson, winner of the Wimbledon women's singles championship.
  - October 21 – Queen Elizabeth II of the United Kingdom.
  - December 9 – King Mohammed V of Morocco.
- 1958
  - May 20 – Van Cliburn, winner of the Moscow International Tchaikovsky Competition. The only musician to ever receive a ticker tape parade tribute.
  - June 20 – Theodor Heuss, president of West Germany.
  - June 23 – Carlos P. Garcia, president of the Philippines.
  - August 27 – Rear Admiral Hyman G. Rickover, Commander William Anderson, and the crew of the USS Nautilus.
- 1959
  - January 29 – Arturo Frondizi, president of Argentina.
  - February 10 – Willy Brandt, mayor of West Berlin.
  - March 13 – José María Lemus, president of El Salvador.
  - March 20 – Seán T. O'Kelly, President of Ireland.
  - May 29 – King Baudouin of Belgium.
  - September 11 – Princess Beatrix of the Netherlands.
  - October 14 – Adolfo López Mateos, president of Mexico.
  - November 4 – Ahmed Sékou Touré, president of Guinea.

== 1960s ==
- 1960
  - March 9 – Carol Heiss, Olympic figure skating gold medalist.
  - April 11 – Alberto Lleras Camargo, president of Colombia.
  - April 26 – Charles de Gaulle, president of France.
  - May 2 – King Mahendra Bir Bikram Shah and Queen Ratna Rajya Lakshmi Devi of Nepal.
  - July 5 – King Bhumibol Adulyadej and Queen Sirikit Kitiyakara of Thailand.
  - October 14 – King Frederik IX and Queen Ingrid of Denmark
  - October 19 – John F. Kennedy, Democratic presidential nominee.
  - November 2 – President Dwight Eisenhower and Vice President Richard Nixon, Republican presidential nominee.
- 1961
  - April 10 – New York Yankees, winners of the American League pennant.
  - May 11 – Habib Bourguiba, president of Tunisia.
  - October 13 – Ibrahim Abboud, president of Sudan.
  - October 27 – builders and crew of the USS Constellation
- 1962
  - March 1 – John Glenn, following the Mercury-Atlas 6 mission.
  - April 5 – João Goulart, president of Brazil.
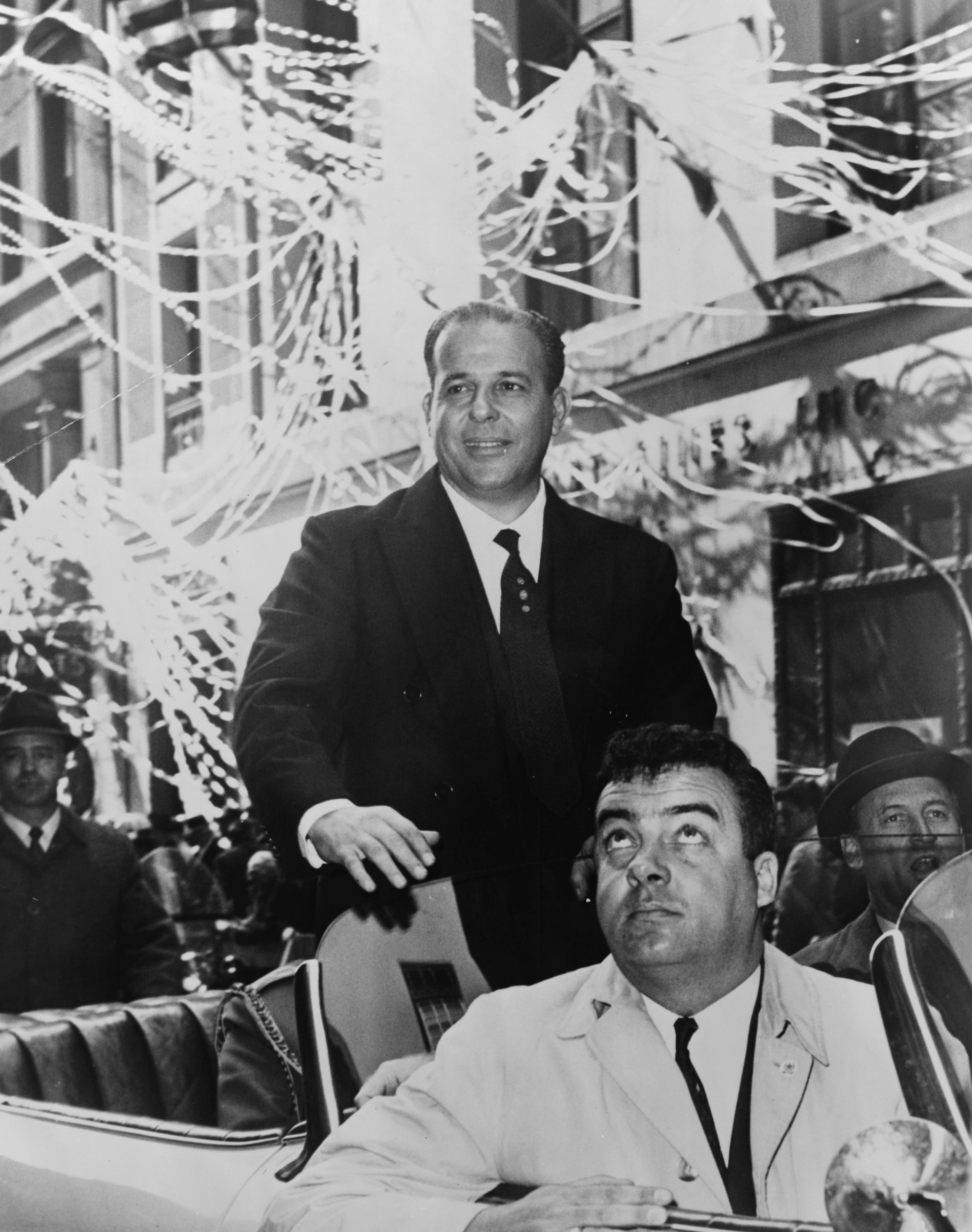
    Ticker-tape parade for Brazilian president João Goulart
  - April 9 – New York Yankees, winners of the World Series.
  - April 12 – New York Mets, upon entering the National League.
  - April 16 – Shah Mohammad Reza Pahlavi and Empress Farah of Iran.
  - May 25 – Félix Houphouët-Boigny, president of Ivory Coast.
  - June 5 – Scott Carpenter, following the Mercury 7 mission.
  - June 8 – Archbishop Makarios, head of the Cypriot Orthodox Church and president of Cyprus.
  - June 14 – Roberto F. Chiari, president of Panama.
- 1963
  - January 17 – Antonio Segni, president of Italy.
  - April 1 – King Hassan II of Morocco.
  - May 22 – Gordon Cooper, following the Mercury 9 mission.
  - June 10 – Sarvepalli Radhakrishnan, president of India.
  - September 10 – King Mohammed Zahir Shah and Queen Humaira of Afghanistan.
  - October 4 – Haile Selassie, emperor of Ethiopia.

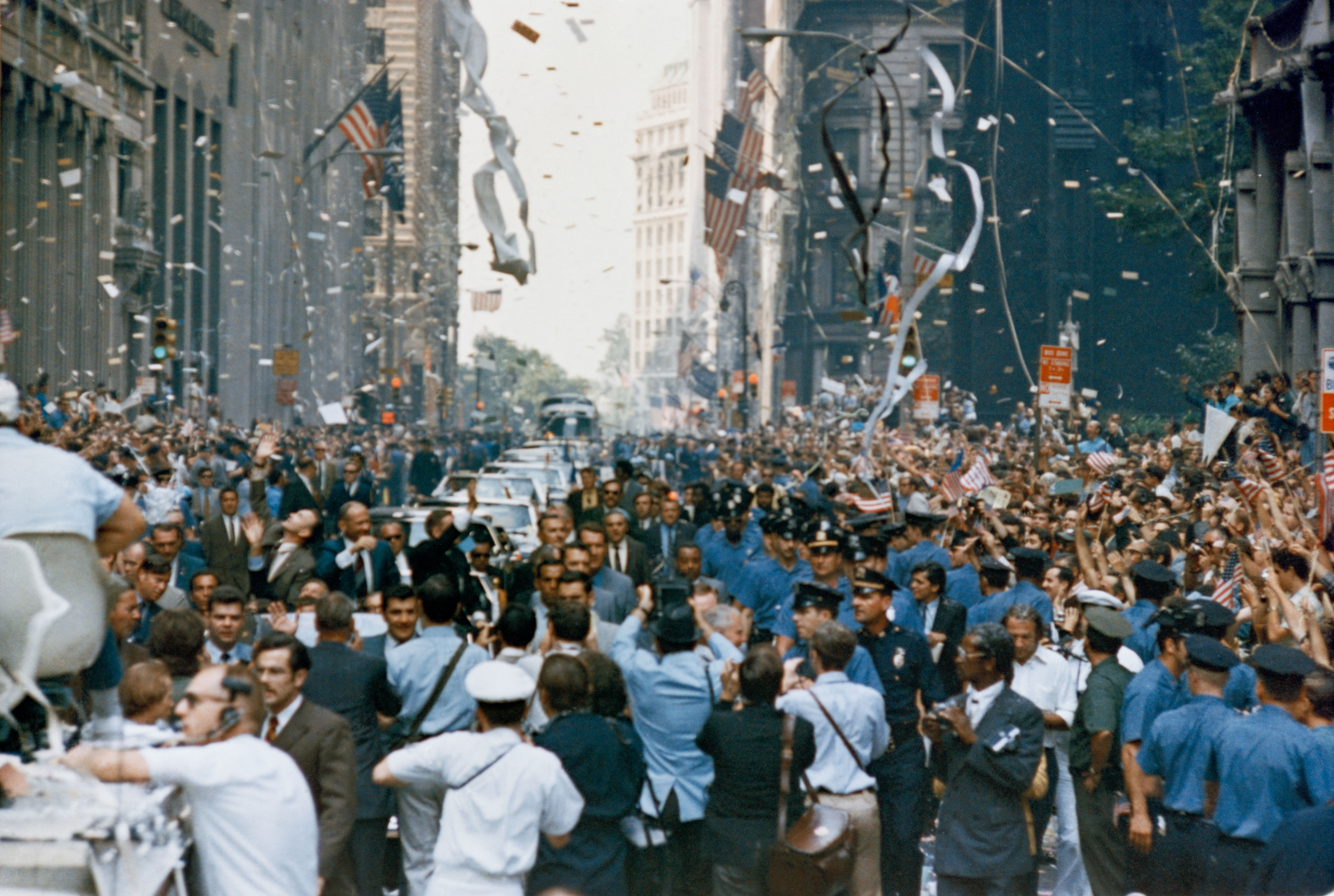
Ticker tape parade for the Apollo 11 astronauts

- 1964
  - July 16 – Operation Sail vessel crews.
  - October 8 – Diosdado Macapagal, president of the Philippines.
- 1965
  - March 29 – Virgil "Gus" Grissom and John Young, following the Gemini 3 mission.
  - May 19 – Chung Hee Park, president of South Korea.
- 1969
  - January 10 – Frank Borman, James A. Lovell, and William A. Anders, following the Apollo 8 mission to the Moon.
  - August 13 – Neil Armstrong, Buzz Aldrin, and Michael Collins, following the Apollo 11 mission to the Moon.
  - October 20 – New York Mets championship in the World Series.

== 1970s ==
- 1971
  - March 8 – Alan Shepard, Edgar Mitchell, and Stuart Roosa, following Apollo 14 mission to the Moon.
  - August 24 – David Scott, James Irwin, and Alfred Worden, following Apollo 15 mission to the Moon.
- 1976
  - July 6 – Sailors from around the world participating in Bicentennial Operation Sail.
- 1977
  - October 19 – New York Yankees championship in the World Series.
- 1978
  - October 19 – New York Yankees championship in the World Series.
- 1979
  - October 3 – Pope John Paul II.

== 1980s ==
- 1981
  - January 30 – American hostages released from Iran.
- 1984
  - August 15 – U.S. Summer Olympics medalists.
- 1985
  - May 7 – Vietnam War veterans.
- 1986
  - October 28 – New York Mets championship in the World Series.

== 1990s ==
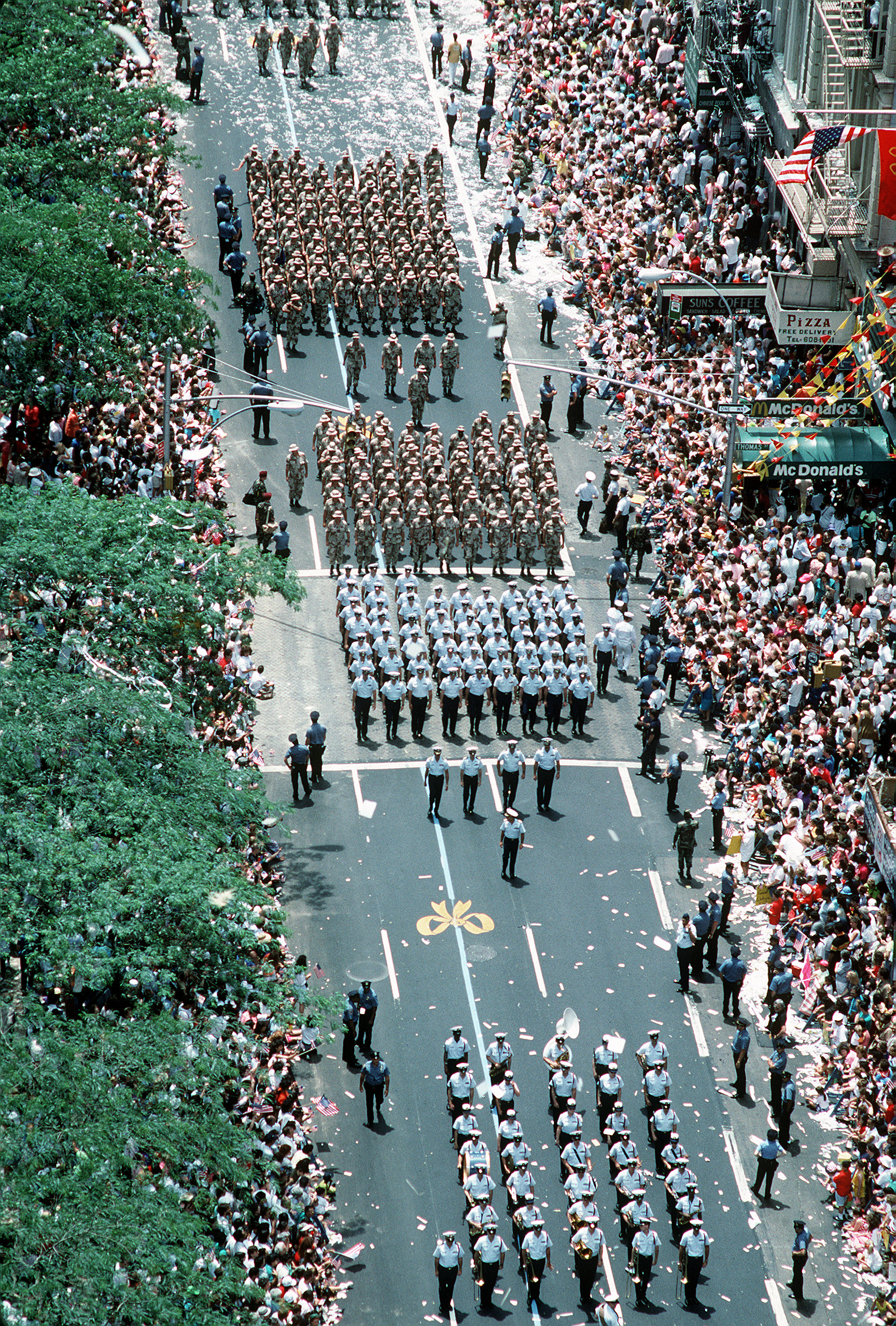
Desert Storm march in the Welcome Home parade

- 1990
  - June 20 – Nelson Mandela of South Africa.
- 1991
  - June 10 – Gulf War veterans (two days after the National Victory Celebration in Washington, D.C.)
  - June 25 – Korean War veterans.
- 1994
  - June 17 – New York Rangers, winners of the Stanley Cup championship.
- 1996
  - October 29 – New York Yankees championship in the World Series.
- 1998
  - October 17 – Sammy Sosa, Chicago Cubs right fielder, who hit 66 home runs that season, and for helping with relief of the effects of Hurricane Georges in the Dominican Republic.
  - October 23 – New York Yankees championship in the World Series.
  - November 16 – John Glenn and astronauts of Space Shuttle Discovery mission STS-95.
- 1999
  - October 29 – New York Yankees championship in the World Series.

== 2000s ==
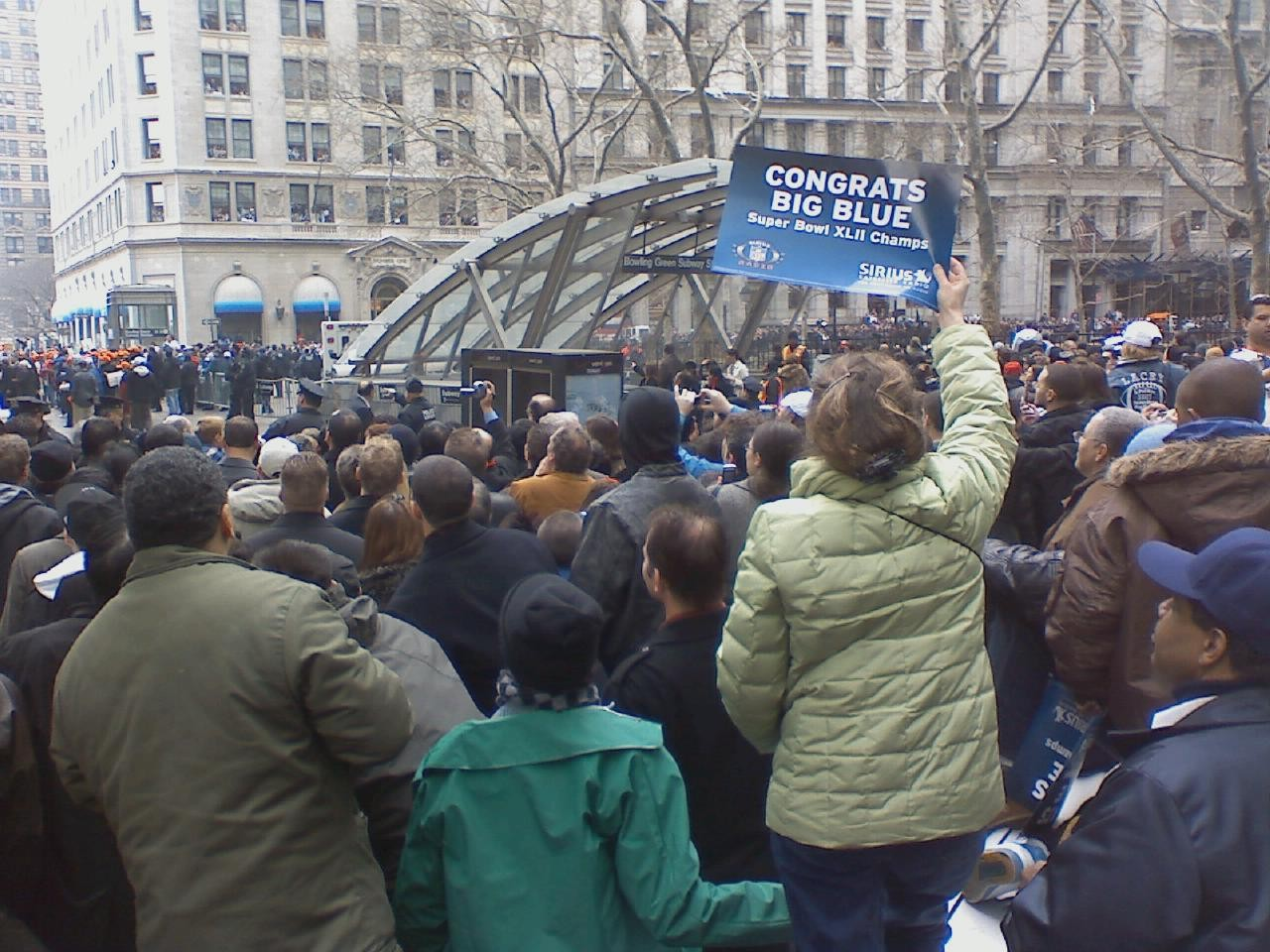
Crowds at Bowling Green Station to witness the ticker-tape parade for the Super Bowl champion New York Giants, February 2008

- 2000
  - October 30 – New York Yankees championship in the World Series.
- 2008
  - February 5 – New York Giants championship in Super Bowl XLII.
- 2009
  - November 6 – New York Yankees championship in the World Series.

== 2010s ==
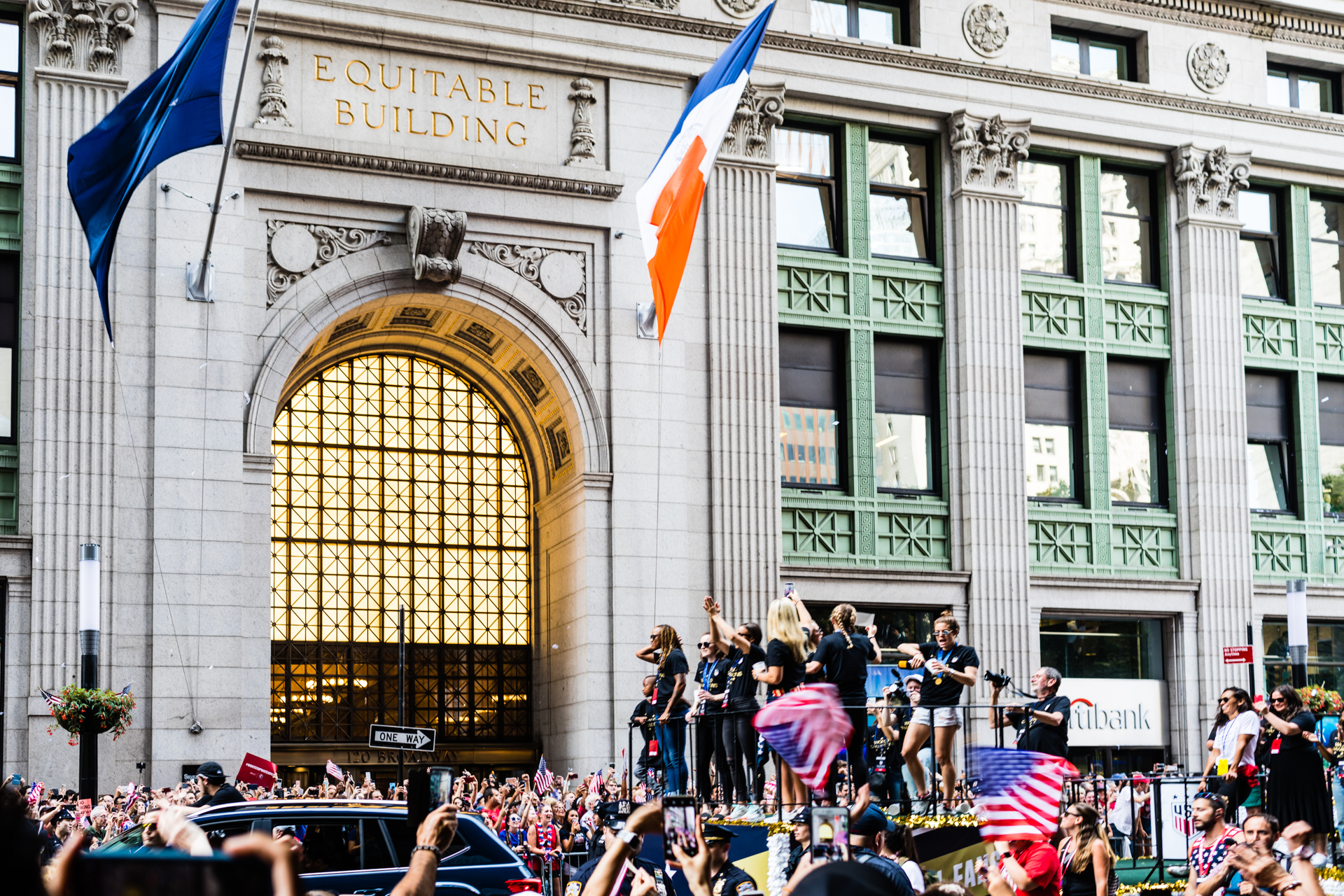
USWNT at a parade in their honor after the 2019 Championship

- 2012
  - February 7 – New York Giants championship in Super Bowl XLVI.
- 2015
  - July 10 – United States women's national soccer team championship in the 2015 FIFA Women's World Cup.
- 2019
  - July 10 – United States women's national soccer team championship in the 2019 FIFA Women's World Cup.

== 2020s ==
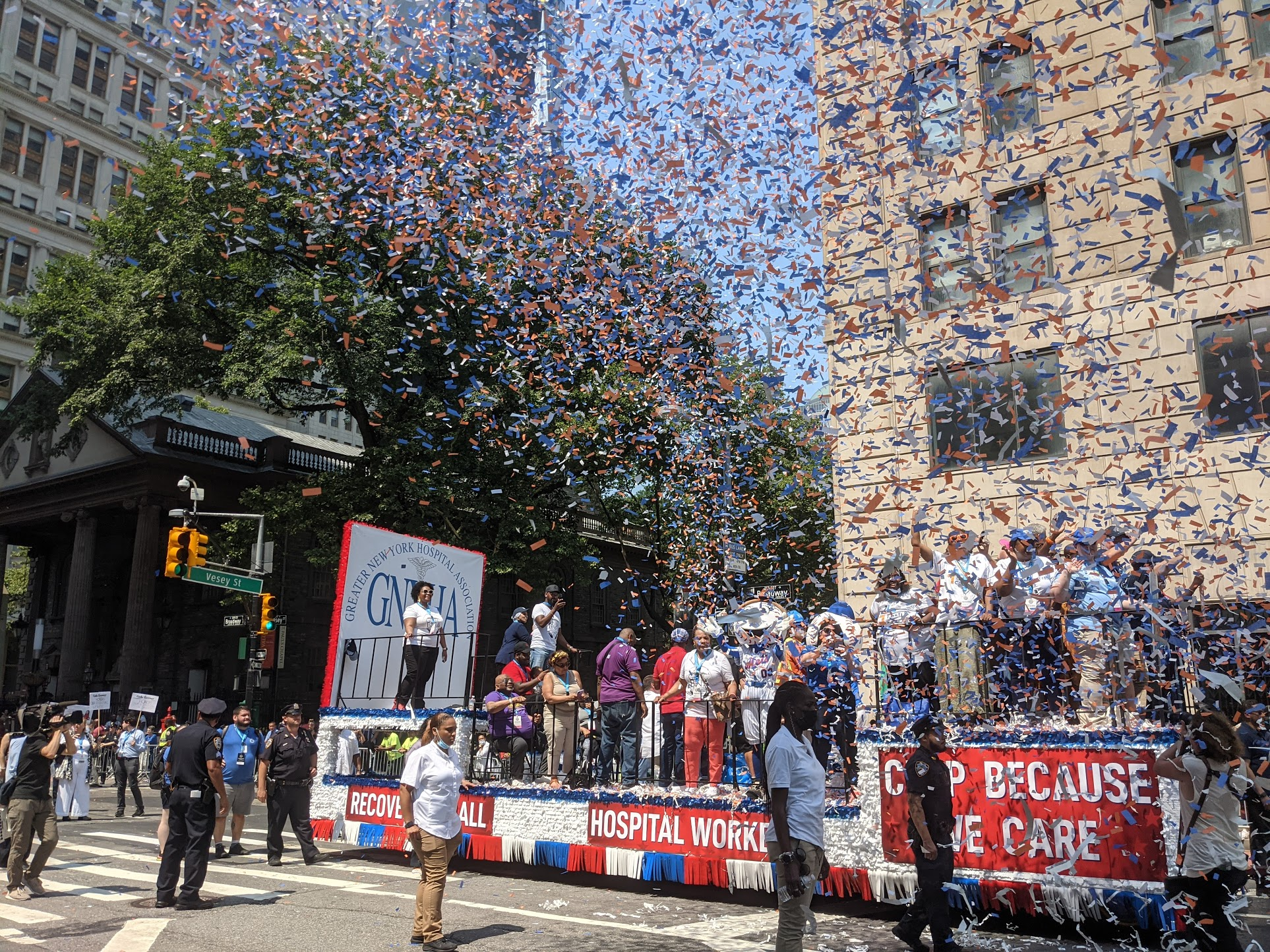
Healthcare workers being honored for their efforts in combatting COVID-19

- 2021
  - July 7 – Healthcare professionals and essential workers for their labor during the COVID-19 pandemic
- 2024
  - October 24 – New York Liberty championship in 2024 WNBA Finals
- 2025
  - November 24 - Gotham FC, winner of the 2025 NWSL Championship (Note: The Gotham FC ticker-tape parade in 2025 began at Barclay Street and ran north for four blocks along Broadway to Chambers Street.)
- 2026
  - June 18 – New York Knicks championship in the 2026 NBA Finals

== Individuals honored with multiple parades ==
Richard E. Byrd (3), George Fried (2), Bobby Jones (2), Amelia Earhart (2), Wiley Post (2), Dwight D. Eisenhower (2), Hugo Eckener (2), Charles de Gaulle (2), Haile Selassie (2), John Glenn (2), Alcide De Gasperi (2).

== Sports teams honored ==
New York Yankees (9), U.S. Olympic team (5, plus 2 individual parades for Jesse Owens and Carol Heiss), New York Mets (3), New York Giants (football) (2), U.S. women's national soccer team (2), New York Giants (baseball) (1), New York Rangers (1), New York Liberty (1), New York Knicks (1), Gotham FC (1).

== Potential revisions ==
In 2017, then Mayor Bill de Blasio announced on Twitter that he intended to have Marshall Pétain's plaque removed from the Canyon of Heroes. This happened after a national debate over the propriety of Confederate monuments spilled over into a reassessment of monuments in general. Pétain was honored in 1931 for his service in World War I. After France's defeat by Germany, he advocated surrender rather than resistance; Pétain headed the Nazi collaborationist government of Vichy France from 1940–1944. France itself has largely removed all commemoration for Pétain; the last street named after him was renamed in 2010.
