= Santa Fe class 5011 =

Class of American steam locomotives

Santa Fe 5011 class
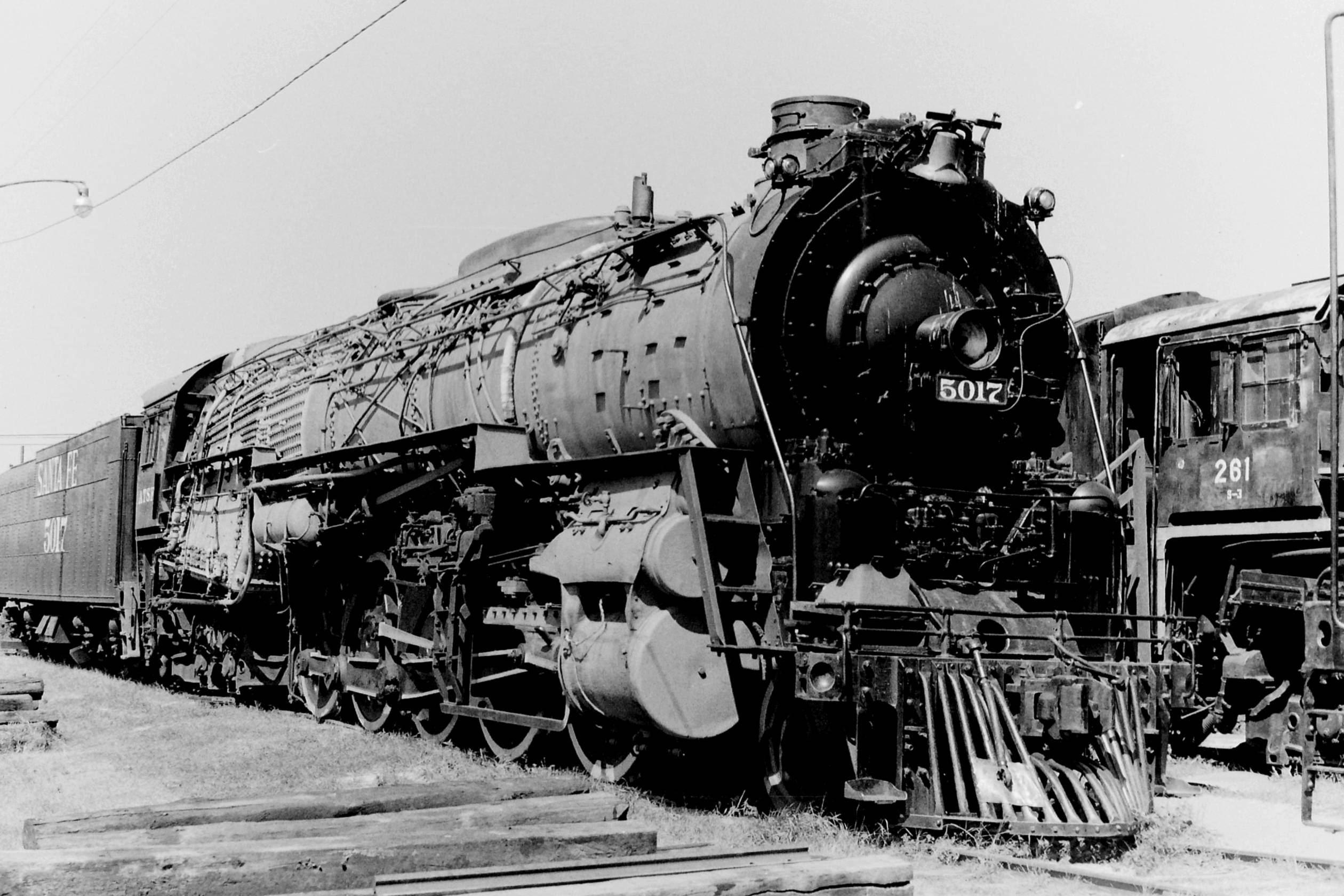
- #5017 at the National Railroad Museum next to Milwaukee Road 261 in 1970
Type and origin
- Power type: Steam
- Builder: Baldwin Locomotive Works
- Serial number: 70817-70841
- Build date: 1944
- Total produced: 25
Specifications
- Configuration
  - Whyte: 2-10-4
  - UIC: 1′E2′ h2
- Gauge: 4 ft 8 1/2 in (1,435 mm) standard gauge
- Driver dia.: 74 in (1,880 mm)
- Wheelbase: Loco & tender: 98.64 ft (30.07 m)
- Length: 123 ft 5 in (37.62 m)
- Height: 16 ft 0 in (4.88 m)
- Axle load: 76,060 lb (34,500 kilograms; 34.50 metric tons)
- Adhesive weight: 380,300 lb (172,500 kilograms; 172.5 metric tons)
- Loco weight: 538,000 lb (244,000 kilograms; 244 metric tons)
- Tender weight: 464,700 lb (210,800 kilograms; 210.8 metric tons)
- Total weight: 1,002,700 lb (454,800 kilograms; 454.8 metric tons)
- Fuel type: Fuel oil
- Fuel capacity: 7,000 US gal (26,000 L; 5,800 imp gal)
- Water cap.: 24,500 US gal (93,000 L; 20,400 imp gal)
- Firebox
  - Grate area: 121.70 sq ft (11.306 m^{2})
- Boiler: 104 in (2,642 mm)
- Boiler pressure: 310 lbf/in^{2} (2.14 MPa)
- Heating surface
  - Firebox: 494 sq ft (45.9 m^{2})
- Superheater
  - Heating area: 2,640 sq ft (245 m^{2})
- Cylinders: Two
- Cylinder size: 30 in × 34 in (762 mm × 864 mm)
- Valve gear: Walschaert
Performance figures
- Maximum speed: 70 mph (110 km/h)
- Power output: 5,660 hp (4,220 kW) @ 40 mph (64 km/h) (drawbar)
- Tractive effort: 93,000 lbf (413.68 kN)
- Factor of adh.: 4.06
Career
- Operators: Santa Fe
- Class: 5011
- Numbers: 5011–5035
- Retired: 1950-1959
- Preserved: Four (Nos. 5011, 5017, 5021 and 5030) preserved
- Scrapped: 1953-1963
- Disposition: Nos. 5011, 5017, 5021 and 5030 on display, remainder scrapped

The Atchison, Topeka and Santa Fe Railway class 5011 was the last class of steam locomotives to be purchased by AT&SF. The class was introduced by Baldwin Locomotive Works in 1944.

== History ==
A total of 25 of these large engines were built. They were nicknamed "War Babies" by the AT&SF from being built and used during World War II.

The AT&SF ran the class from the mid-1940s to the mid-late 1950s. Despite being mainly freight haulers, their driving wheels were unusually tall for a "Texas" type, which led to them also being successful in passenger service.

=== Specifications ===
Numbers 5011 to 5035, when built, were the largest and fastest class of "Texas"-type locomotives ever built and equipped with Timken roller bearings on every axle.

The engines had a maximum output of 5,600 horsepower (4,200 kW) measured at the rear of the tender, at a top speed of 70 miles per hour (110 km/h).

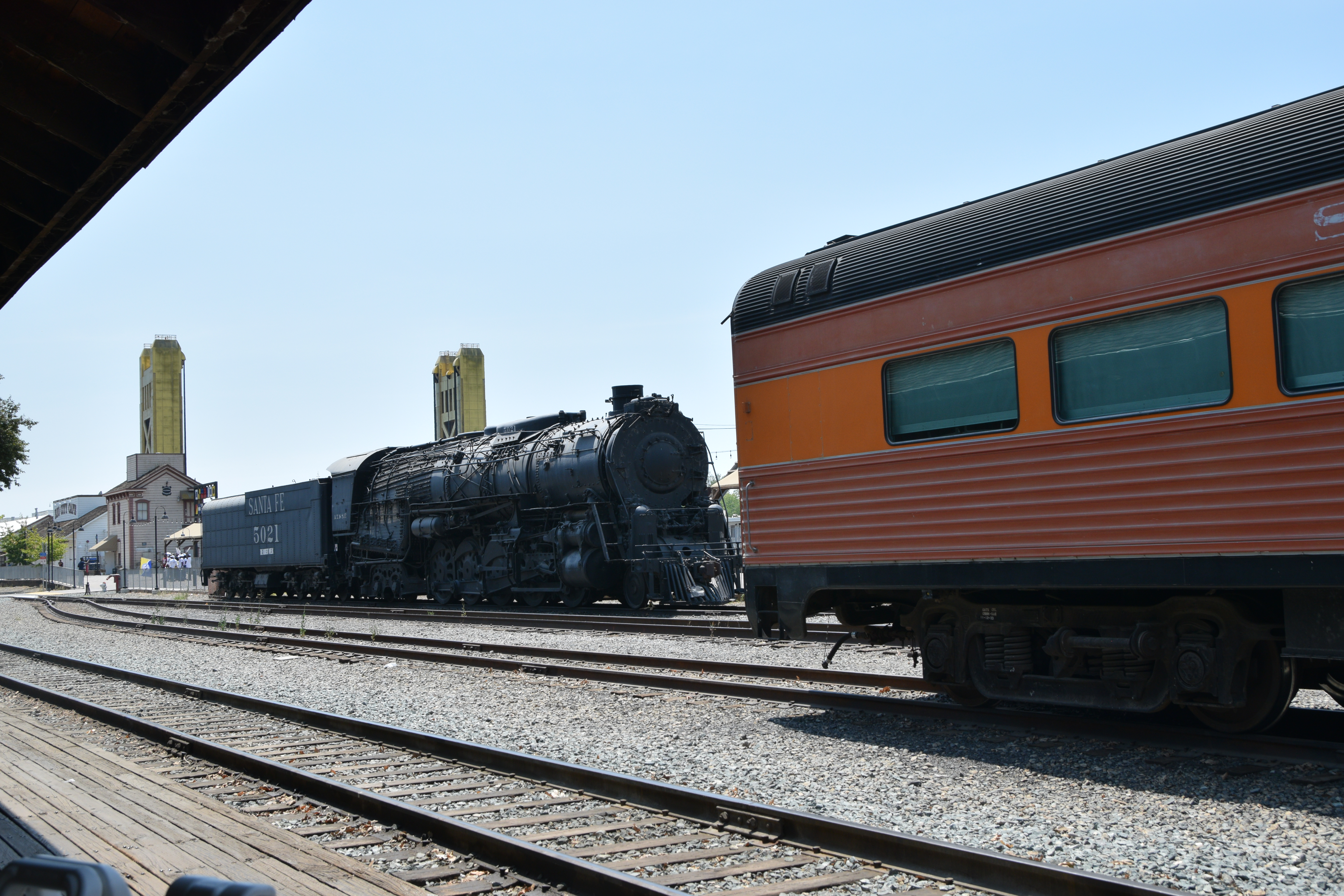
Santa Fe 5021 on the Sacramento Southern, adjacent to the California State Railroad Museum

== Present day ==
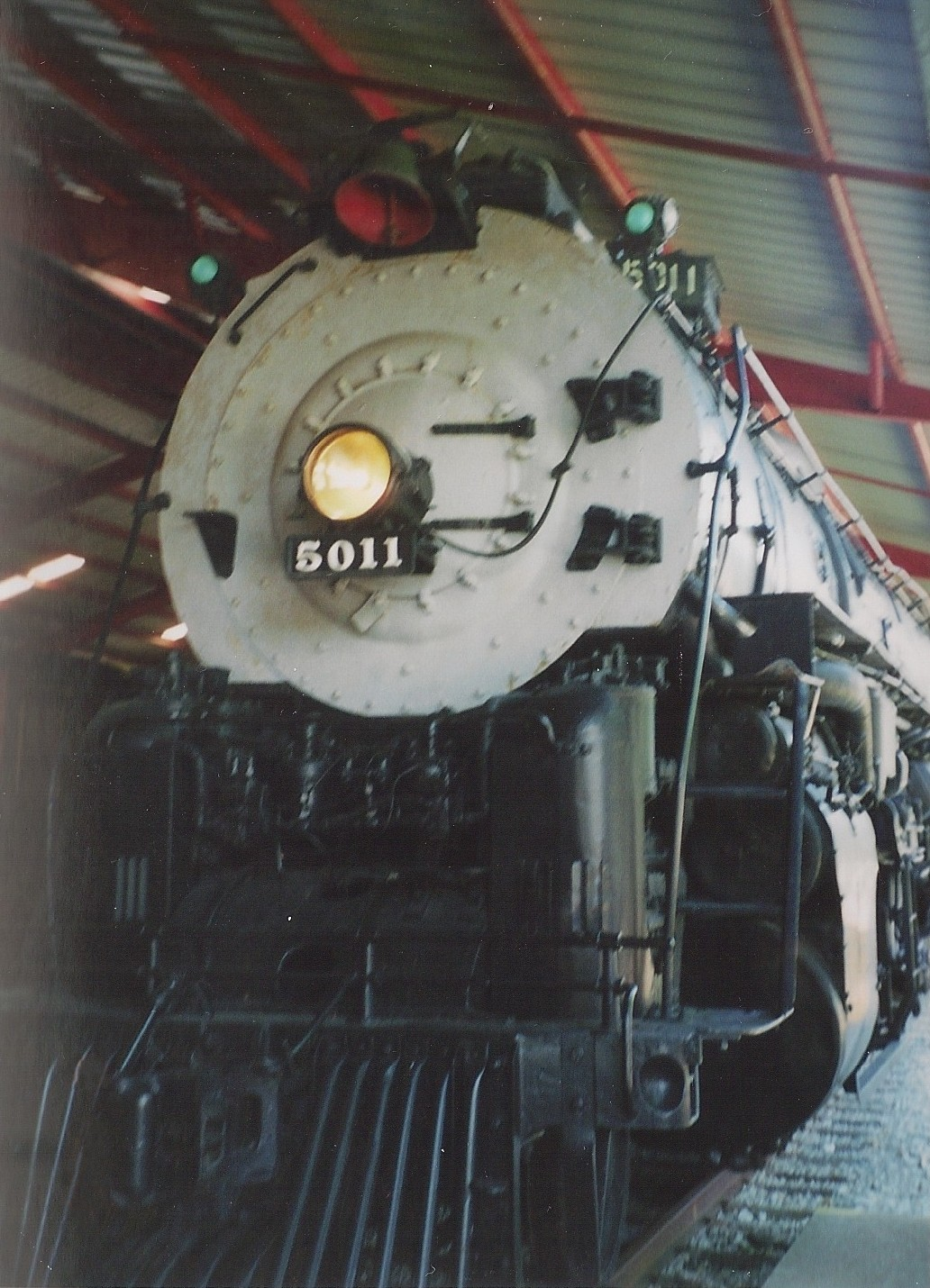
#5011 at the National Museum of Transportation in 2004

Four of the class 5011 locomotives were preserved by the AT&SF for museums, with the remainder being scrapped.

The four preserved locomotives are:

- #5011 — at the National Museum of Transportation, Kirkwood, Missouri.
- #5017 — at the National Railroad Museum, Green Bay, Wisconsin
- #5021 — at the California State Railroad Museum, Sacramento, California.
- #5030 — at Salvador Perez Park, in Santa Fe, New Mexico.

== See also ==
- Steam locomotives of the United States
- Atchison, Topeka and Santa Fe Railway locomotives
- Baldwin locomotives
