= Santa Fe 5017 =

Preserved American 2-10-4 steam locomotive

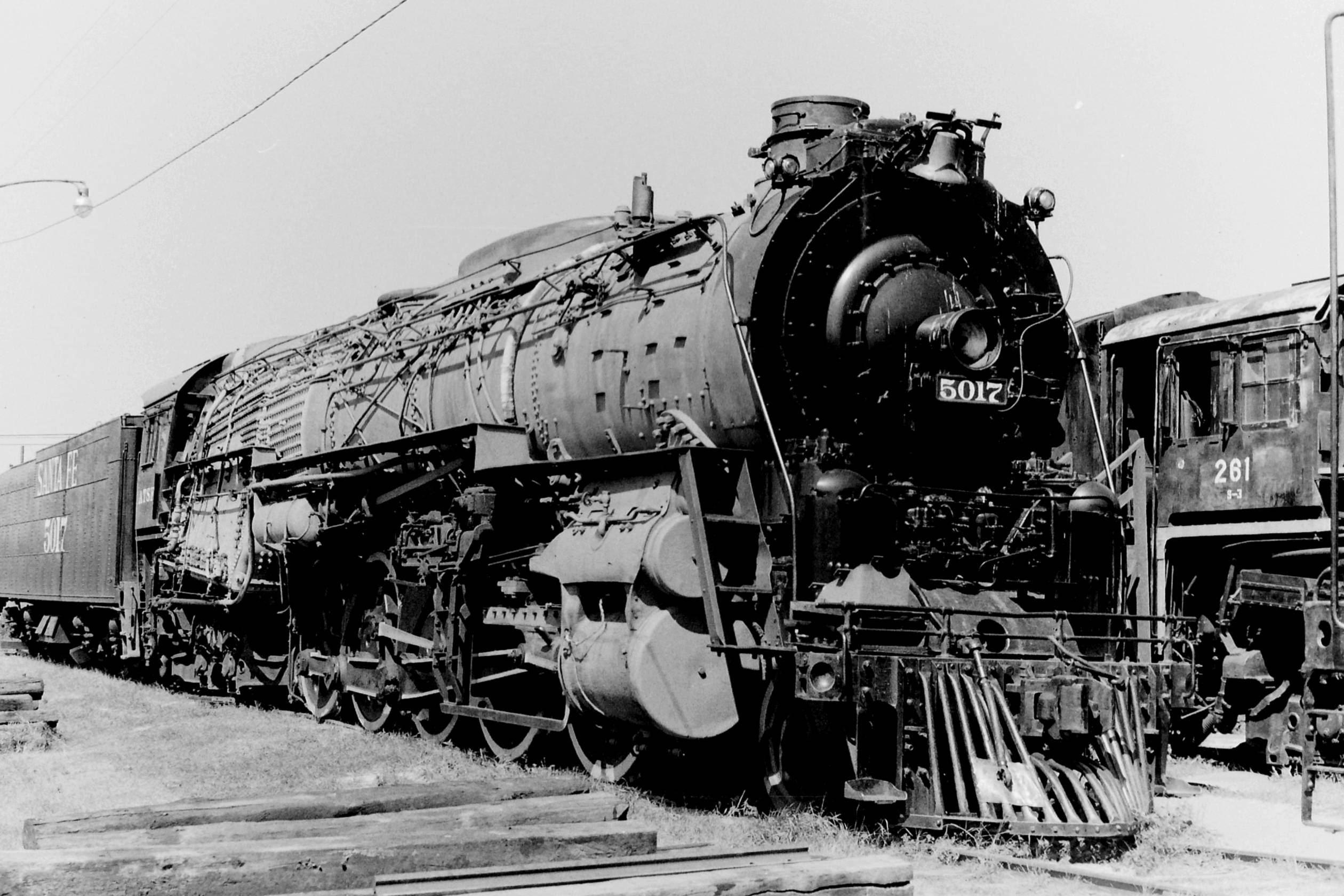
- ATSF 5017 at the National Railroad Museum, Green Bay in August 1970
Type and origin
- Power type: Steam
- Builder: Baldwin Locomotive Works
- Serial number: 70823
- Build date: 1944
Specifications
- Configuration
  - Whyte: 2-10-4
  - UIC: 1′E2′ h2
- Gauge: 4 ft 8 1/2 in (1,435 mm)
- Leading dia.: 42 in (1,067 mm)
- Driver dia.: 74 in (1.880 m)
- Length: 123 ft 5 in (37.62 m)
- Adhesive weight: 380,300 lb (172.5 t)
- Total weight: 1,000,700 lb (453.9 t)
- Fuel type: Oil
- Fuel capacity: 7,000 US gal (26,000 L; 5,800 imp gal)
- Water cap.: 24,500 US gal (93,000 L; 20,400 imp gal)
- Boiler: 108 in (2,743 mm)
- Boiler pressure: 310 psi (2.14 MPa)
- Cylinders: Two, outside
- Cylinder size: 30 in × 34 in (762 mm × 864 mm)
- Valve gear: Walschaerts
- Valve type: Piston valves
- Loco brake: Air
- Train brakes: Air
- Couplers: Knuckle
Performance figures
- Power output: 5,600 hp (4,200 kW)
- Tractive effort: 93,000 lbf (413.7 kN)
- Factor of adh.: 4.06
Career
- Operators: Atchison, Topeka, and Santa Fe
- Class: 5011
- Number in class: 7 of 37
- Numbers: ATSF 5017
- Nicknames: War Babie
- Retired: July 25, 1955
- Current owner: National Railroad Museum
- Disposition: On static display

Santa Fe 5017 is a preserved 5011 class 2-10-4 "Texas" type steam locomotive built by the Baldwin Locomotive Works (BLW) in 1944 for the Atchison, Topeka and Santa Fe Railway (ATSF).

== History ==
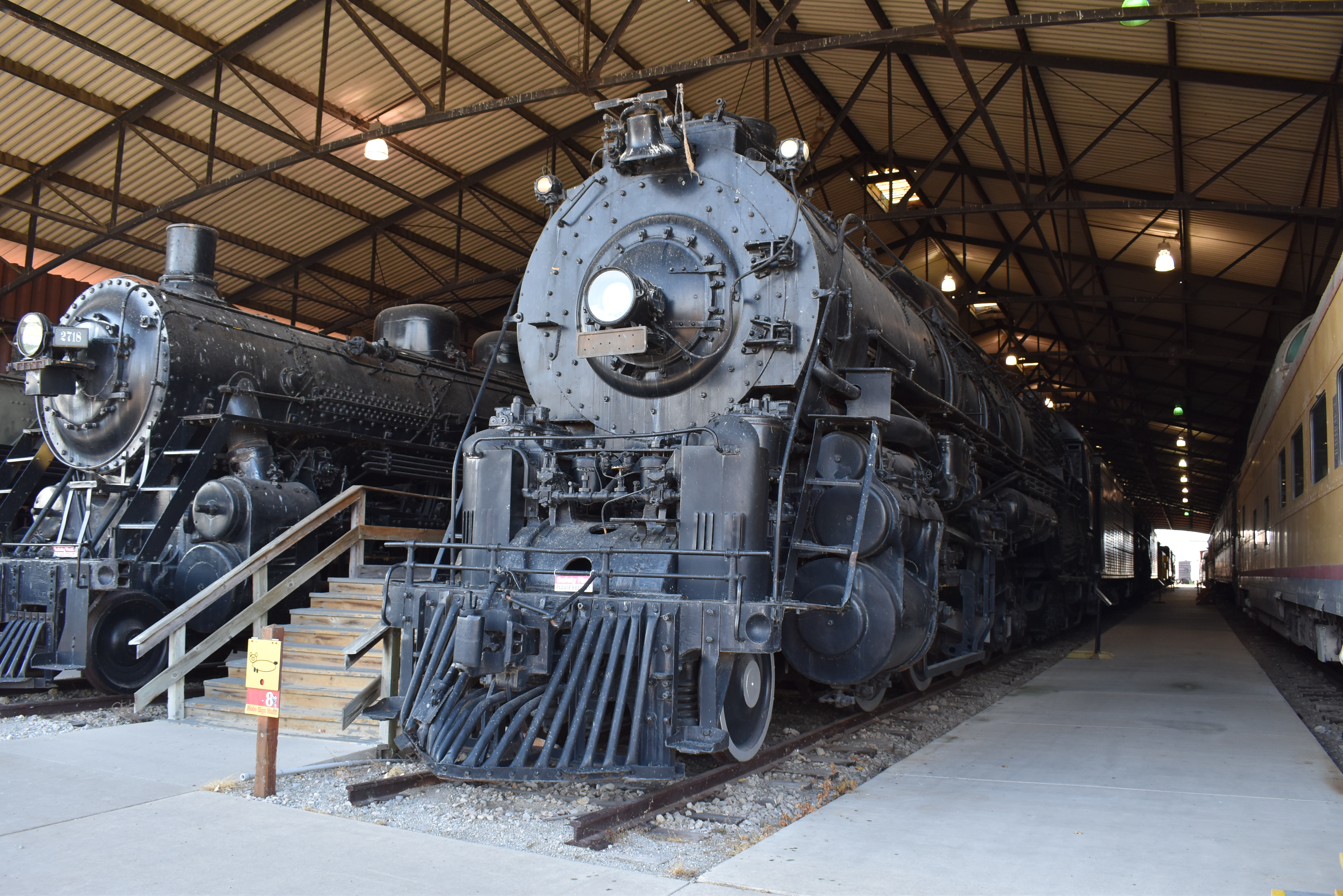
AT&SF No. 5017 on display at the National Railroad Museum next to Soo Line H-23 class 2718 in 2022

No. 5017 was built by Baldwin Locomotive Works (BLW) in 1944 during World War II. The 5017, along with the 5011 Class 2-10-4's, were nicknamed "War Babies" by the AT&SF. It entered service on July 20 of that year and was assigned to freight service on the Pecos division, the Mountain Division of New Mexico. The 5017 operated between Belen, New Mexico, Waynoka, Oklahoma, and La Junta, Colorado. Between 1953 and 1955, No. 5017 was used in extra service on the Pecos division in eastern New Mexico to supplement diesel power during the peak movement of perishables, grains and other commodities. On July 25, 1955, No. 5017 made her last trip, tallying 755,088 miles. Then, the locomotive was retired by the AT&SF's newer, lower-maintenance Diesels.

No. 5017 was brought to the National Railroad Museum through the efforts of former director W.L. Thorton, who was the Director of Traffic for the Kimberly-Clark railway. It was formally donated on December 27, 1959, by E. Marsh, President of the Santa Fe Railway. Today, 5017 is one of 5 Surviving 2-10-4 Texas Type locomotives that were built for AT&SF.

== Bibliography ==
- "The Santa Fe Magazine". The Santa Fe Magazine. No. 54. 1960. p. 20.
- "Steam Passenger Service Directory". Steam Passenger Service Directory. No. 4. 1969. p. 94.
- Randolph Kean (1973). "The Railfan's Guide to Museum & Park Displays". The Railfan's Guide to Museum & Park Displays: 194.
- "Railroads of North America". Railroads of North America: 79. 1978.
