= Merci Train =

Diplomatic gift of France to the U.S.

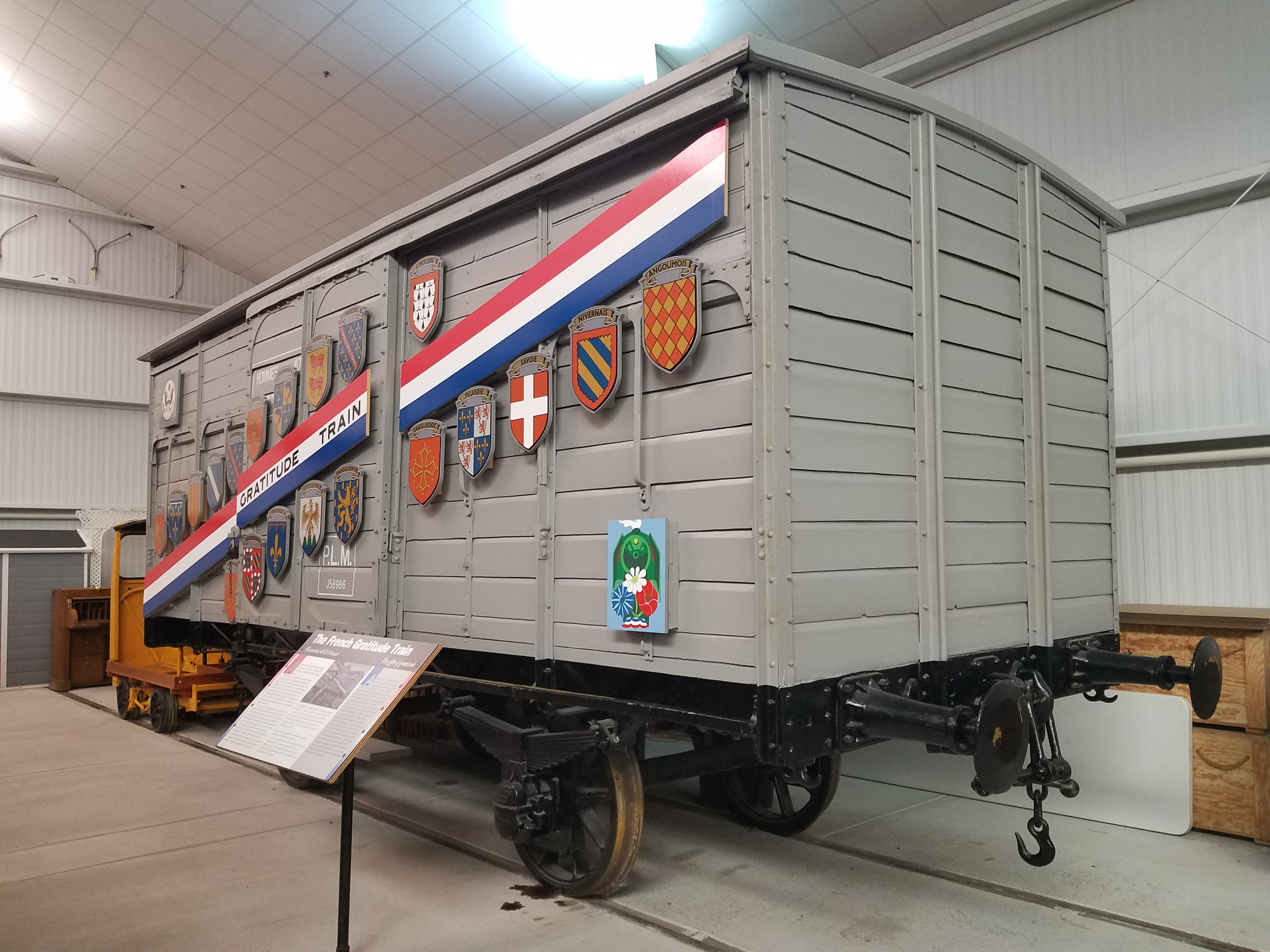
- Photograph of boxcar from French "Merci train," a gift from France to the United States in grateful recognition of U.S. aid to France after World War II.

The French Gratitude Train (French: Train de la Reconnaissance française), commonly referred to as the Merci Train, were 49 World War I era "forty and eight" boxcars given to the United States by France in response to the 1947 U.S. Friendship Train. It arrived in Weehawken, New Jersey on February 2, 1949.

== Background ==
The idea to send a "thank you" gift to the United States for the $40 million in food and other supplies sent to France and Italy in 1947 came from a French railroad worker and World War II veteran named Andre Picard. Donations for the Merci Train came from over six million citizens of France and Italy in the form of dolls, statues, clothes, ornamental objects, furniture, and even a Legion of Honour medal purported to have belonged to Napoleon.

== History ==
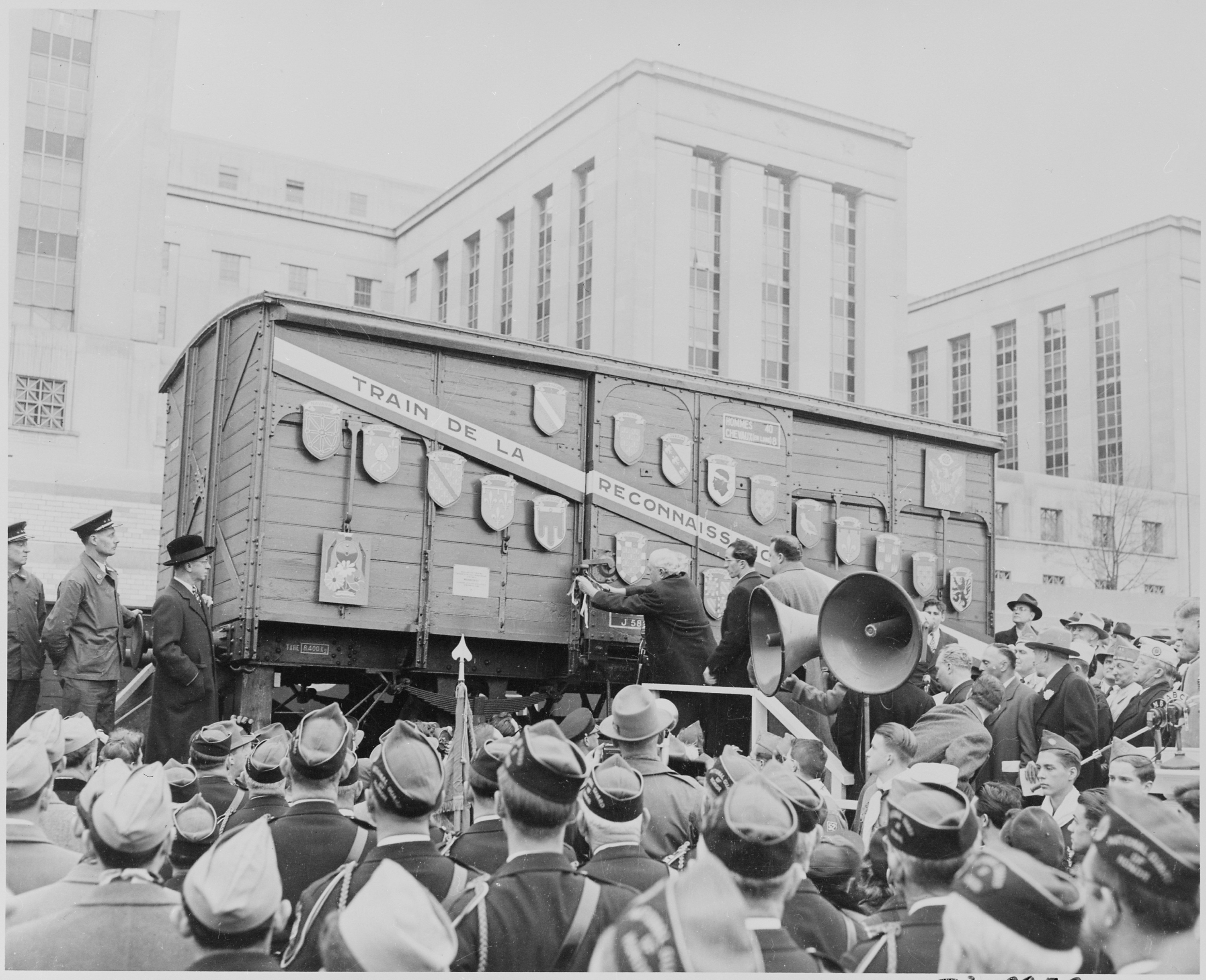
Merci Train presentation ceremony in the Fourteenth Street yards opposite the Bureau of Engraving and Printing, Washington, D.C. in 1949.

The boxcars were "forty-and-eights" used during both world wars. The term refers to the cars' carrying capacity, said to be 40 men or eight horses. Built starting in the 1870s as regular freight boxcars, they were originally used in military service by the French army in both World Wars, and then later used by the German occupation in World War II and finally by the Allied liberators.

In 1949, France sent 49 of those boxcars to the United States (one for each state and the Territory of Hawaii) laden with various treasures, as a show of gratitude for the liberation of France. This train was called the Merci Train, and was sent in response to trains full (over 700 boxcars) of supplies known as the Friendship Train sent by the American people to France in 1947. Each of the Merci Train boxcars carried five tons of gifts, all of which were donated by private citizens.

The Train and all 49 cars arrived aboard the Magellan on February 2, 1949, with over 25,000 onlookers in attendance. On the side of the gift-laden French freighter was painted, "MERCI AMERICA". Immediately the trains were distributed amongst the states.

== Boxcars ==
The Merci Train boxcars were opened and turned into travelling exhibits before each state committee distributed the entire contents. The 43 surviving boxcars are on public display within each state as follows:

Boxcar	Image	Location	City or town	Notes
Alabama		U.S. Veterans Memorial Museum; 34.692051°N 86.586194°W	Huntsville	The Alabama State Archives has a collection of French gifts from the boxcar.
Arizona		McCormick-Stillman Railroad Park; 33.537500°N 111.923333°W	Scottsdale	The Arizona Capitol Museum has a collection of French gifts from the boxcar.
Arkansas		American Legion Post 41; 34.527528°N 90.588361°W	Helena–West Helena	The Arkansas Museum of Fine Arts has a collection of French gifts from the boxcar.
California		American Legion Post 509; 36.782337°N 119.772787°W	Fresno	The California State Archives has a collection of records from the French Merci Train Gift Distribution Committee.
Colorado		Unknown		Car has been lost. The Woodruff Memorial Library has a collection of French gifts from the boxcar.
Connecticut		Destroyed		The Abbey of Regina Laudis was gifted a French church bell from the boxcar.
Delaware		American Legion Post 6; 38.644101°N 75.609211°W	Seaford	Owned and maintained by Forty and Eight Voiture 1320 of Sussex County
Florida		Holly Hill City Hall; 29.244416°N 81.040179°W	Holly Hill	The city hall has a collection of French gifts from the boxcar.
Georgia		Southern Museum of Civil War and Locomotive History; 34.024000°N 84.614400°W	Kennesaw	The Georgia State Archives has a collection of French gifts from the boxcar.
Idaho		Old Idaho State Penitentiary; 43.602700°N 116.162000°W	Boise	The Idaho Historical Society has a collection of French gifts from the boxcar.
Illinois		Unknown		Possibly abandoned and destroyed at the old 1948-1949 Chicago Railroad Fair site.
Indiana		Veterans National Memorial Shrine and Museum; 41.093330°N 85.246208°W	Fort Wayne	The Fort Wayne History Center has a collection of French gifts from the boxcar.
Iowa		Antique Acres; 42.609824°N 92.457628°W	Cedar Falls	The Iowa Historical Society has a collection of French gifts from the boxcar.
Kansas		Veterans Memorial Park; 38.872050°N 99.300760°W	Hays	Owned and maintained by Forty and Eight Voiture 1543 of Ellis County
Kentucky		Kentucky Railway Museum; 37.657103°N 85.593405°W	New Haven	The Kentucky Historical Society has a collection of French gifts from the boxcar.
Louisiana		Old Louisiana State Capitol; 30.446881°N 91.188861°W	Baton Rouge	
Maine		Railway Village Museum; 43.902926°N 69.621776°W	Boothbay	The Maine State Museum has a collection of French gifts from the boxcar.
Maryland		B&O Railroad Museum; 39.285509°N 76.632619°W	Baltimore	The Montgomery County Historical Society has a collection of French gifts from the boxcar.
Massachusetts		Destroyed		scrapped in the 1960s
Michigan		American Legion Post 183; 42.667663°N 84.606928°W	Lansing	Owned and maintained by Forty and Eight Voiture 946 of Eaton County.
Minnesota		Minnesota Military Museum; 46.081073°N 94.347034°W	Little Falls	Owned and maintained by Forty and Eight Grand Voiture du Minnesota.
Mississippi		Old GM&O Depot; 32.298546°N 90.179118°W	Jackson	The Museum of Mississippi History has a collection of French gifts from the boxcar.
Missouri		Dakotaland Museum; 38.691700°N 93.259033°W	Sedalia	Owned and maintained by Forty and Eight Voiture 333 of Pettis County.
Montana		Montana Military Museum; 46.622532°N 112.097600°W	Fort Harrison	The Montana Historical Society has a collection of French gifts from the boxcar.
Nebraska		Destroyed		partially scrapped in 1951, remainder converted to shed and destroyed in 1961. The Nebraska Historical Society has a collection of French gifts from the boxcar.
Nevada	Nevada Merci Train car	Nevada State Railroad Museum Boulder City; 35.970306°N 114.856810°W	Boulder City	The Nevada State Museum has a collection of French gifts from the boxcar.
New Hampshire	New Hampshire Merci train car	126 Reed St. 42.996633°N 71.482133°W	Manchester	Saint Anselm College has a collection of gifts from the boxcar.
New Jersey		United Railroad Historical Society of New Jersey	Boonton	Had been missing since 1958, with unverified claims that it had been scrapped, the boxcar was rediscovered in Tennessee by the National World War I Museum and Memorial in 1993, and placed in storage in Kansas City, Missouri. The car was confirmed as the New Jersey boxcar in 2024, and donated to the United Railroad Historical Society of New Jersey, who plans to restore it at their Boonton yard. The New Jersey State Museum has a collection of French gifts from the boxcar.
New Mexico		Expo New Mexico; 35.080554°N 106.570564°W	Albuquerque	The fair grounds has a collection of French gifts from the boxcar.
New York		Utica Union Station; 43.104511°N 75.222940°W	Utica	The Met has a collection of French gifts from the boxcar. Relocated to Utica in 2026.
North Carolina		North Carolina Transportation Museum; 35.687539°N 80.433338°W	Spencer	The North Carolina History Museum has a collection of French gifts from the boxcar.
North Dakota		North Dakota Heritage Center; 46.818435°N 100.779894°W	Bismarck	The State Historical Society of North Dakota has a collection of French gifts from the boxcar.
Ohio		Camp Perry; 41.542523°N 83.020277°W	Near Port Clinton	The Ohio Historical Society has a collection of French gifts from the boxcar.
Oklahoma		J. D. McCarty Center; 35.231790°N 97.409588°W	Norman	The Oklahoma History Center has a collection of French gifts from the boxcar.
Oregon		Simpson Park; 43.415892°N 124.224374°W	North Bend	The Benton County Historical Society has a collection of French gifts from the boxcar.
Pennsylvania		Fort Indiantown Gap; 40.432089°N 76.569960°W	Near Jonestown	The Blair County and Lycoming County historical societies have collections of gifts from the boxcar.
Rhode Island		Museum of Work and Culture; 41.999296°N 71.516107°W	Woonsocket	The museum has a collection of French gifts from the boxcar.
South Carolina		Memorial Park; 34.219331°N 80.247577°W	Bishopville	
South Dakota		State Fairgrounds; 44.363464°N 98.229703°W	Huron	The Dakotaland Museum has a collection of French gifts from the boxcar.
Tennessee		American Legion Post 145; 36.585750°N 82.181491°W	Bristol	The Tennessee State Museum has a collection of French gifts from the boxcar.
Texas		Texas Military Forces Museum; 30.313761°N 97.761278°W	Camp Mabry	The Briscoe History Center has a collection of French gifts from the boxcar.
Utah		Utah State Railroad Museum; 41.222013°N 111.979280°W	Ogden	
Vermont		Vermont National Guard Library and Museum; 44.500439°N 73.157397°W	Colchester	The Vermont Historical Society and the Wood Art Gallery have collections of gifts from the boxcar.
Virginia		Virginia War Museum; 37.019476°N 76.453647°W	Newport News	
Washington		Sarg Hubbard Riverside Park; 46.601932°N 120.474826°W	Yakima	The Karshner Museum has a collection of French gifts from the boxcar.
West Virginia		Veterans' Park; 37.418257°N 81.589946°W	Welch	Tu-Endie-Wei State Park has a collection of French gifts from the boxcar.
Wisconsin		National Railroad Museum; 44.483306°N 88.048000°W	Ashwaubenon	The Hoard Historical Museum and the Wisconsin Historical Society have collections of gifts from the boxcar.
Wyoming		American Legion Post 6; 41.138219°N 104.793853°W	Cheyenne	The Wyoming Museum has a collection of French gifts from the boxcar.
Territory of Hawaii		Hawaiian Railway Society; 21.331897°N 158.046105°W	ʻEwa Beach	
