= Sumter and Choctaw 102 =

Preserved American steam locomotive

Sumter & Choctaw 102
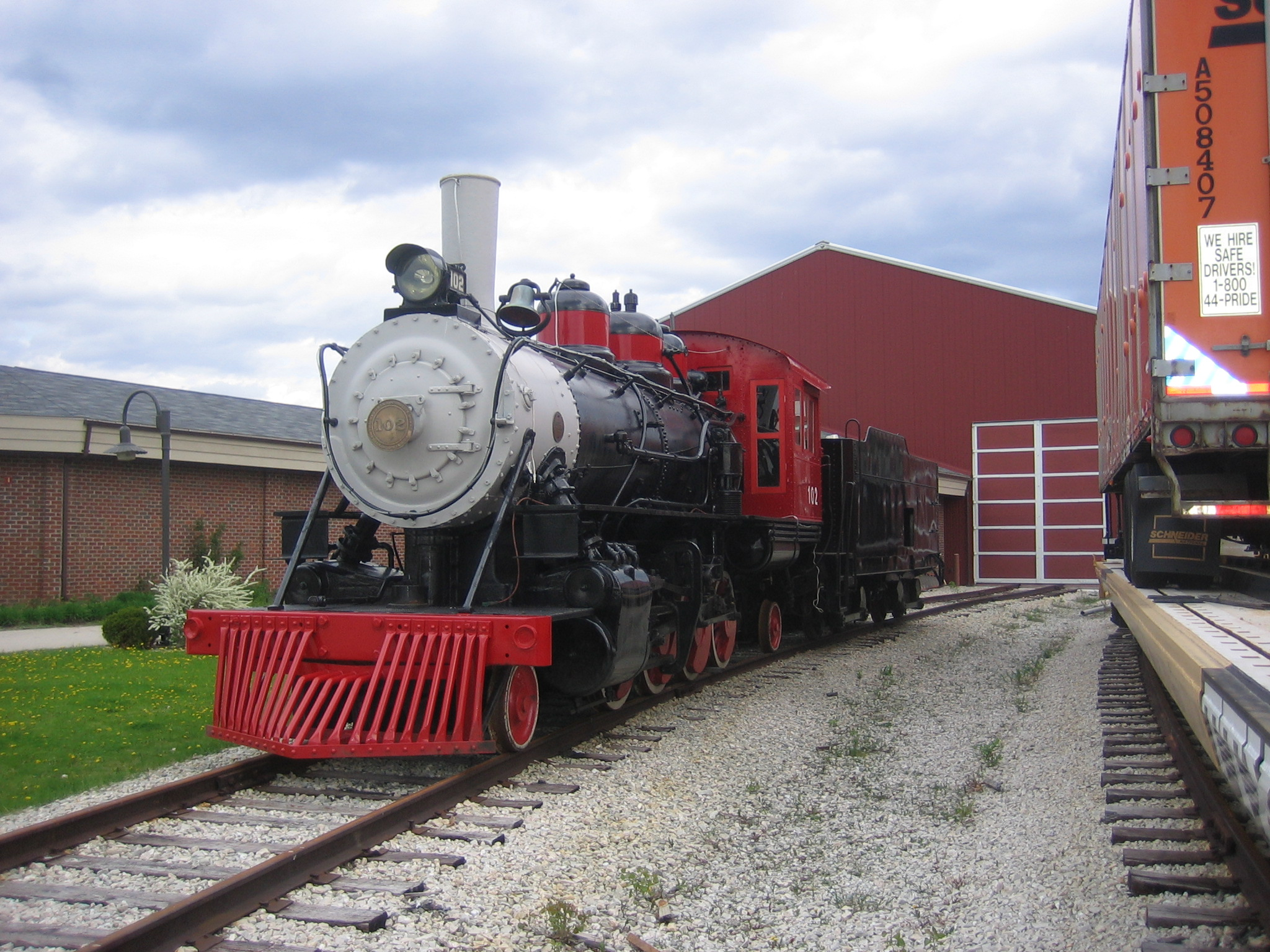
- 102 at the National Railroad Museum, 2009
Type and origin
- Power type: Diesel (formerly steam)
- Builder: Baldwin Locomotive Works
- Serial number: 57778
- Build date: June 1924
Specifications
- Configuration
  - Whyte: 2-8-2
- Gauge: 4 ft 8 1/2 in (1,435 mm)
- Driver dia.: 44 in (1.1 m)
- Adhesive weight: 98,000 lb (44,000 kg)
- Loco weight: 128,000 lb (58,000 kg)
- Fuel type: Coal
- Boiler pressure: 180 psi (1.2 MPa)
- Cylinders: Two, outside
- Cylinder size: 17 in (430 mm) × 24 in (610 mm)
- Valve gear: Walschaerts
- Valve type: Piston valves
- Loco brake: Air
- Train brakes: Air
- Couplers: Knuckle
Performance figures
- Tractive effort: 24,100 lbf (107 kN)
Career
- Operators: Sumter and Choctaw Railway; National Railroad Museum
- Numbers: 102
- Retired: June 1961
- Restored: 1980s
- Current owner: National Railroad Museum
- Disposition: Operational

Sumter and Choctaw 102 is a preserved 2-8-2 "Mikado" type steam locomotive, built in 1924 by the Baldwin Locomotive Works.

== History ==
Sumter and Choctaw No. 102 was built in June 1924 by the Baldwin Locomotive Works (BLW) for the Sumter and Choctaw Railway (S&C) in Bellamy, Alabama. It spent four decades on the Sumter and Choctaw Railway hauling lumber for the Allison Lumber Company, as well as passengers until 1952. It was retired from revenue service in June 1961 due to cracks in the boiler. The railroad subsequently switched to using diesel locomotives, while the other S&C locomotive—numbered 103—was sold to the Empire State Railway Museum.

In 1964, it was donated to the National Railroad Museum by the Marathon Corporation, which owned Allison Lumber. To send the locomotive to Green Bay, Wisconsin, it was transferred on a flatcar over four railroad routes. In the 1980s, the tender of the locomotive was replaced with a tender equipped with two diesel engines, therefore becoming a moving display. In 2007, one of the diesel engines was replaced with a more powerful engine so that it can now pull trains.
