= Forty-and-eights =

Type of French boxcar

Forty-and-Eights
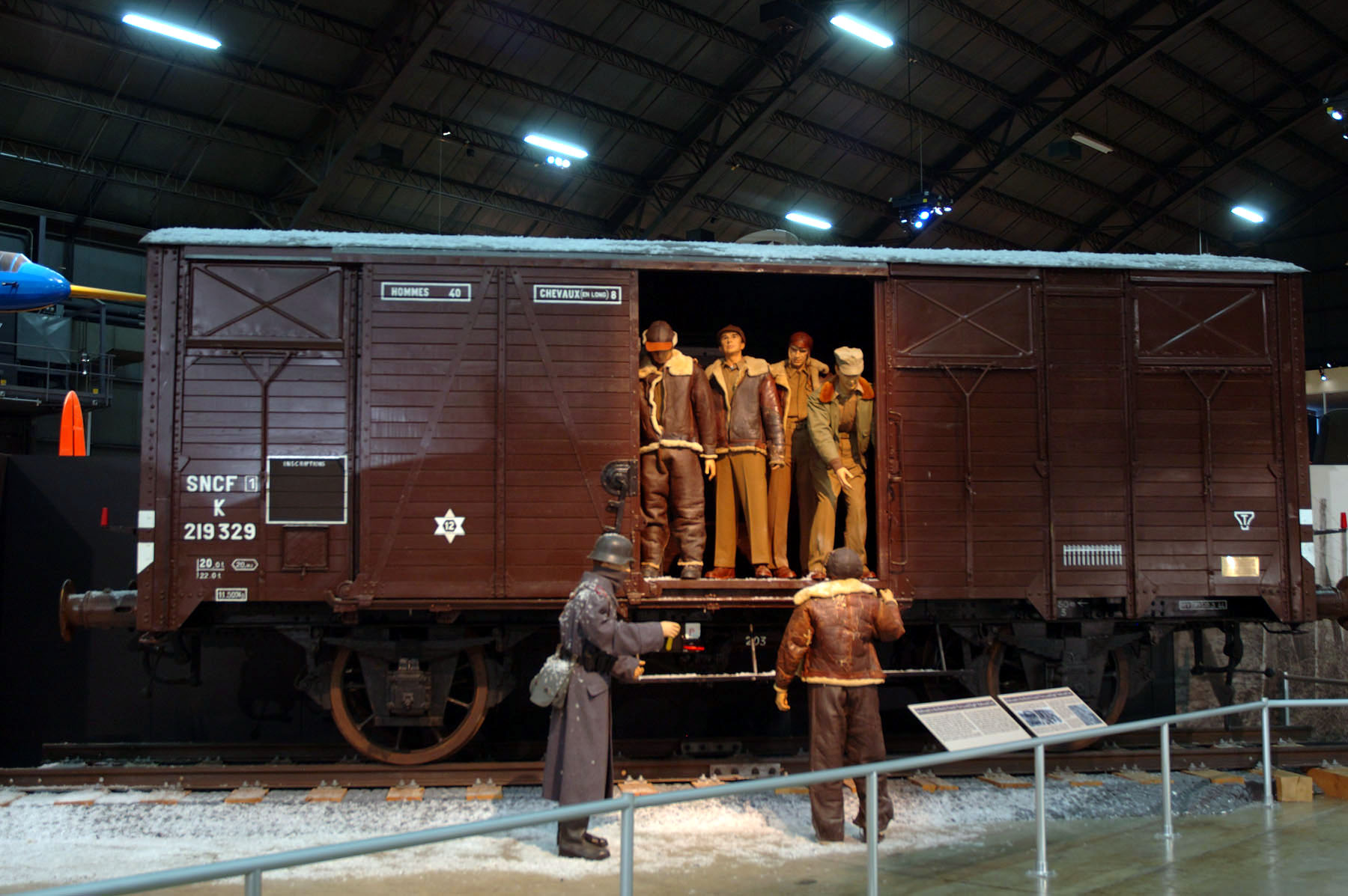
- "Forty and Eight" boxcar at the National Museum of the Air Force at Wright-Patterson Air Force Base
- Capacity: 40 men or 8 horses or 20 tonnes (19.7 long tons; 22.0 short tons) of supplies
- Operators: French Army and Wehrmacht

Specifications
- Weight: 7.9 tonnes (7.8 long tons; 8.7 short tons) tare
- Braking system: Air
- Coupling system: Buffers and chain
- Track gauge: 1,435 mm (4 ft 8 1/2 in)

Forty-and-Eight boxcars (French: Quarante et huit), commonly referred to as Forty-and-Eights, were types of French boxcars (voiture) used by the French Army and Wehrmacht. British and American troops were transported to the Western Front in the boxcars marked with "40-8" to denote their capacity: 40 men or 8 horses.

== History ==
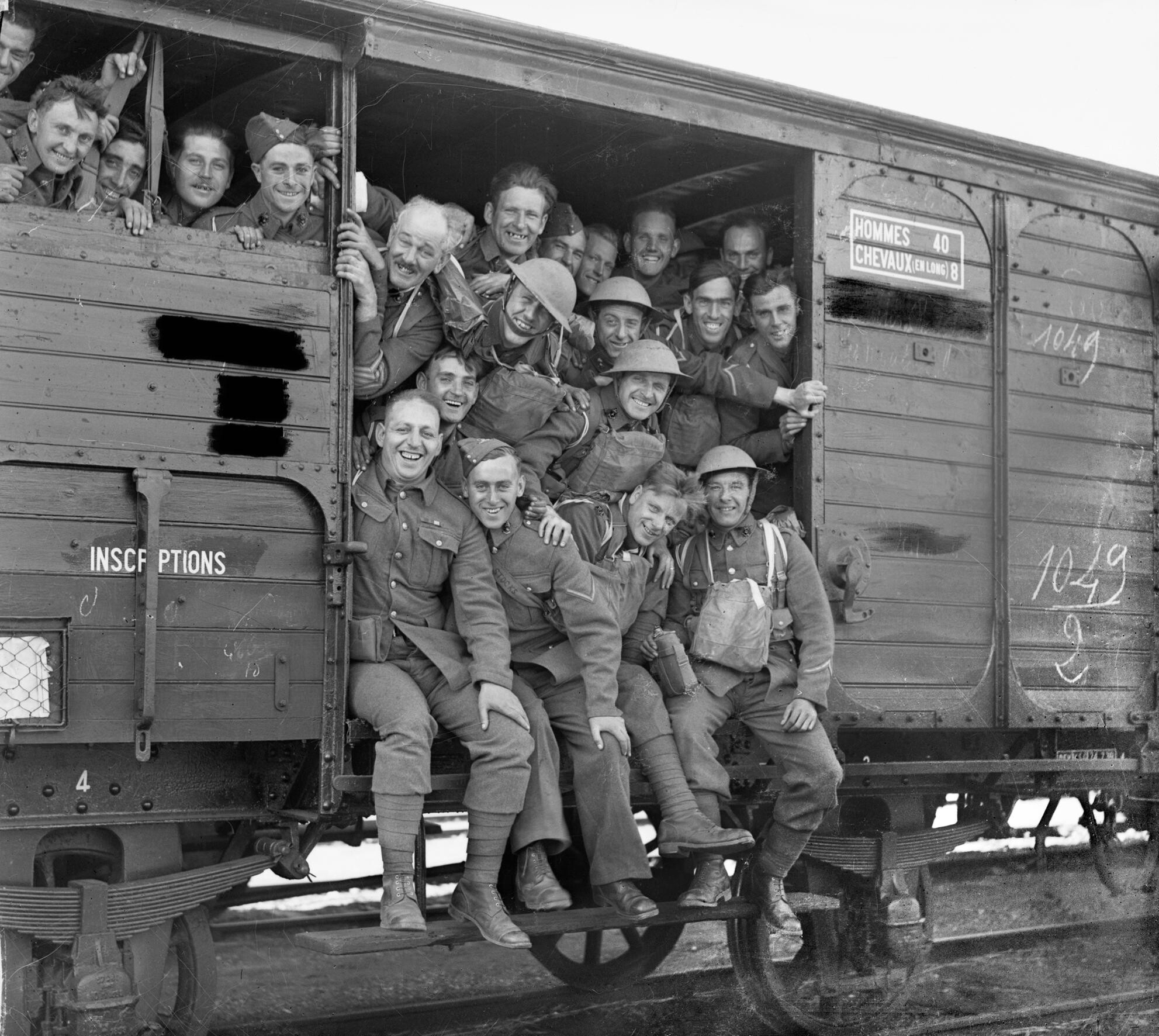
British soldiers in a forty-and-eight in France, 1939

Introduced in the 1870s, the boxcars were pressed into military service by the French Army in both world wars. Between 1940 and 1944 occupying German forces used forty-and-eights to transport troops, POWs, horses, freight, and civilian prisoners to concentration camps. Following the Allied landing at Normandy in June, 1944, the Germans were pushed eastward towards the Rhine. Trains of forty-and-eights were frequent targets of opportunity for Allied fighter-bombers, with carloads of prisoners occasionally being victimized. As France was liberated forty-and-eights were used to transport Allied soldiers and materials to the shifting front through war's end in 1945.

== Merci Train boxcars ==
In 1949, France sent 49 forty-and-eights to the United States laden with donations from citizens of France in thanks for the United States' role in the liberation of France, one for each of the then forty-eight states and one for Washington, D.C., Alaska, and Hawaii to share. Called the Merci Train, it was sent in response to the Friendship Train America had created two years earlier to aid France in the dire immediate aftermath of World War II; 700 boxcars worth of donated supplies were collected and shipped across the Atlantic via donated transport.
