= Friendship Train =

U.S. aid program to France and Italy after World War II

The 1947 U.S. Friendship Train collected foodstuffs from American donors for transport to the people of France and Italy. Contemporaneous with the Marshall Plan, it provided desperately needed assistance in the aftermath of World War II, but was primarily a token gesture of goodwill, with stops across the U.S. ending at New York City, where it was received with a ticker tape parade prior to shipment to Europe.

== Background ==
Washington journalist Drew Pearson proposed the train idea in his daily column "The Merry-Go-Round", and other newspapers around the U.S. took up the cause. Drew Pearson thought that a train, crossing the United States from West to East, and collecting on its way the gifts of the American people to the French people and to the Italian people would not only represent concrete help. This train, which was to be organised outside of the governmental agenda of support, should also be a symbol for the willingness of Americans to help Europe. Everyone was to be given in person the occasion to do something for those who suffered, the occasion, in his own words "to demonstrate the American way to bring democracy to life. Pearson's closest collaborator was his wife Luvie Pearson, who together with him took the lead in the collection and distribution of the goods: "Luvie was the steam that powered the train across the northern United States, and Drew fired up the southern route. Both stopped at every village for contributions. They collected enough food to fill 'two long freight trains.' And then they took it to Europe, with keys to the towns presented at every stop."

== History ==
The train began from Los Angeles on November 7, 1947, and proceeded through Bakersfield, Fresno, Merced, Stockton, Oakland, Sacramento (California), Reno (Nevada), Ogden (Utah), Green River, Rawlins, Laramie, Cheyenne (Wyoming), Sidney, North Platte, Kearney, Grand Island, Fremont, Omaha (Nebraska), Council Bluffs, Boone, Ames, Cedar Rapids, Clinton (Iowa), Sterling, and Chicago (Illinois). From Chicago the main route passed through Fort Wayne (Indiana), Mansfield (Ohio), Pittsburgh, Altoona, Harrisburg, Lancaster, Philadelphia (Pennsylvania), and Trenton (New Jersey) before reaching New York City in 11 days. A northern branch assembled cars of aid as it passed through South Bend and Elkhart (Indiana), Toledo, Cleveland, and Ashtabula (Ohio), Buffalo, Syracuse, Utica, and Albany (New York) before joining the train at New York City.

The project of the friendship train which started in Los Angeles with a spectacular sendoff by Hollywood producers and celebrities instantly became a joint endeavor of the people of the United States: "The governor of distant Hawaii came to transmit, on behalf of his fellow citizens, 72 tons of sugar. The truckers of Los Angeles ensured themselves, free of charge, the transport of the food collected. (...) In Fresno, in the central valley of California, children stopped the train, and presented boxes of milk and cookies. Oakland added seven cars. People lined up for hours to donate money to the 'Friendship Train' fund. The state of North Dakota, located off the route, telegraphed that it was forming a special train, which would connect to Chicago. The railway companies undertook to run trains for free". On its arrival in Chicago on November 14, the train that now consisted of 80 wagons had to continue on three different itineraries, converging at the terminal station in New York. Only one day later, the main line already consisted of 160 wagons. Rumors spread, that the states of the Middle West, formerly bastions of isolationism, and Texas were sending a 12-car train to New York. Finally, on November 18, the main train reached New York, its locomotives towing 240 wagons of food and medicine and being welcomed by a crowd of 25'000 persons. Prior to carrying the first shipload of the train's cargo to Le Havre, France, the United States Lines' American Leader was rechristened the "Friend Ship".

Originally hoped to collect 80 train car loads of food, the train ultimately collected over 700 cars ($40 million value) of food, clothing, and fuel, paid in part by monetary donations. Each parcel that was distributed in Europe was accompanied by a personal message of the American donors:

"On compte dans ce vaste creuset qu'est l'Amérique, bien des races différentes, et bien des fois religieuses. En un esprit de bonne volonté démocratique et chrétienne, nous, Améericains, avons travaillé pour envoyer dans vos foyers ces produits de nos champs. Nous espérons qu'ils vous aideront jusqu'au jour où vos moissons seront à nouveau abondantes et belles."

("In this vast melting pot that is America, there are many different races, and many religious faiths. In a spirit of democratic and Christian goodwill, we Americans have worked to bring these products from our fields to your homes. We hope they will help you until the day when your harvests will be abundant and beautiful again.")

Described at the time as a "token gift", the aid was symbolic of the Marshall Plan effort. The train was described at the time as effective propaganda for the ideological conflict with the Soviet Union, as well as a characteristically Quaker act by Drew Pearson. Roscoe Drummond of the Christian Science Monitor called it "One of the greatest projects ever born of American journalism".

== Merci Train ==
The Friendship Train was reciprocated by the Merci Train, 49 World War I era "forty and eight" box cars gifted to the United States by France, which arrived in New York Harbor on February 2, 1949. Many of the gifts remain on display at local historical societies and museums throughout the U.S.

== In popular culture ==
The phrase has been used more recently for other purposes, such as the 1967 "Friendship Train" from the Ernst Thälmann Pioneer Organisation to the Soviet Union, the 1969 song "Friendship Train" written by Norman Whitfield and performed by Gladys Knight & the Pips, and the "Friendship Train" on which Sergey Abramov led a Chechen delegation to Russia in 2004.

== Further information ==
The Friendship Train (1948), a 14-minute black and white short film occasionally presented on Turner Classic Movies, presents a detailed and moving account of the progress of the train through cities across the U.S.
