= South African type ET1 tender =

Steam locomotive tender in South Africa

Type and origin
- Locomotive: Class 15F
- Designer: South African Railways (M.M. Loubser)
- Builder: South African Railways
- In service: c. 1950
- Rebuilt from: Type ET
Specifications
- Configuration: 2-axle bogies
- Gauge: 3 ft 6 in (1,067 mm) Cape gauge
- Length: 30 ft 9 7/16 in (9,384 mm)
- Wheel dia.: 34 in (864 mm)
- Wheelbase: 20 ft 5 in (6,223 mm)
  - Bogie: 6 ft 2 in (1,880 mm)
- Fuel type: Coal
- Fuel cap.: 16 LT (16.3 t)
- Water cap.: 5,620 imp gal (25,500 L)
- Stoking: Mechanical
- Couplers: Drawbar & AAR knuckle
Career
- Operators: South African Railways

The South African type ET1 tender was a steam locomotive tender.

Type ET1 tenders were modified and reclassified Type ET tenders, which had entered service as tenders to Class 15F 4-8-2 Mountain type steam locomotives in 1947 and 1948. The modification resulted in a tender with a larger coal capacity, but the same water capacity.

== Origin ==
The Type ET tender first entered service in 1947, as tenders to the last batch of 100 Class 15F locomotives to enter service on the South African Railways (SAR). They were built by North British Locomotive Company to designs by Doctor M.M. Loubser, Chief Mechanical Engineer of the SAR from 1939 to 1949, and were equipped with mechanical stokers.

== Modification ==
During the 1950s, some of the Type ET tenders were modified to enlarge their coal bunkers from 14 to 16 long tons (14.2 to 16.3 tonnes) capacity. These modified tenders were designated Type ET1.

== Classification letters ==
Since many tender types are interchangeable between different locomotive classes and types, a tender classification system was adopted by the SAR. The first letter of the tender type indicates the classes of engines to which it can be coupled. The "E_" tenders were arranged with mechanical stokers and could be used with the locomotive classes as shown.

- Class 15F, if equipped with a mechanical stoker.
- Class 23.
- Class 25NC.
- Class 26.

The second letter indicates the tender's water capacity. The "_T" tenders had a capacity of between 5,587 and 6,000 imperial gallons (25,400 and 27,300 litres; 6,710 and 7,210 US gallons).

A number, when added after the letter code, indicates differences between similar tender types, such as function, wheelbase or coal bunker capacity.
