= South African type EW tender =

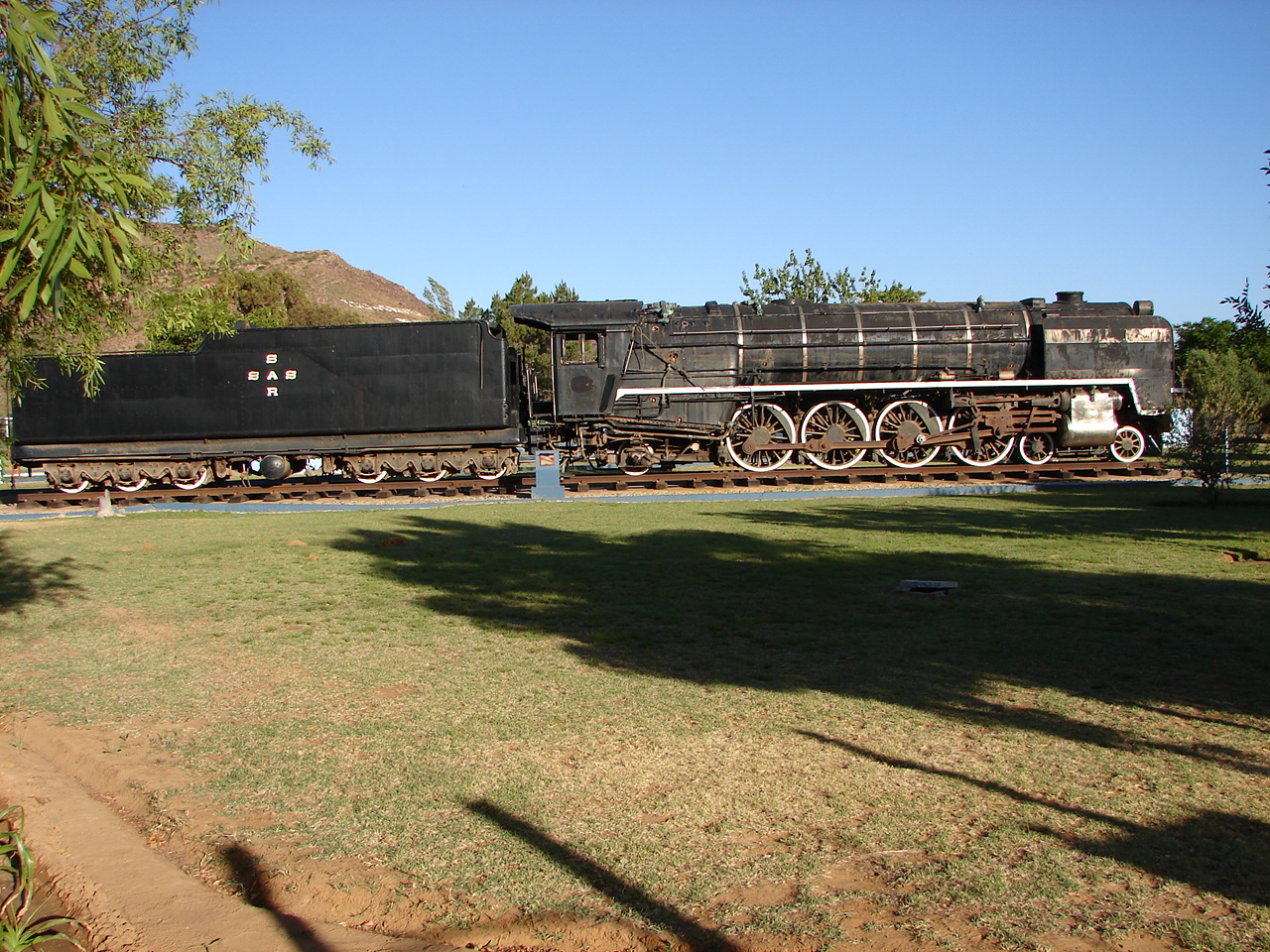
- Type EW tender on Class 23, 8 January 2010
Type and origin
- ♠ Tender numbers 2552-2271 ♥ Tender numbers 3201-3316
- Locomotive: Class 23
- Designer: South African Railways (W.A.J. Day)
- Builder: Berliner Maschinenbau; Henschel and Son
- In service: 1938-1939
- Rebuilder: South African Railways
- Rebuilt to: Water only tender
Specifications
- Configuration: 3-axle bogies
- Gauge: 3 ft 6 in (1,067 mm) Cape gauge
- Length: 42 ft 9 3/4 in (13,049 mm)
- Wheel dia.: 34 in (864 mm)
- Wheelbase: 30 ft 8 in (9,347 mm)
  - Bogie: 8 ft 8 in (2,642 mm)
- Axle load: ♠ 18 LT (18,290 kg) ♥ 17 LT 19 cwt (18,240 kg)
  - Front bogie: ♠ 54 LT 14 cwt (55,580 kg) ♥ 53 LT 17 cwt (54,710 kg)
  - Rear bogie: ♠ 54 LT (54,870 kg) ♥ 53 LT 17 cwt (54,710 kg)
- Weight empty: 105,928 lb (48,048 kg)
- Weight w/o: ♠ 104 LT 5 cwt (105,900 kg) ♥ 107 LT 14 cwt (109,400 kg)
- Fuel type: Coal
- Fuel cap.: 18 LT (18.3 t)
- Water cap.: ♠ 9,200 imp gal (41,800 L) ♥ 9,500 imp gal (43,200 L)
- Stoking: Mechanical
- Couplers: Drawbar & AAR knuckle
Career
- Operators: South African Railways
- Numbers: SAR 2552-2271, 3201-3316

The South African type EW tender was a steam locomotive tender.

Type EW tenders entered service in 1938, as tenders to the Class 23 4-8-2 Mountain type steam locomotives which entered service on the South African Railways in that year.

== Manufacturers ==
Type EW tenders were built in 1938 by Berliner Maschinenbau and Henschel and Son.

The South African Railways (SAR) placed 136 Class 23 locomotives in service in 1938 and 1939. The locomotive and tender was designed by W.A.J. Day, Chief Mechanical Engineer of the South African Railways (SAR) from 1936 to 1939, as a general utility locomotive capable of operating on 80 pounds per yard (40 kilograms per metre) rail.

== Characteristics ==
The tender rode on six-wheeled bogies. To enable longer runs to be undertaken between watering stops in the Karoo and to skip bad watering places, they were the largest tenders to have been used in South Africa up to that time and, as originally designed, would have had a water capacity of 10,000 imperial gallons (45,500 litres) and a coal capacity of 18 long tons (18.3 tonnes). Owing to axle load restrictions, however, it was necessary to reduce the water capacity to 9,200 imperial gallons (41,800 litres). The first batch of twenty locomotives were delivered with such tenders.

The second batch of 116 locomotives were delivered with tenders of which the underframe was modified. To improve the weight distribution, both bogie pivot centres were relocated 6 inches (152 millimetres) towards the rear. This enabled the water capacity to be increased to 9,500 imperial gallons (43,200 litres) on these 116 tenders.

Four vacuum cylinders operated clasp brakes on all tender wheels and a hand brake was included. Since experience showed that a firegrate of 63 square feet (5.9 square metres) cannot be served effectively under all conditions by manual stoking, particularly on long runs, a mechanical stoker was fitted. The mechanical stoker's engine was mounted on the tender.

== Locomotives ==
Only Class 23 locomotives were delivered new with Type EW tenders, which were numbered in the ranges from 2552 to 2271 and 3201 to 3316 for their engines. An oval number plate, bearing the engine number and often also the locomotive class and tender type, was attached to the rear end of the tenders.

When the Class 23 were withdrawn, many of their Type EW tenders were coupled to Class 15F locomotives to increase their range.

== Classification letters ==
Since many tender types are interchangeable between different locomotive classes and types, a tender classification system was adopted by the SAR. The first letter of the tender type indicates the classes of engines to which it can be coupled. The "E_" tenders were arranged with mechanical stokers and could be used with the locomotive classes as shown.

- Class 15F, if equipped with a mechanical stoker.
- Class 23.
- Class 25NC.
- Class 26.

The second letter indicates the tender's water capacity. The "_W" tenders had a capacity of between 9,200 and 10,000 imperial gallons (41,800 and 45,500 litres; 11,000 and 12,000 US gallons).

== Modification ==
At least one of the tenders, no. 3209, was later rebuilt to a water-only tender.

== Illustration ==
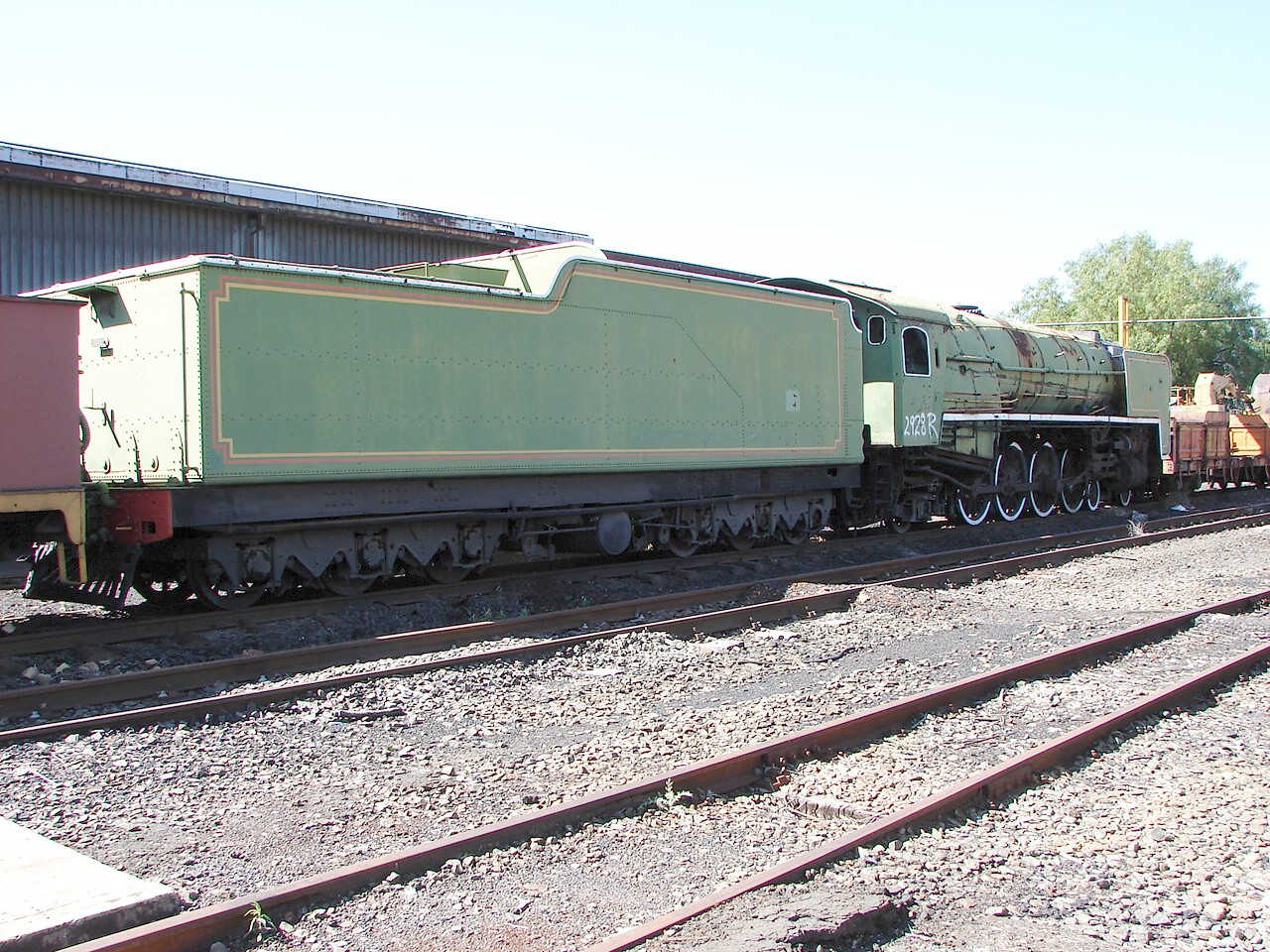
Type EW tender on Class 15F, 14 October 2009

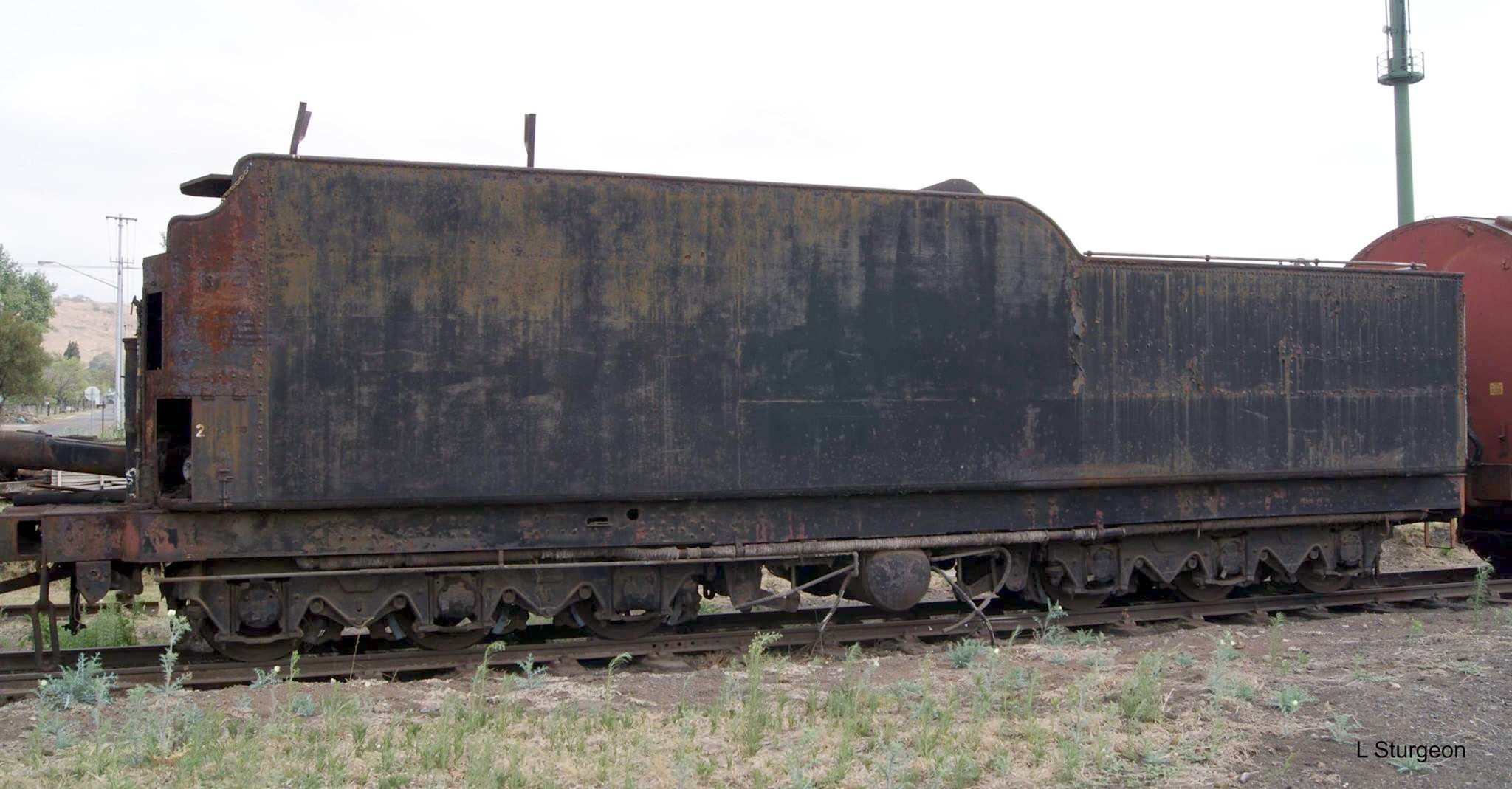
Type EW tender, side view, c. 2016

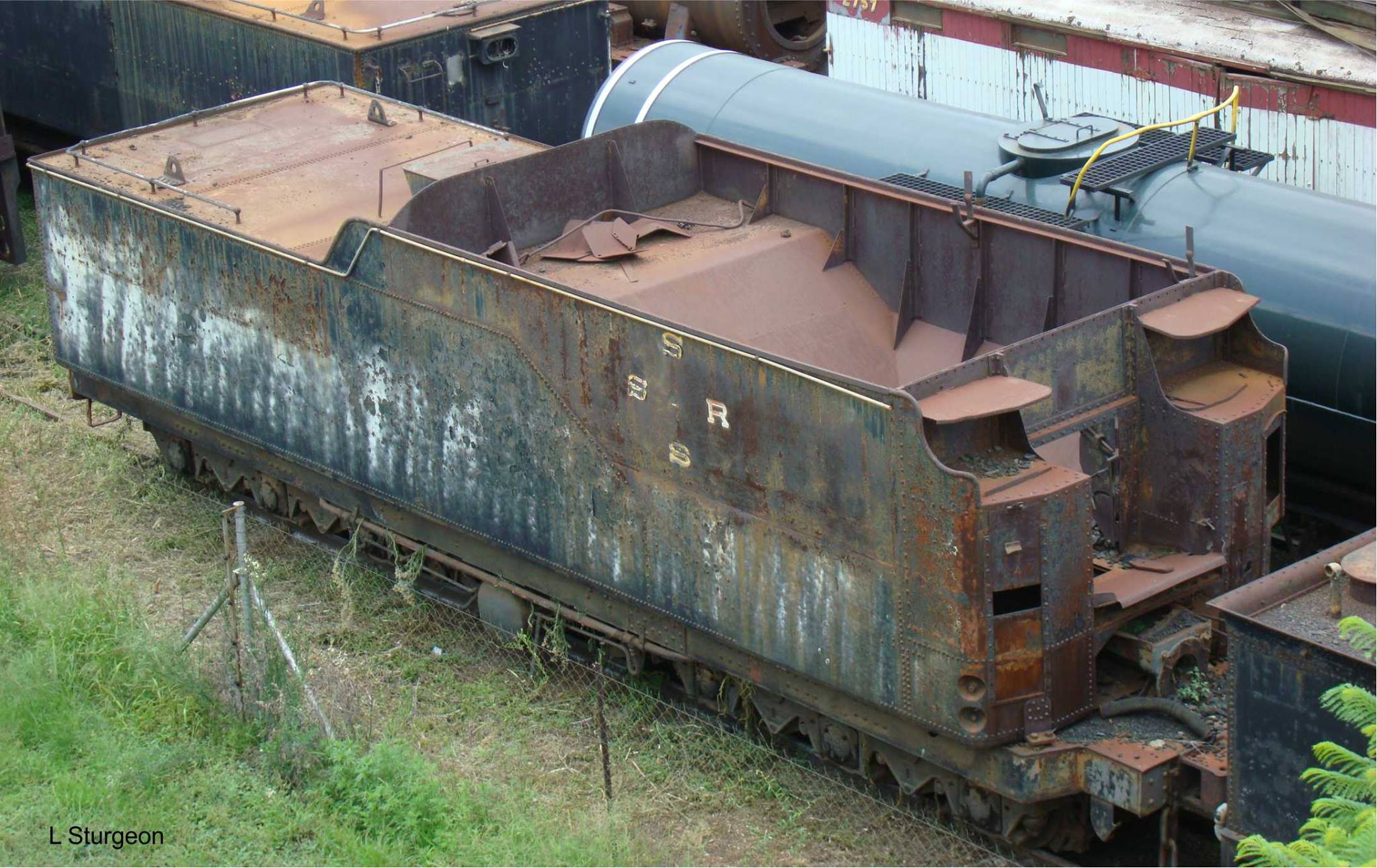
Type EW tender, overhead view, c. 2016

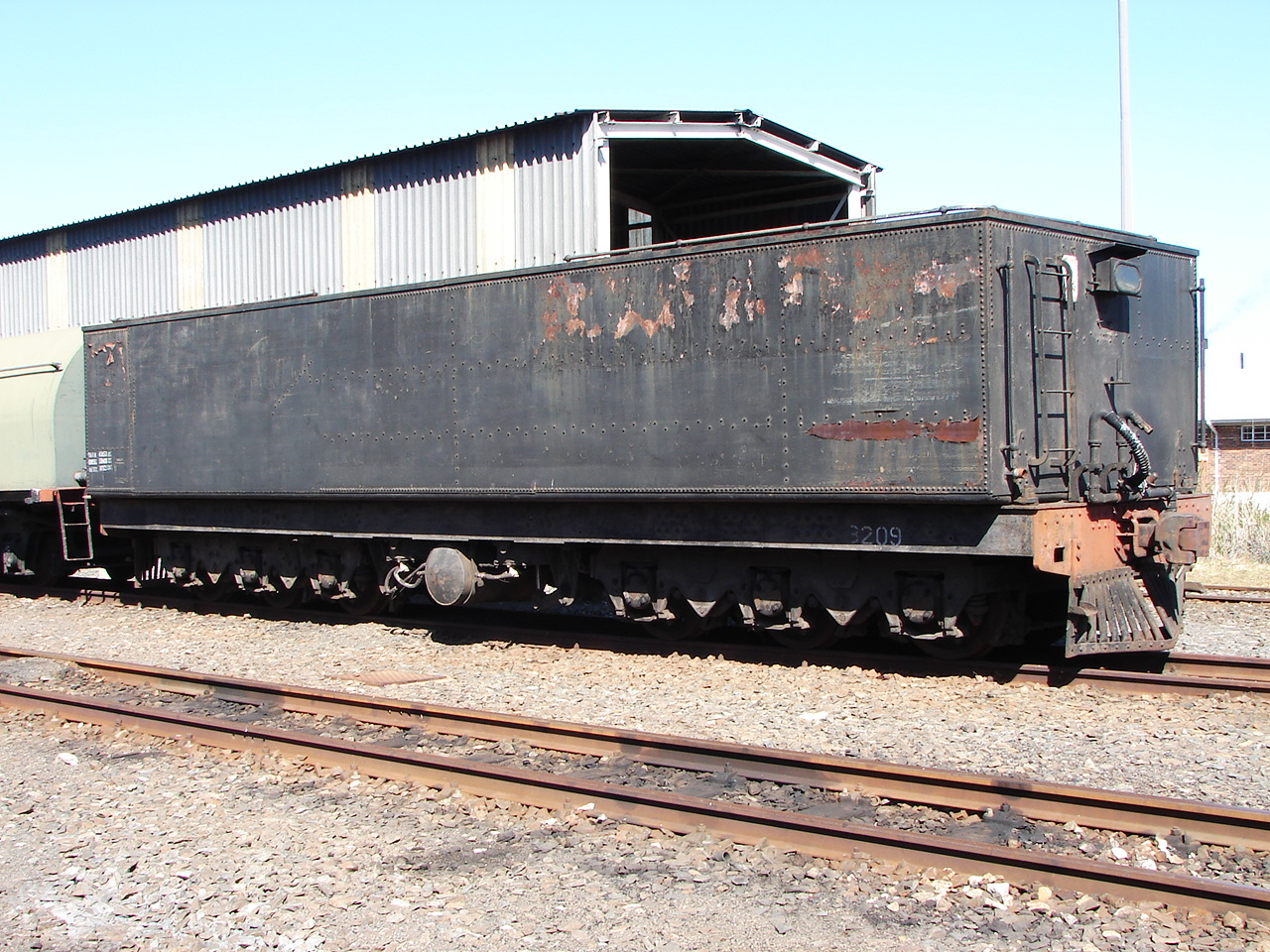
No. 3209 rebuilt to water only tender, 20 October 2009
