= South African Class 15F 4-8-2 =

1938 design of steam locomotive

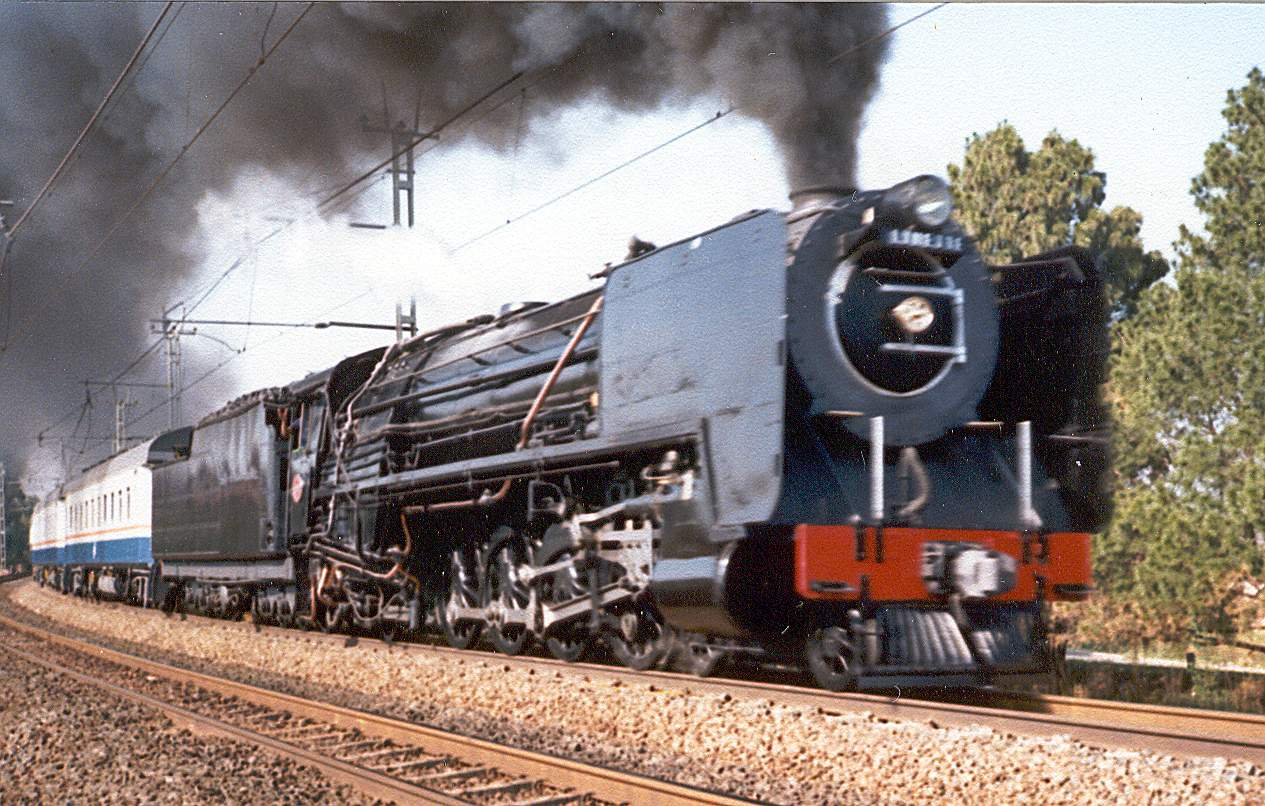
- 2940 Lynette on the Johannesburg-Magaliesburg line, 6 April 1992
Type and origin
- ♠ Numbers 2902-2915 & 2917-2966 - ♥ Number 2916 ♣ Numbers 2967-3056 - ♦ Numbers 3057-3156
- Power type: Steam
- Designer: South African Railways
- Builder: Berliner Maschinenbau; Henschel & Son; North British Locomotive Company; Beyer, Peacock & Company
- Order number: BP 1554, 1555
- Serial number: Berliner 10820-10826; Henschel 23932-23945; NBL 24463-24506, 25536-25595, 25941-26040; BP 7082-7111
- Model: Class 15F
- Build date: 1938-1947
- Total produced: 255
Specifications
- Configuration
  - Whyte: 4-8-2
- Driver: 2nd coupled axle
- Gauge: 3 ft 6 in (1,067 mm) Cape gauge
- Leading dia.: 30 in (762 mm)
- Coupled dia.: 60 in (1,524 mm)
- Trailing dia.: 34 in (864 mm)
- Tender wheels: 34 in (864 mm) all
- Minimum curve: 275 ft (84 m)
- Wheelbase: JT, ET: 65 ft 6 3/16 in (19,969 mm)
  - Engine: 35 ft 8 in (10,871 mm)
  - Leading: 6 ft 10 in (2,083 mm)
  - Coupled: 15 ft 9 in (4,801 mm)
  - Tender: JT: 20 ft 5 in (6,223 mm); JV: 24 ft 11 in (7,595 mm); ET: 20 ft 5 in (6,223 mm); EW: 30 ft 8 in (9,347 mm)
  - Tender bogie: JT, ET: 6 ft 2 in (1,880 mm); EW: 8 ft 8 in (2,642 mm)
- Length
  - Over couplers: JT, ET: 73 ft 5 15/16 in (22,401 mm)
- Width: 10 ft (3,048 mm)
- Height: 12 ft 11 1/2 in (3,950 mm)
- Frame type: Bar
- Axle load: ♠ 18 LT 2 cwt (18,390 kg) ♥ 18 LT 8 cwt (18,700 kg) ♣ 18 LT 19 cwt (19,250 kg) ♦ 18 LT 15 cwt (19,050 kg)
  - Leading: ♠ 20 LT (20,320 kg) ♥ 19 LT 7 cwt (19,660 kg) ♣ 20 LT 12 cwt (20,930 kg) ♦ 20 LT 10 cwt (20,830 kg)
  - 1st coupled: ♠ 17 LT 15 cwt (18,030 kg) ♥ 18 LT 1 cwt (18,340 kg) ♣ 18 LT 19 cwt (19,250 kg) ♦ 18 LT 10 cwt (18,800 kg)
  - 2nd coupled: ♠ 18 LT 2 cwt (18,390 kg) ♥ 18 LT 8 cwt (18,700 kg) ♣ 18 LT 13 cwt (18,950 kg) ♦ 18 LT 15 cwt (19,050 kg)
  - 3rd coupled: ♠ 18 LT 2 cwt (18,390 kg) ♥ 18 LT 8 cwt (18,700 kg) ♣ 18 LT 13 cwt (18,950 kg) ♦ 18 LT 15 cwt (19,050 kg)
  - 4th coupled: ♠ 17 LT 15 cwt (18,030 kg) ♥ 18 LT 1 cwt (18,340 kg) ♣ 18 LT 9 cwt (18,750 kg) ♦ 18 LT 10 cwt (18,800 kg)
  - Trailing: ♠ 16 LT 18 cwt (17,170 kg) ♥ 16 LT (16,260 kg) ♣ 18 LT 5 cwt (18,540 kg) ♦ 18 LT 6 cwt (18,590 kg)
  - Tender bogie: Bogie 1: JT: 33 LT 18 cwt (34,440 kg); ET: 33 LT 18 cwt (34,440 kg); EW: 54 LT 14 cwt (55,580 kg); Bogie 2: JT: 35 LT 10 cwt (36,070 kg); ET: 35 LT 10 cwt (36,070 kg); EW: 54 LT (54,870 kg)
  - Tender axle: JT: 17 LT 15 cwt (18,030 kg); JV: 14 LT 18 cwt (15,140 kg); ET: 17 LT 15 cwt (18,030 kg); EW: 18 LT (18,290 kg)
- Adhesive weight: ♠ 71 LT 14 cwt (72,850 kg) ♥ 72 LT 18 cwt (74,070 kg) ♣ 74 LT 14 cwt (75,900 kg) ♦ 74 LT 10 cwt (75,700 kg)
- Loco weight: ♠ 108 LT 12 cwt (110,300 kg) ♥ 108 LT 5 cwt (110,000 kg) ♣ 113 LT 11 cwt (115,400 kg) ♦ 113 LT 6 cwt (115,100 kg)
- Tender weight: JT: 69 LT 8 cwt (70,510 kg); JV: 78 LT (79,250 kg); ET: 69 LT 8 cwt (70,510 kg); EW: 107 LT 14 cwt (109,400 kg)
- Total weight: ♠JT 178 LT (180,900 kg) ♥JT 177 LT 13 cwt (180,500 kg) ♠JV 186 LT 12 cwt (189,600 kg) ♥JV 186 LT 5 cwt (189,200 kg) ♣JT 182 LT 19 cwt (185,900 kg) ♦ET 182 LT 14 cwt (185,600 kg) ♦EW 221 LT (224,500 kg)
- Tender type: ♠♥♣ JT (2-axle bogies) ♠♥♣ JV (2-8-2) ♦ ET (2-axle bogies) ♦ EW (3-axle bogies)
- Fuel type: Coal
- Fuel capacity: JT: 14 LT (14.2 t); JV: 15 LT (15.2 t); ET: 14 LT (14.2 t); EW: 18 LT (18.3 t)
- Water cap.: JT: 6,000 imp gal (27,300 L); JV: 7,250 imp gal (33,000 L); ET: 5,620 imp gal (25,500 L); EW: 9,200 to 9,500 imp gal (41,800 to 43,200 L)
- Firebox
  - Type: Round-top
  - Grate area: ♠♥♦ 63 sq ft (5.9 m^{2}) ♣ 62.5 sq ft (5.81 m^{2})
- Boiler
  - Model: Watson Standard no. 3B
  - Type: Domeless
  - Pitch: 9 ft 2 1/2 in (2,807 mm)
  - Diameter: 6 ft 2 1/4 in (1,886 mm)
  - Tube plates: 22 ft 6 in (6,858 mm)
  - Small tubes: 136: 2 1/2 in (64 mm)
  - Large tubes: 36: 5 1/2 in (140 mm)
- Boiler pressure: 210 psi (1,448 kPa)
- Safety valve: Ross-pop
- Heating surface
  - Firebox: 206 sq ft (19.1 m^{2})
  - Tubes: ♠♥♦ 3,168 sq ft (294.3 m^{2}) ♣ 3,179 sq ft (295.3 m^{2})
  - Arch tubes: 26 sq ft (2.4 m^{2})
  - Total surface: ♠♥♦ 3,400 sq ft (320 m^{2}) ♣ 3,414.5 sq ft (317.22 m^{2})
- Superheater
  - Heating area: ♠♥♦ 676 sq ft (62.8 m^{2}) ♣ 661 sq ft (61.4 m^{2})
- Cylinders: Two
- Cylinder size: 24 in (610 mm) bore 28 in (711 mm) stroke
- Valve gear: Walschaerts
- Valve type: Piston
- Loco brake: Pre-war: Steam; Post-war: Vacuum
- Couplers: AAR knuckle
Performance figures
- Tractive effort: 42,340 lbf (188.3 kN) @ 75%
- Factor of adh.: 3•86
Career
- Operators: South African Railways
- Class: Class 15F
- Number in class: 255
- Numbers: 2902–3156
- Delivered: 1938-1948
- First run: 1938
- Withdrawn: 1980s

The South African Railways Class 15F 4-8-2 of 1938 is a steam locomotive.

The Class 15F was the most numerous steam locomotive class in South African Railways service. Between 1938 and 1948, 255 of these locomotives with a 4-8-2 Mountain type wheel arrangement entered service.

== Manufacturers ==
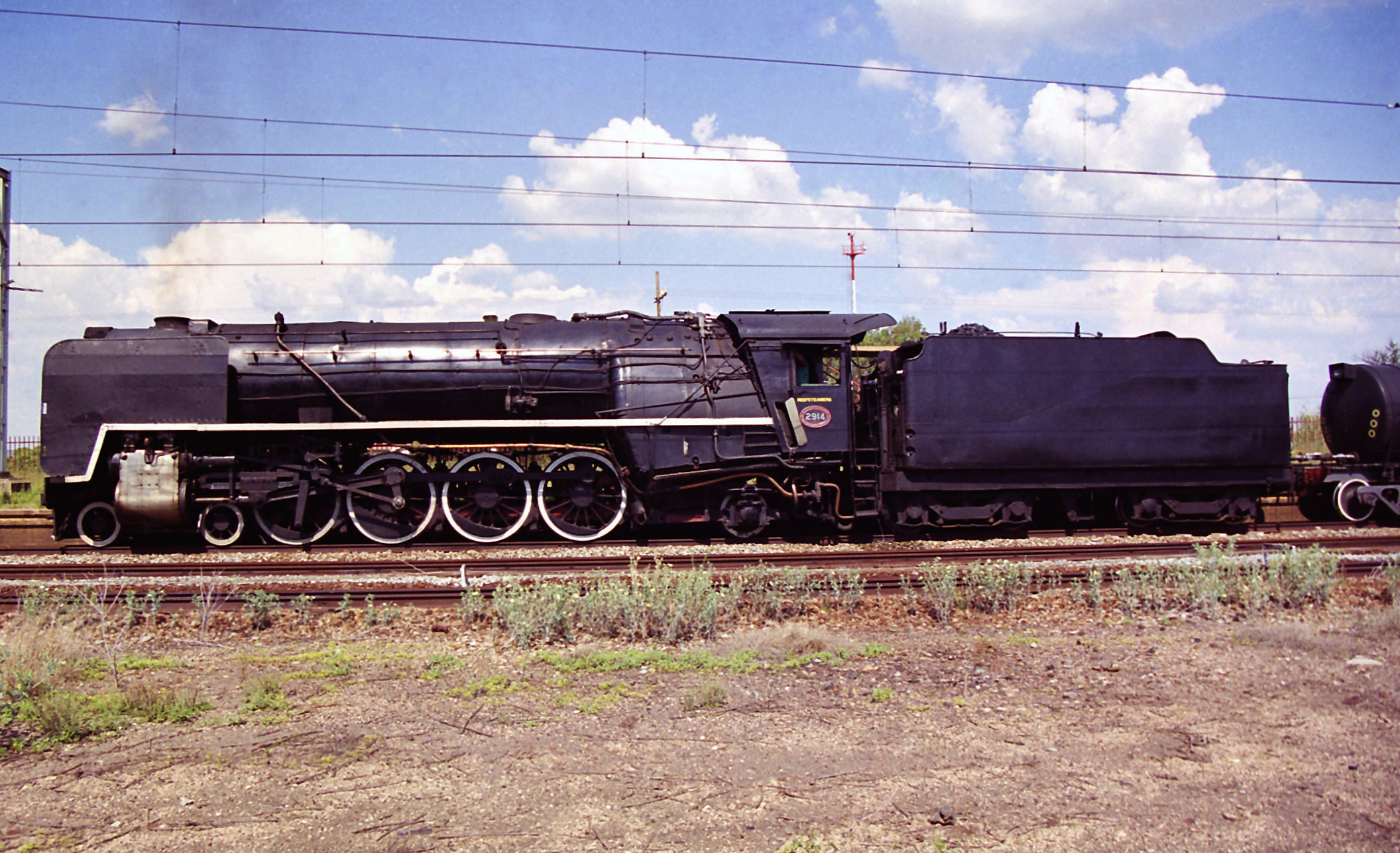
Preserved hand-fired Henschel-built no. 2914 Spikkels of Reefsteamers with a Type JT tender, 22 May 2014

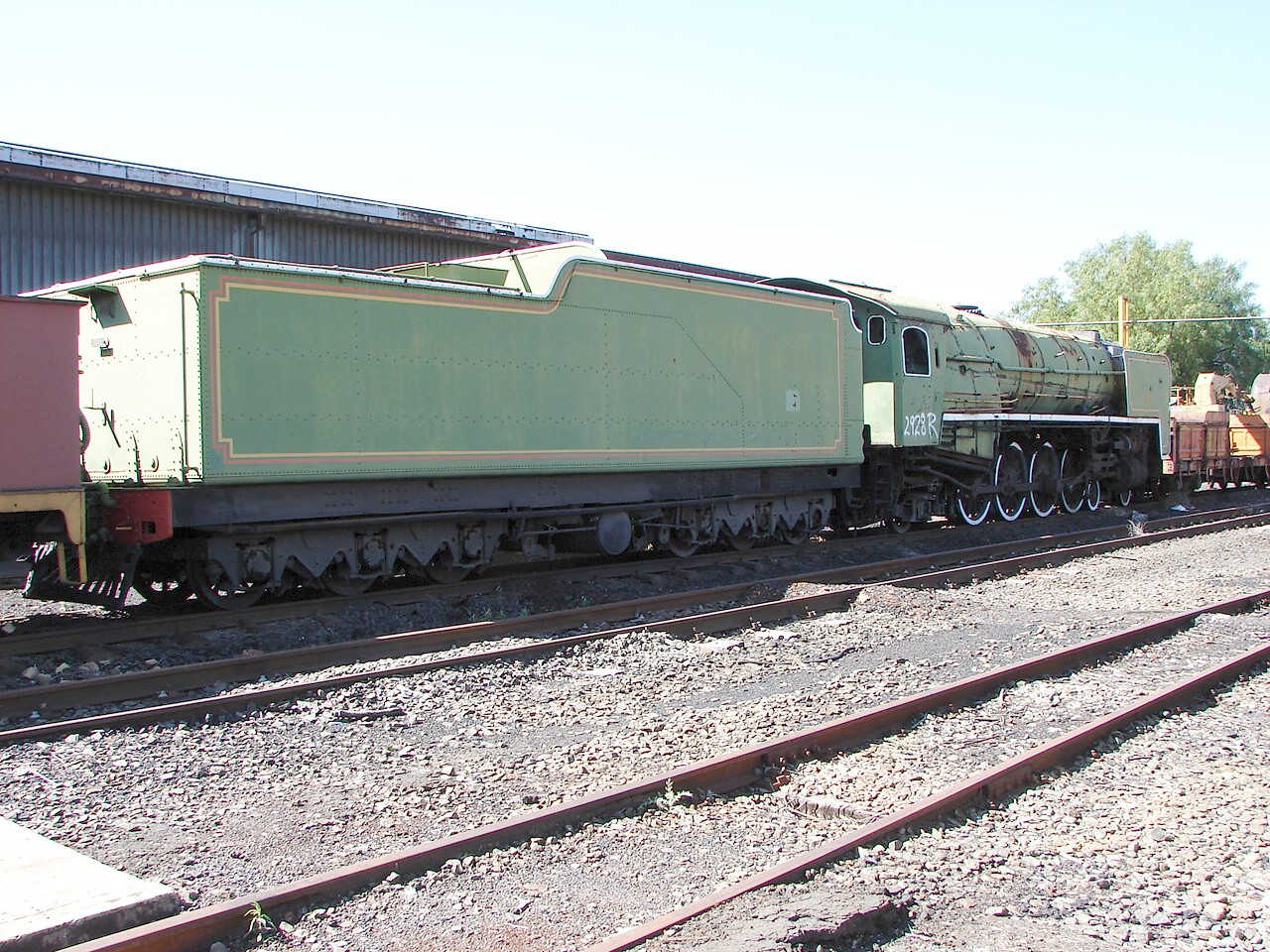
Pre-war NBL-built no. 2928 with a Type EW tender, Bloemfontein, Free State, 14 October 2009

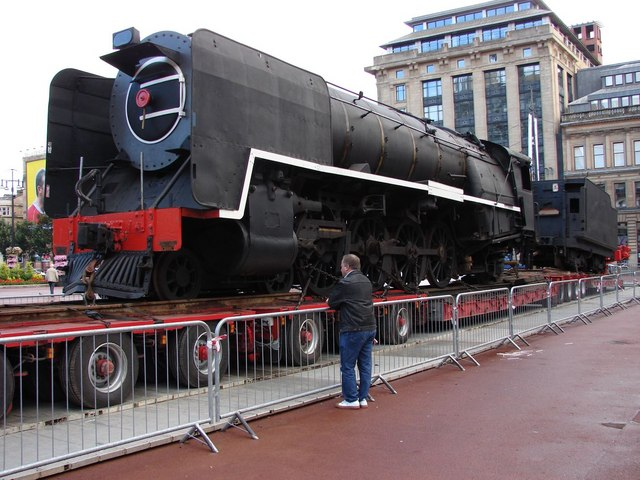
Post-war NBL-built no. 3007 with a Type ET tender arriving at George Square in Glasgow, 25 August 2007

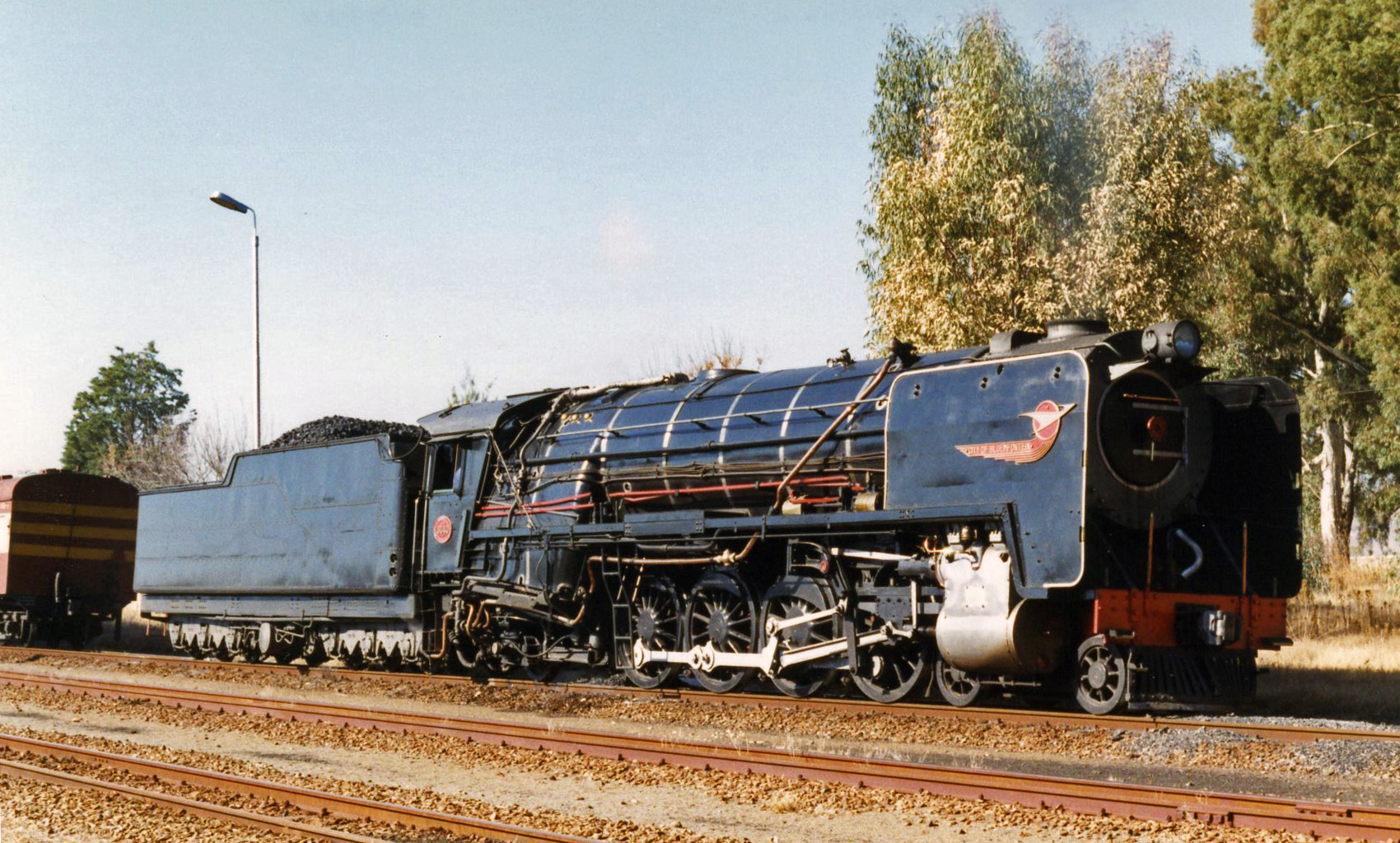
Post-war NBL-built no. 3040 with an ex Class 23 Type EW tender at Clocolan, Free State Province, 9 July 1999

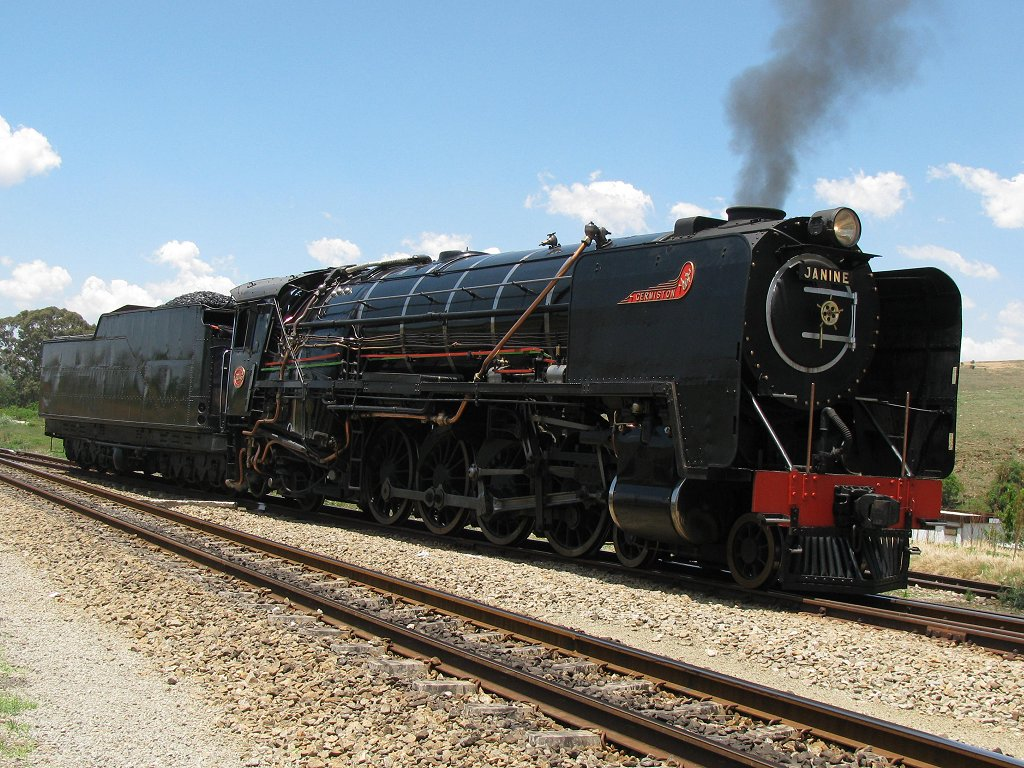
Post-war NBL-built no. 3046 with a Type EW tender at Magaliesburg, Gauteng, 30 October 2010

The Class 15F 4-8-2 Mountain type steam locomotive was designed by W.A.J. Day, Chief Mechanical Engineer (CME) of the South African Railways (SAR) from 1936 to 1939, based on the design of the Class 15E by his predecessor, Allan Griffiths Watson, and later modified again by his successor, M.M. Loubser. It was built in five batches by four locomotive manufacturers in Germany and the United Kingdom over a period of ten years spanning World War II.

- The first 21 were built in Germany in 1938. Seven were delivered by Berliner Maschinenbau, numbered in the range from 2902 to 2908, and fourteen by Henschel & Son, numbered in the range from 2909 to 2922.
- Another 44 were built by the North British Locomotive Company (NBL) of Glasgow in 1938. They were delivered in 1939, numbered in the range from 2923 to 2966.
- Locomotive building was interrupted by World War II, but because of a critical motive power shortage that developed in South Africa during the war, manufacturing of the Class 15F was resumed even before hostilities had ceased. In 1944, production started on thirty locomotives by Beyer, Peacock & Company (BP), delivered later that same year and numbered in the range from 2967 to 2996.
- In 1945, sixty were built and delivered by NBL, numbered in the range from 2997 to 3056.
- The final batch of 100 Class 15Fs were built by NBL in 1946 and 1947 and delivered between 1946 and 1948, numbered in the range from 3057 to 3156.

== Lineage ==
The Class 15F represented the ultimate stage in a long history of development spanning thirty years. The first Class 15 4-8-2 tender locomotive entered SAR service in 1914. It sported a 40 square feet (3.7 square metres) grate, a boiler pressure of 185 pounds per square inch (1,276 kilopascals), a maximum axle load of 16 long tons 10 hundredweight (16,760 kilograms) and 57 inches (1,448 millimetres) diameter coupled wheels. Later models incorporated major improvements in succession, until the Class 15CA was commissioned in 1926 with a 48 square feet (4.5 square metres) grate, a boiler pressure of 210 pounds per square inch (1,448 kilopascals), a maximum axle load of 17 long tons 15 hundredweight (18,030 kilograms) and 60 inches (1,524 millimetres) diameter coupled wheels.

== Characteristics ==
The Class 15F locomotive was similar to its predecessor Class 15E, but it was built with Walschaerts valve gear as specified by Day, who was not a protagonist of rotary cam poppet valve gear. This and some other differences led to these engines being designated Class 15F. The locomotives used Stone's electric lighting, with a 150 watt Tonum E type headlight, cab lighting which included a light over the reversing controls, a bunker light and rear headlights on the tender. The locomotive was capable of traversing curves of 275 feet (84 metres) radius with 3/4 inch (19 millimetres) gauge widening.

The Class 15F was delivered with a Watson Standard no. 3B boiler and a Watson cab. During the 1930s, Day's predecessor as CME, A.G. Watson, designed a standard boiler type as part of his standardisation policy. Many serving locomotives were reboilered with these Watson Standard boilers and in the process most of them were also equipped with Watson cabs with their distinctive slanted fronts, compared to the conventional vertical fronts of their original cabs. New locomotives that were acquired in the Watson era and later, such as the Class 15F, were built with such boilers and cabs.

To fit within the loading gauge, the Watson Standard no. 3B boiler was domeless. The maximum height of the locomotive was 12 feet 11 1/2 inches (3,950 millimetres), the maximum width 10 feet (3,048 millimetres) and the length over coupler faces 73 ft 5 15/16 in (22,401 mm).

The pre-war locomotives were equipped with two large inclined Ross-pop safety valves, mounted on the upper sides of the boiler just ahead of the firebox and aimed about 80 degrees apart. When these inclined valves blew off under a station canopy, bystanders often received a shower of slimy wet soot. After the war, they were replaced by four smaller Ross-pop valves at the highest point of the boiler that blew off straight up.

The cylinder barrels had cast iron liners. The valve gear, brake gear and the hubs on the coupled wheels were fitted with soft grease lubricating nipples while the bronze axle boxes and connecting and coupling rods had hard grease lubrication. The leading and trailing wheels were fitted with roller bearings. The axle boxes and motion were similar to those of the Classes 15CA and 23 and were interchangeable in most cases. The weight of the reciprocating parts on each side of the engine was 1,273 pounds (577 kilograms), of which 20% was balanced to ensure that the hammer blow per wheel would not exceed 1 long ton 12 hundredweight (1.6 tonnes) at 55 miles per hour (89 kilometres per hour) and with the overbalance equally divided on all the coupled wheels.

=== Pre-war models ===
The pre-war Class 15Fs were manually stoked and were delivered without smoke deflectors. The original 21 Berliner- and Henschel-built engines remained hand-fired for the full duration of their working lives. On the pre-war NBL-built engines, on the other hand, provision was made in the design to later convert them to mechanical stoking. A mechanical stoker was tested on no. 2923 before the remaining locomotives of that group were all equipped with such stokers by the late 1940s. Their brake systems consisted of steam brakes on the engines and vacuum brakes on the tenders.

One of the Henschel-built locomotives, no. 2916, is documented as having had a lighter all-up weight and different axle loads than the rest of the engines from the same batch, although its adhesive weight was more than a ton heavier. While sources are silent on the reason for the differences, it is known that this engine was oil-fired, although it is not clear whether it was delivered as an oil-burner or modified post-delivery.

=== Post-war models ===
The post-war locomotives were built to the design and specifications of Dr. M.M. Loubser, who succeeded Day as CME in 1939. His specifications included mechanical stokers, vacuum brakes on the coupled wheels as well as the tenders, with two 24 inches (610 millimetres) diameter brake cylinders on the engine and two 21 inches (533 millimetres) diameter cylinders on the tender, and elephant-ear smoke deflectors instead of smokebox handrails.

The engine's vacuum brake cylinders were fitted outside the main frames under the running boards on each side, between the second and third pairs of coupled wheels. The vacuum brake operated automatically whenever the train brakes were applied. The use of vacuum braking instead of steam braking became standard practice on locomotives built from 1944 onwards and was welcomed by SAR drivers, who were always reluctant to make use of steam brakes for fear of skidding the coupled wheels. In practice, the trigger on the steam brake attachment to isolate the proportional device which admitted steam to the brake cylinder automatically upon the application of the vacuum brake, was invariably wedged down with a wooden peg by drivers to eliminate the steam brake entirely.

Loubser also modified the leading bogie to have swing links with three-point suspension which eliminated the side control springs that were used on earlier versions. As a unit, the modified bogie was interchangeable with those of earlier versions and with those of the Classes 15E and 23. The leading bogie had a side-play of 8 inches (203 millimetres) while the trailing Bissel truck had a side-play of 9 3/8 inches (238 millimetres).

The engines from Beyer, Peacock were war-time austerity models on which planished steel boiler lagging was replaced by ordinary steel lagging, while cosmetic dressing items like stainless steel lagging bands, chrome-plated handrails and rounded corners on the front of the firebox lagging were absent or replaced by unplated items. While the boiler barrels of the pre-war engines were of nickel steel, the austerity locomotives had boiler barrels made of carbon steel with steel plates of 1/16 inch (2 millimetres) greater thickness. When it was subsequently found that the increased thickness was unnecessary, 13/16 inch (21 millimetres) thick carbon steel plates were used on later orders, the same thickness as earlier used with nickel steel plates, which resulted in a desirable reduction in axle loads.

Like the pre-war NBL-built engines, the early post-war locomotives built by BP and NBL in 1944 and 1945 were delivered with Type JT tenders which had a 14 long tons (14.2 tonnes) coal capacity and a 6,000 imperial gallons (27,300 litres) water capacity. As delivered, they were arranged for manual stoking, but with provision made in their design for their subsequent conversion to mechanical stoking. All these locomotives were equipped with mechanical stokers post-delivery.

The locomotives in the final batch of 100 that were received from NBL in 1947 and 1948, numbers 3057 to 3156, were delivered new complete with mechanical stokers. These engines were delivered with Type ET tenders, which also had a 14 long tons (14.2 tonnes) coal capacity, but a smaller 5,620 imperial gallons (25,500 litres) water capacity to accommodate the mechanical stoker mechanism, while its empty weight was 1,232 pounds (559 kilograms) more due to the additional stoking equipment. These appear to have been the only differences between the Types JT and ET tenders. Apart from these differences, the post-war locomotives were identical to the earlier ones. Elephant ear smoke deflectors were later installed on the pre-war locomotives as well.

== Locomotive naming ==
Although the naming of locomotives in South Africa dates back to the Cape Town Railway & Dock 0-4-2 locomotives of 20 March 1860 and the Natal Railway's 0-4-0WT Natal of 13 May 1860, it was rarely done. In 1945, the Minister of Transport at the time, the Honourable F. C. Sturrock MP, instructed that a number of Classes 15F and 23 engines should be named after various South African cities and towns and fitted with suitable nameplates in both official languages. The decorative plates were fitted to the sides of the smokebox or to the elephant ear smoke deflectors of engines which were so equipped. Twelve Class 15F locomotives were named.

- 3044 Kroonstad
- 3045 Harrismith
- 3046 City of Bloemfontein
- 3047 City of Pretoria
- 3049 City of Johannesburg
- 3050 Springs
- 3051 Vereeniging
- 3052 Brakpan
- 3053 Benoni
- 3054 Bethlehem
- 3055 Germiston
- 3056 Potchefstroom

In later years, some of these names migrated to other engines and classes, with several eventually ending up on Classes 23 and 25NC locomotives.

A 1/1.44th scale of the Class 15F was built by W R Collyer in the 1970s named Kloof. This is one of the largest working scaled models of the Class 15F. It is now in preservation in the United Kingdom.

== Service ==
While the Class 15F was used predominantly in the Orange Free State and Western Transvaal, it also saw service in every system country-wide, including Garratt territory in Natal where it was used on the line from Newcastle to Utrecht.

During 1947 King George VI, accompanied by Queen Elizabeth and the Princesses Elizabeth and Margaret, visited the British territories in Southern Africa. The Royal Visit began in Cape Town on 17 February. Transport during the Royal Visit was aboard the Royal Train of the SAR, hauled by selected British-built locomotives. Class 15F no. 3030 took the Royal Train on its first leg, departing from Table Bay Harbour's Duncan Dock in Cape Town on 21 February. The same locomotive was also in charge of the train's last leg two months and 10,000 miles (16,093 kilometres) later, when it brought the Royal Train back to Duncan Dock.

On the Western Transvaal System, the Class 15F was for many years the mainstay of mainline steam at Germiston, working to Witbank, Volksrust and Kroonstad. In 1956 it was decided to temporarily allocate thirty Class GMA Garratts to the Witbank-Germiston section during the transition period from steam to electric working. This released thirty Class 15Fs for the Orange Free State, of which thirteen were required for increases in traffic and seventeen to replace seventeen Class 23s, required for increases in traffic on the Cape Northern System.

In February 1957, the Cape Midland System received its first two Class 15F locomotives, transferred from the Cape Western System's Paarden Eiland shed to Sydenham in Port Elizabeth. By July 1957 there were nine at Sydenham, three at Cradock and one at Noupoort. There was a brief period when both Systems were using Class 15Fs on the mainline. On the Midland, several of the locomotives were equipped with chimney cowls from 1960 onwards to ease the smoke nuisance for footplatemen in the many tunnels, but these were of dubious effectiveness.

By late 1959, the fast Natal-bound passenger trains were worked from Germiston to Volksrust by Class 31-000 or Class 32-000 diesel-electrics, but the lesser passenger trains were still being worked by Volksrust-based Class 15Fs. By mid-1965, the Volksrust locomotives were transferred back to the Germiston shed upon completion of the electrification of the Natal mainline.

The Class 15F also briefly served on the Cape Eastern system when some worked out of East London in the early 1960s.

Some briefly served outside South Africa's borders. In 1978, six Class 15Fs 3000, 3031, 3066, 3072, 3094, 3126 were hired to Rhodesia Railways, but they were returned nine months later and replaced by Class GMAM Garratts.

When the Class 23 was withdrawn, many of the Class 15F locomotives that were equipped with mechanical stokers inherited their huge twelve-wheel Type EW tenders which, apart from increasing their range with its larger fuel and water capacity, also greatly enhanced their appearance. In later years when the Class 15F was relegated to heavy shunting and local work, many of the locomotives had their mechanical stokers removed.

== Commemoration ==
A 40c postage stamp depicting a Class 15F locomotive was one of a set of four commemorative postage stamps that were issued by the South African Post Office on 27 April 1983 to commemorate the steam locomotives of South Africa, which were rapidly being withdrawn from service at the time. The artwork and stamp design was by the noted stamp designer and artist Hein Botha. The particular locomotive depicted was NBL-built Class 15F no. 2954. The outline of a traditional SAR locomotive number plate was used as a commemorative cancellation for De Aar on the date of release.

== Preservation ==
Given its usefulness and the large quantity placed in service with the SAR, there were many efforts to save a significant number at the end of the steam era. About 60 survived into the 21st century, most still owned by the Transnet Heritage Fund (THF). Since the year 2000, many have now been scrapped with more scrapping expected, especially those stored at Millsite (Krugersdorp) which have been stripped by thieves. This is a list of what remains as of January 2019.

Number (*23 class tender)	Works nmr	THF / Private	Leaselend / Owner	Current Location	Outside South Africa	Current Fate
2902	Berliner 10820	THF		Krugersdorp Locomotive Depot		
2908	Berliner 10826	THF		Krugersdorp Locomotive Depot		Partly Scrapped
2909	Hensc 23932	THF		Waterval-Boven Locomotive Depot		
2910	Hensc 23933	Private	Sandstone Estate	Sandstone Estate		
2913	Hensc 23936	THF		Krugersdorp Locomotive Depot		
2914	Hensc 23937	THF		Germiston Locomotive Depot		
2916	Hensc 23939	THF		Cape Town Station		
2929	NBL 24468	THF		Krugersdorp Locomotive Depot		Partly Scrapped
2934	NBL 24474	THF		Krugersdorp Locomotive Depot		
2936	NBL 24476	THF		Krugersdorp Locomotive Depot		
2940*	NBL 24480	THF		Krugersdorp Locomotive Depot		
2958	NBL 24498	Private		Kimberley Locomotive Depot		
2976*	BP 7091	Private	Ian Welch	Bloemfontein Locomotive Depot		
2985*	BP 7100	THF		Waterval-Boven Locomotive Depot		
2994	BP 7109	THF	Kleinplasie Museum	Worcester (RSA)		
3001	NBL 25540	THF		Krugersdorp Locomotive Depot		
3007	NBL 25546	Private	North British Locomotive Preservation	Riverside Museum	Scotland	
3016*	NBL 25555	THF		Germiston Locomotive Depot		
3040*	NBL 25579	THF		Bloemfontein Locomotive Depot		
3046*	NBL 25585	THF		Germiston Locomotive Depot		
3052*	NBL 25591	Private	Sandstone Estate	Sandstone Estate		
3075	NBL 25959	THF		Krugersdorp Locomotive Depot		
3079	NBL 25964	THF		Krugersdorp Locomotive Depot		
3094*	NBL 25978	THF	Wonder Steam Trains	Hermanstad (Station)		
3098*	NBL 25982	THF		Krugersdorp Locomotive Depot		
3103*	NBL 25987	THF		Krugersdorp Locomotive Depot		
3117	NBL 26001	THF	Wonder Steam Trains	Hermanstad (station)		
3135*	NBL 26019	THF		Germiston Locomotive Depot		
3149*	NBL 26033	Private	Railway Society of South Africa (RSSA)	Masons Mill Locomotive Depot		
3153*	NBL 26040	Private	Grant Bradley	Epping mark (Cape Town)		

No. 3052 Avril formerly owned by the artist David Shepherd, now owned by Sandstone and in the custody of Reefsteamers was loaned out to Friends of the Rail (FOTR). It was derailed near Cullinan on 21 March 2017 while working an FOTR train following the theft of some 250 metres of rail. Damage was minimal, mainly being confined to the destruction of the cowcatcher. However, the loan was terminated and the locomotive returned to the custody of Reefsteamers at Germiston before moving by road to the Sandstone farm.

In 2006, NBL-built no. 3007 was returned to its builder's home city, Glasgow in Scotland, where it was initially put on static display in George Square for fundraising purposes by the North British Locomotive Preservation Group. The move of no. 3007 from staging in the Bloemfontein locomotive depot to Glasgow was recorded in Season 3 of the television documentary series Monster Moves in 2008. The locomotive was originally to have been trucked to Durban by Moveright International, but the transporter was not capable of carrying the locomotive. Instead, it was towed by rail on a two-day journey across the country, with ten flat wagons used to augment the braking capacity of the locomotives which hauled the Class 15F. The locomotive now resides in the Glasgow Museum of Transport's collection at the new Riverside Museum.

== Works numbers ==
The table shows the Class 15F engine numbers, builders, years built and works numbers.

Class 15F 4-8-2 Builders & Works Numbers
SAR No.	Builder	Year	Works No.
2902	Berliner	1938	10820
2903	Berliner	1938	10821
2904	Berliner	1938	10822
2905	Berliner	1938	10823
2906	Berliner	1938	10824
2907	Berliner	1938	10825
2908	Berliner	1938	10826
2909	Henschel	1938	23932
2910	Henschel	1938	23933
2911	Henschel	1938	23934
2912	Henschel	1938	23935
2913	Henschel	1938	23936
2914	Henschel	1938	23937
2915	Henschel	1938	23938
2916	Henschel	1938	23939
2917	Henschel	1938	23940
2918	Henschel	1938	23941
2919	Henschel	1938	23942
2920	Henschel	1938	23943
2921	Henschel	1938	23944
2922	Henschel	1938	23945
2923	NBL	1938	24463
2924	NBL	1938	24464
2925	NBL	1938	24465
2926	NBL	1938	24466
2927	NBL	1938	24467
2928	NBL	1938	24468
2929	NBL	1938	24469
2930	NBL	1938	24470
2931	NBL	1938	24471
2932	NBL	1938	24472
2933	NBL	1938	24473
2934	NBL	1938	24474
2935	NBL	1938	24475
2936	NBL	1938	24476
2937	NBL	1938	24477
2938	NBL	1938	24478
2939	NBL	1938	24479
2940	NBL	1938	24480
2941	NBL	1938	24481
2942	NBL	1938	24482
2943	NBL	1938	24483
2944	NBL	1938	24484
2945	NBL	1938	24485
2946	NBL	1938	24486
2947	NBL	1938	24487
2948	NBL	1938	24488
2949	NBL	1938	24489
2950	NBL	1938	24490
2951	NBL	1938	24491
2952	NBL	1938	24492
2953	NBL	1938	24493
2954	NBL	1938	24494
2955	NBL	1938	24495
2956	NBL	1938	24496
2957	NBL	1938	24497
2958	NBL	1938	24498
2959	NBL	1938	24499
2960	NBL	1938	24500
2961	NBL	1938	24501
2962	NBL	1938	24502
2963	NBL	1938	24503
2964	NBL	1938	24504
2965	NBL	1938	24505
2966	NBL	1938	24506
2967	BP	1944	7082
2968	BP	1944	7083
2969	BP	1944	7084
2970	BP	1944	7085
2971	BP	1944	7086
2972	BP	1944	7087
2973	BP	1944	7088
2974	BP	1944	7089
2975	BP	1944	7090
2976	BP	1944	7091
2977	BP	1944	7092
2978	BP	1944	7093
2979	BP	1944	7094
2980	BP	1944	7095
2981	BP	1944	7096
2982	BP	1944	7097
2983	BP	1944	7098
2984	BP	1944	7099
2985	BP	1944	7100
2986	BP	1944	7101
2987	BP	1944	7102
2988	BP	1944	7103
2989	BP	1944	7104
2990	BP	1944	7105
2991	BP	1944	7106
2992	BP	1944	7107
2993	BP	1944	7108
2994	BP	1944	7109
2995	BP	1944	7110
2996	BP	1944	7111
2997	NBL	1945	25536
2998	NBL	1945	25537
2999	NBL	1945	25538
3000	NBL	1945	25539
3001	NBL	1945	25540
3002	NBL	1945	25541
3003	NBL	1945	25542
3004	NBL	1945	25543
3005	NBL	1945	25544
3006	NBL	1945	25545
3007	NBL	1945	25546
3008	NBL	1945	25547
3009	NBL	1945	25548
3010	NBL	1945	25549
3011	NBL	1945	25550
3012	NBL	1945	25551
3013	NBL	1945	25552
3014	NBL	1945	25553
3015	NBL	1945	25554
3016	NBL	1945	25555
3017	NBL	1945	25556
3018	NBL	1945	25557
3019	NBL	1945	25558
3020	NBL	1945	25559
3021	NBL	1945	25560
3022	NBL	1945	25561
3023	NBL	1945	25562
3024	NBL	1945	25563
3025	NBL	1945	25564
3026	NBL	1945	25565
3027	NBL	1945	25566
3028	NBL	1945	25567
3029	NBL	1945	25568
3030	NBL	1945	25569
3031	NBL	1945	25570
3032	NBL	1945	25571
3033	NBL	1945	25572
3034	NBL	1945	25573
3035	NBL	1945	25574
3036	NBL	1945	25575
3037	NBL	1945	25576
3038	NBL	1945	25577
3039	NBL	1945	25578
3040	NBL	1945	25579
3041	NBL	1945	25580
3042	NBL	1945	25581
3043	NBL	1945	25582
3044	NBL	1945	25583
3045	NBL	1945	25584
3046	NBL	1945	25585
3047	NBL	1945	25586
3048	NBL	1945	25587
3049	NBL	1945	25588
3050	NBL	1945	25589
3051	NBL	1945	25590
3052	NBL	1945	25591
3053	NBL	1945	25592
3054	NBL	1945	25593
3055	NBL	1945	25594
3056	NBL	1945	25595
3057	NBL	1946	25941
3058	NBL	1946	25942
3059	NBL	1946	25943
3060	NBL	1946	25944
3061	NBL	1946	25945
3062	NBL	1946	25946
3063	NBL	1946	25947
3064	NBL	1946	25948
3065	NBL	1946	25949
3066	NBL	1946	25950
3067	NBL	1946	25951
3068	NBL	1946	25952
3069	NBL	1946	25953
3070	NBL	1946	25954
3071	NBL	1946	25955
3072	NBL	1946	25956
3073	NBL	1946	25957
3074	NBL	1946	25958
3075	NBL	1946	25959
3076	NBL	1946	25960
3077	NBL	1946	25961
3078	NBL	1946	25962
3079	NBL	1946	25963
3080	NBL	1946	25964
3081	NBL	1946	25965
3082	NBL	1946	25966
3083	NBL	1946	25967
3084	NBL	1946	25968
3085	NBL	1946	25969
3086	NBL	1946	25970
3087	NBL	1946	25971
3088	NBL	1946	25972
3089	NBL	1946	25973
3090	NBL	1946	25974
3091	NBL	1946	25975
3092	NBL	1946	25976
3093	NBL	1946	25977
3094	NBL	1946	25978
3095	NBL	1946	25979
3096	NBL	1946	25980
3097	NBL	1946	25981
3098	NBL	1946	25982
3099	NBL	1946	25983
3100	NBL	1946	25984
3101	NBL	1946	25985
3102	NBL	1946	25986
3103	NBL	1946	25987
3104	NBL	1946	25988
3105	NBL	1946	25989
3106	NBL	1946	25990
3107	NBL	1946	25991
3108	NBL	1946	25992
3109	NBL	1946	25993
3110	NBL	1946	25994
3111	NBL	1946	25995
3112	NBL	1946	25996
3113	NBL	1946	25997
3114	NBL	1946	25998
3115	NBL	1946	25999
3116	NBL	1946	26000
3117	NBL	1946	26001
3118	NBL	1946	26002
3119	NBL	1946	26003
3120	NBL	1946	26004
3121	NBL	1946	26005
3122	NBL	1946	26006
3123	NBL	1946	26007
3124	NBL	1947	26008
3125	NBL	1947	26009
3126	NBL	1947	26010
3127	NBL	1947	26011
3128	NBL	1947	26012
3129	NBL	1947	26013
3130	NBL	1947	26014
3131	NBL	1947	26015
3132	NBL	1947	26016
3133	NBL	1947	26017
3134	NBL	1947	26018
3135	NBL	1947	26019
3136	NBL	1947	26020
3137	NBL	1947	26021
3138	NBL	1947	26022
3139	NBL	1947	26023
3140	NBL	1947	26024
3141	NBL	1947	26025
3142	NBL	1947	26026
3143	NBL	1947	26027
3144	NBL	1947	26028
3145	NBL	1947	26029
3146	NBL	1947	26030
3147	NBL	1947	26031
3148	NBL	1947	26032
3149	NBL	1947	26033
3150	NBL	1947	26034
3151	NBL	1947	26035
3152	NBL	1947	26036
3153	NBL	1947	26037
3154	NBL	1947	26038
3155	NBL	1947	26039
3156	NBL	1947	26040
