= South African Class 23 4-8-2 =

1938 design of steam locomotive

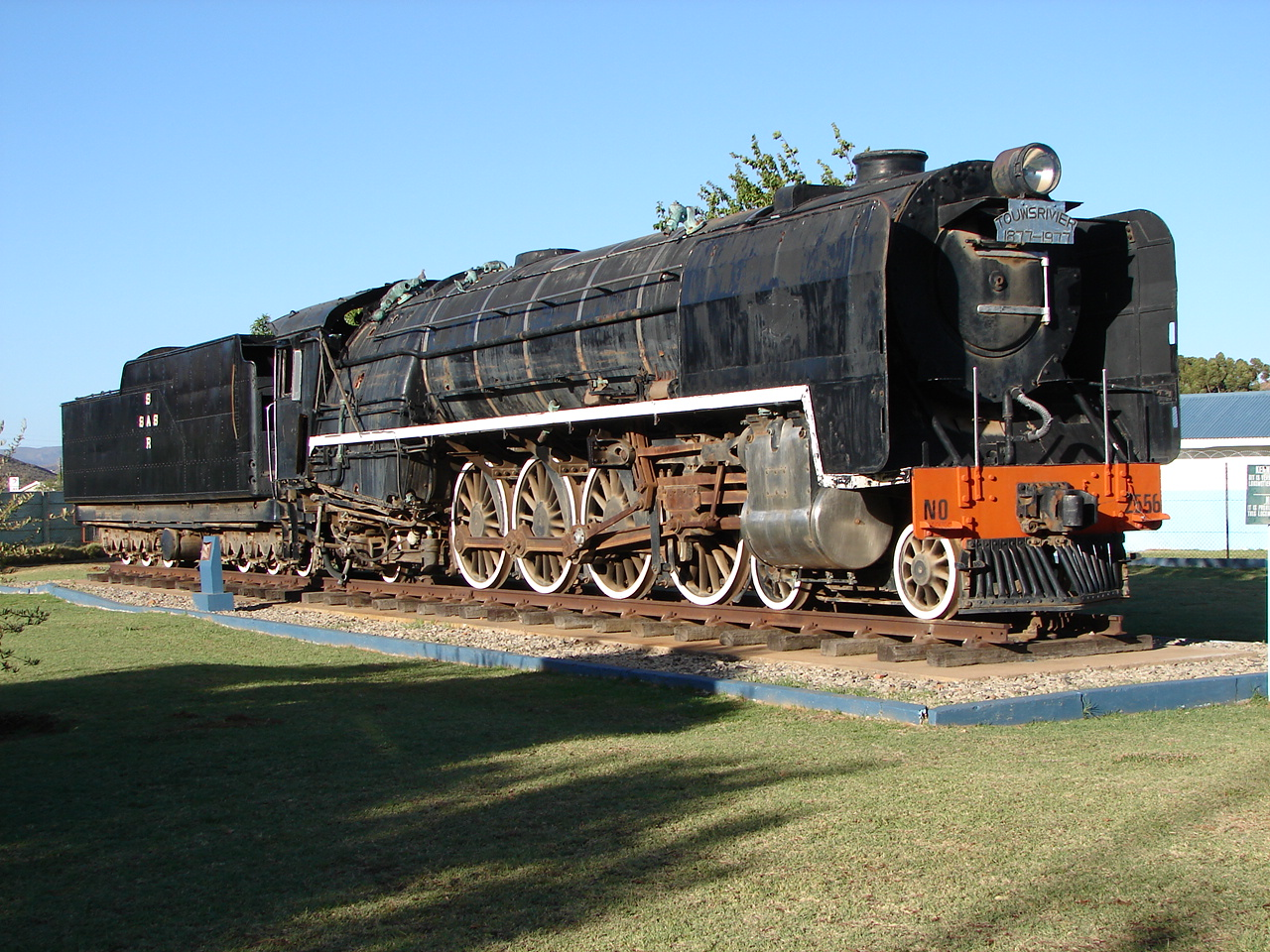
- No. 2556 in Gideon Joubert park, Touws River, 8 January 2010
Type and origin
- ♠ Locomotive numbers 2552-2271 ♥ Locomotive numbers 3201-3316
- Power type: Steam
- Designer: South African Railways (W.A.J. Day)
- Builder: Berliner Maschinenbau; Henschel and Son
- Serial number: Berliner 10738-10744, 10816, 10985-10999, 11001-11015; Henschel 23742-23754, 24155-24239
- Model: Class 23
- Build date: 1938
- Total produced: 136
Specifications
- Configuration
  - Whyte: 4-8-2 (Mountain)
  - UIC: 2'D1'h2
- Driver: 2nd coupled axle
- Gauge: 3 ft 6 in (1,067 mm) Cape gauge
- Leading dia.: 34 in (864 mm)
- Coupled dia.: 63 in (1,600 mm)
- Trailing dia.: 34 in (864 mm)
- Tender wheels: 34 in (864 mm)
- Minimum curve: 300 ft (91 m)
- Wheelbase: ♠ 77 ft 8 1/2 in (23,686 mm) ♥ 78 ft 2 1/2 in (23,838 mm)
  - Engine: 37 ft 1/2 in (11,290 mm)
  - Leading: 7 ft 2 in (2,184 mm)
  - Coupled: 16 ft 6 in (5,029 mm)
  - Tender: 30 ft 8 in (9,347 mm)
  - Tender bogie: 8 ft 8 in (2,642 mm)
- Length
  - Over couplers: 87 ft 2 1/4 in (26,575 mm)
- Height: 12 ft 11 1/2 in (3,950 mm)
- Frame type: Bar
- Axle load: ♠ 18 LT 17 cwt (19,150 kg) ♥ 18 LT 14 cwt (19,000 kg)
  - Leading: ♠ 20 LT 7 cwt (20,680 kg) ♥ 20 LT 17 cwt (21,180 kg)
  - 1st coupled: ♠ 17 LT 16 cwt (18,090 kg) ♥ 17 LT 12 cwt (17,880 kg)
  - 2nd coupled: ♠ 18 LT 17 cwt (19,150 kg) ♥ 18 LT 14 cwt (19,000 kg)
  - 3rd coupled: ♠ 18 LT 15 cwt (19,050 kg) ♥ 18 LT 13 cwt (18,950 kg)
  - 4th coupled: ♠ 17 LT 16 cwt (18,090 kg) ♥ 17 LT 11 cwt (17,830 kg)
  - Trailing: ♠ 17 LT 8 cwt (17,680 kg) ♥ 17 LT 15 cwt (18,030 kg)
  - Tender bogie: Bogie 1: ♠ 54 LT 14 cwt (55,580 kg) ♥ 53 LT 17 cwt (54,710 kg); Bogie 2: ♠ 54 LT (54,870 kg) ♥ 53 LT 17 cwt (54,710 kg)
  - Tender axle: ♠ 18 LT (18,290 kg) ♥ 17 LT 19 cwt (18,240 kg)
- Adhesive weight: ♠ 73 LT 4 cwt (74,370 kg) ♥ 72 LT 10 cwt (73,660 kg)
- Loco weight: ♠ 110 LT 19 cwt (112,700 kg) ♥ 111 LT 2 cwt (112,900 kg)
- Tender weight: ♠ 104 LT 5 cwt (105,900 kg) ♥ 107 LT 14 cwt (109,400 kg)
- Total weight: ♠ 215 LT 4 cwt (218,700 kg) ♥ 218 LT 16 cwt (222,300 kg)
- Tender type: EW (3-axle bogies)
- Fuel type: Coal
- Fuel capacity: 18 LT (18.3 t)
- Water cap.: ♠ 9,200 imp gal (41,800 L) ♥ 9,500 imp gal (43,200 L)
- Firebox
  - Type: Round-top
  - Grate area: 63 sq ft (5.9 m^{2})
- Boiler
  - Model: Watson Standard no. 3B
  - Type: Domeless
  - Pitch: 9 ft (2,743 mm)
  - Diameter: 6 ft 2 1/4 in (1,886 mm)
  - Tube plates: 22 ft 6 in (6,858 mm)
  - Small tubes: 136: 2 1/2 in (64 mm)
  - Large tubes: 36: 5 1/2 in (140 mm)
- Boiler pressure: 225 psi (1,551 kPa)
- Safety valve: Ross-pop
- Heating surface
  - Firebox: 206 sq ft (19.1 m^{2})
  - Tubes: 3,168 sq ft (294.3 m^{2})
  - Arch tubes: 26 sq ft (2.4 m^{2})
  - Total surface: 3,400 sq ft (320 m^{2})
- Superheater
  - Heating area: 676 sq ft (62.8 m^{2})
- Cylinders: Two
- Cylinder size: 24 in (610 mm) bore 28 in (711 mm) stroke
- Valve gear: Walschaerts
- Valve type: Piston
- Valve travel: 7 1/2 in (191 mm)
- Couplers: AAR knuckle
Performance figures
- Tractive effort: 43,200 lbf (192 kN) @ 75%
Career
- Operators: South African Railways
- Class: Class 23
- Number in class: 136
- Numbers: 2552-2571, 3201-3316
- Delivered: 1938-1939
- First run: 1938
- Withdrawn: 1983

The South African Railways Class 23 4-8-2 was a class of South African steam locomotives.

In 1938 and 1939, the South African Railways placed 136 Class 23 steam locomotives in service. The Class 23 was the last and the largest 4-8-2 Mountain type locomotive to be designed by the South African Railways.

== Manufacturers ==
The Class 23 4-8-2 Mountain type steam locomotive was designed by W.A.J. Day, Chief Mechanical Engineer (CME) of the South African Railways (SAR) from 1936 to 1939. It was intended as a general utility locomotive, capable of operating on 80 pounds per yard (40 kilograms per metre) rail, and was built in two batches by Berliner Maschinenbau and Henschel and Son in Germany. The original order in 1938 was for twenty locomotives, of which Berliner built seven, numbered in the range from 2552 to 2558, and Henschel thirteen, numbered in the range from 2559 to 2571.

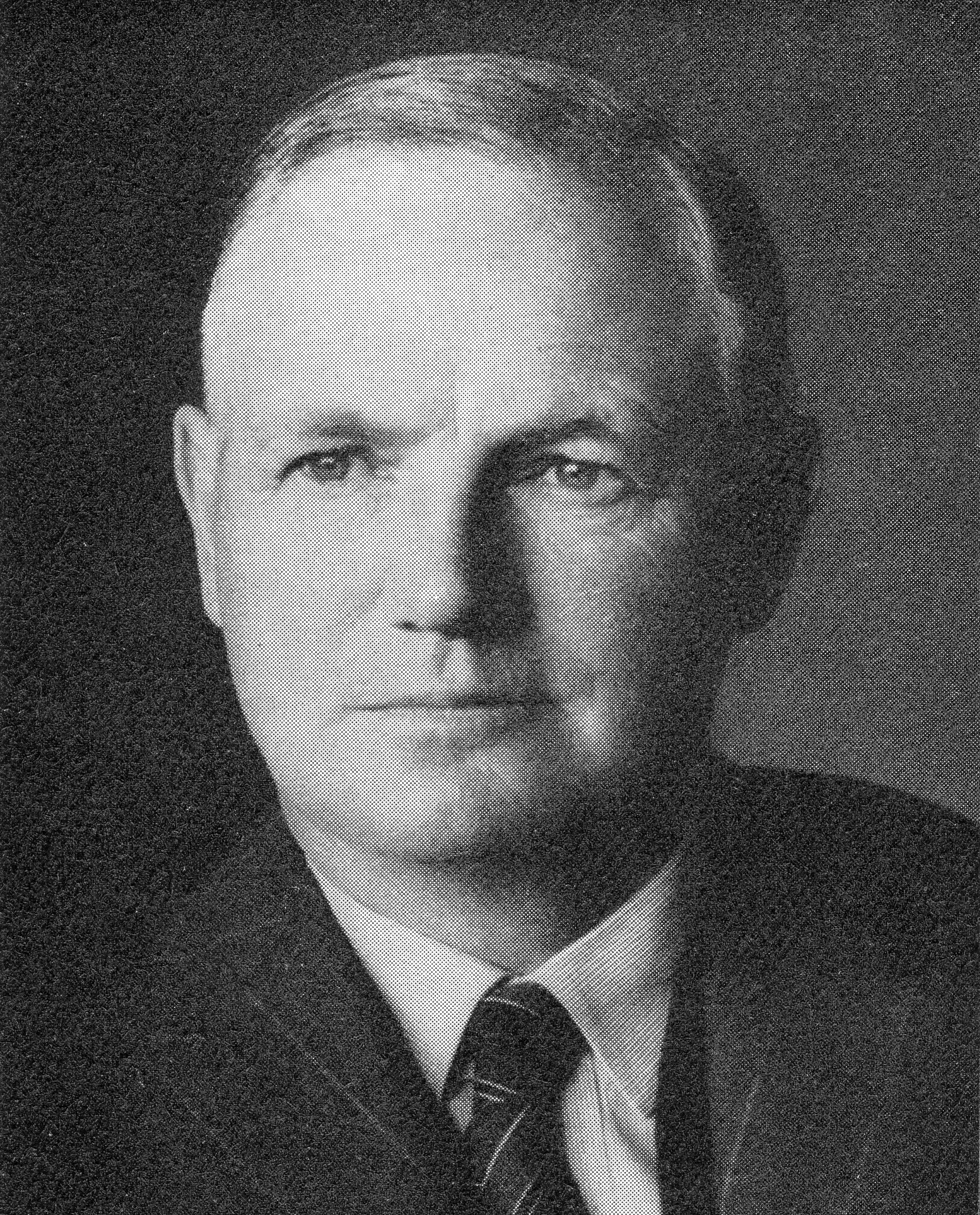
W.A.J. Day

At the time, the urgency brought about by the rapidly deteriorating political climate in Europe led to a further 116 locomotives being ordered even before the first batch could be delivered and tested, contrary to usual SAR practice. Ordering this quantity of a new class of engine before any had been tried out constituted a record for the SAR. Of this second batch, Henschel built 85, numbered in the range from 3201 to 3285, and Berliner 31, numbered in the range from 3286 to 3316. The last locomotive of this second order was delivered in August 1939, just one month before the outbreak of the Second World War.

Berliner-built locomotive no. 3301 received an out-of-sequence works number, Berliner no. 10816 instead of no. 11000, since works number 11000 was reserved for the new Class 01.10 4-6-2 Pacific type locomotive for the German State Railways.

== Characteristics ==
In general appearance and power, the Class 23 locomotive is very similar to the Classes 15E and 15F. As originally designed, the locomotive would have had 66 inches (1,676 millimetres) coupled wheels which would have required a newly designed boiler to accommodate the extra length brought about by the long coupled wheelbase. The increasing political turmoil in Europe and the resulting urgency, however, prohibited time being spent on designing a new boiler. As a result, the existing Watson Standard no. 3B boiler was incorporated in the design with an extra long smokebox which was extended by 1 foot 6 inches (457 millimetres) to partially compensate for the shorter boiler. This boiler was one of the range of standard type boilers which was designed by Day's predecessor as CME, A.G. Watson, as part of the latter's standardisation policy. To maintain approximately the same tractive effort as the Class 15E, the boiler pressure was raised to 225 pounds per square inch (1,551 kilopascals), at the time the highest yet used on the SAR since the SAR loading gauge did not permit horizontal cylinders of greater bore diameter than 24 inches (610 millimetres) with normal cylinder spacing.

The locomotives were delivered without smoke deflectors, but after the war they were fitted with standard elephant ear smoke deflectors based upon the Deutsche Reichsbahn design.

The inner firebox was of steel and was fitted with five 3 inches (76 millimetres) diameter arch tubes, which supported the brick arch. The rocking grate, with two drop-grates, was actuated by a steam shaker. As was the practice with Watson Standard boilers, the hopper type ashpan was secured to the main frames instead of to the boiler foundation ring, with a 4 inches (102 millimetres) air gap all round. Drench pipes were fitted to facilitate cleaning and the bottom of the ashpan was fitted with a hand-operated sliding door.

To enable them to negotiate 300 feet (91 metres) radius curves, the leading coupled wheels were given a 1 inch (25 millimetres) total side-play in their horn blocks, while the tyre flanges of the intermediate coupled wheels were of reduced thickness and the leading coupling rods were provided with spherical bearings at the knuckle joints and crank pins. In addition, largely also as a result of the decision to use the shorter Watson Standard boiler, it was decided to reduce the coupled wheel diameter from the originally intended 66 inches (1,676 millimetres) to 63 inches (1,600 millimetres), which shortened the coupled wheelbase and would further ease passage on sharp curves.

== Tender ==
Since these locomotives were intended for working in the Karoo where good quality water is a scarce resource, they were equipped with very large Type EW tenders which rode on six-wheeled bogies to enable longer runs to be undertaken between watering stops or to skip bad watering places. They were the largest tenders to have been used in South Africa up to that time and as originally designed, would have had a water capacity of 10,000 imperial gallons (45,500 litres) and a coal capacity of 18 long tons (18.3 tonnes). Owing to axle load restrictions, however, it was necessary to reduce the water capacity to 9,200 imperial gallons (41,800 litres). The first batch of twenty locomotives were delivered with such tenders.

The second batch of 116 locomotives were delivered with a modification to the tender's underframe. To improve the weight distribution, both tender pivot centres were relocated 6 inches (152 millimetres) towards the rear. This enabled the water capacity to be increased to 9,500 imperial gallons (43,200 litres) on these 116 tenders. While the locomotive-and-tender's length over couplers was not affected, the total wheelbase of the second batch was 6 inches (152 millimetres) longer since the distance between the engine's trailing wheel and the first tender wheel was increased from 10 feet (3,048 millimetres) to 10 feet 6 inches (3,200 millimetres).

Four vacuum cylinders operated clasp brakes on all tender wheels and a hand brake was included. Since experience showed that a firegrate of 63 square feet (5.9 square metres) cannot be served effectively under all conditions by manual stoking, particularly on long runs, a type H.T-1 mechanical stoker was fitted, supplied by the Standard Stoker Company of America. The mechanical stoker engine was mounted on the tender.

== Streamlining ==
During the 1930s, the streamlining of locomotives was fashionable in Europe and the United States of America. It was proposed to adopt streamlining on some of the Class 23 locomotives which were intended for the Cape mainline and the manufacturers were requested to submit estimates to that effect. Since streamlining would increase the cost by £500 per locomotive and increase the weight by approximately 2 long tons (2.0 tonnes), the idea was abandoned, especially in light of the negligible performance benefit of streamlining at the official maximum 55 miles per hour (89 kilometres per hour) goods train speeds on Cape gauge and the reduced accessibility of working parts on a streamlined locomotive.

== Locomotive naming ==
Although the naming of locomotives in South Africa dates back to the Cape Town Railway and Dock Company's 0-4-2 locomotives of 20 March 1860 and the Natal Railway's 0-4-0WT Natal of 13 May 1860, it was rarely done. In 1945, the Minister of Transport at the time, the Honourable F. C. Sturrock MP, instructed that a number of Classes 15F and 23 engines should be named after various South African cities and towns and fitted with suitable nameplates in both official languages. The decorative plates were fitted to the sides of the smokebox or to the elephant ear smoke deflectors of engines which were so equipped. Thirteen Class 23 locomotives were named.

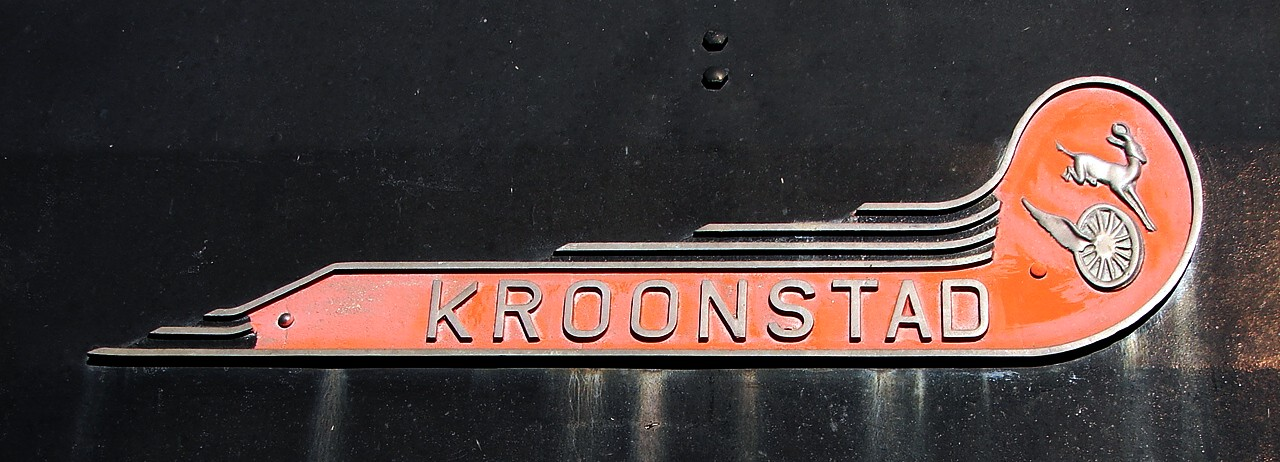
Kroonstad nameplate on Class 23 no. 3300, off Class 15F no. 3044

- No. 3273 - City of Cape Town
- No. 3277 - City of Pietermaritzburg
- No. 3278 - Newcastle
- No. 3279 - Worcester
- No. 3280 - Oudtshoorn
- No. 3289 - City of East London
- No. 3303 - City of Grahamstown
- No. 3311 - City of Kimberley
- No. 3312 - Upington
- No. 3313 - City of Port Elizabeth
- No. 3314 - Uitenhage
- No. 3315 - City of Durban
- No. 3316 - Ladysmith

In later years, some of these names migrated to other engines and classes, several eventually ending up on Class 25NC locomotives. Other names were also added later and, for example, by 1969 no. 3229 bore the name Springs.

== Service ==
The new class soon formed the bulk of the motive power on the lines from Touws River to Beaufort West and from De Aar to Welverdiend via Kimberley and Klerksdorp.

When new, a few Class 23s were briefly allocated to Braamfontein to haul the Union Limited and other Cape express passenger trains from Johannesburg, and the Class 16DA and Class 16E were transferred to Bloemfontein. Since the electric turntable at Braamfontein could not accommodate the locomotive and its long Type EW tender, engines coming in from Klerksdorp had to detach at Johannesburg station and run light to India Junction near Germiston to be turned on the triangular junction. The Braamfontein Class 23s were therefore soon transferred to the Cape Northern System and Braamfontein was provided with Class 15Fs that could fit onto its turntable.

Upon the arrival of the new Classes 25 and 25NC in 1953, the Class 23 was transferred to Bloemfontein to work south from there to Noupoort and Burgersdorp. Occasionally they worked north to Kroonstad and west across to Kimberley, but the Class 15F generally did most of that work.

When ore traffic from Postmasburg to Durban began to increase in the late 1950s, caboose-working was instituted c. 1959. Block loads of manganese ore were worked by steam over the route from Postmasburg via Kimberley and Bloemfontein to Kroonstad and four block loads were dispatched from Postmasburg to Maydon Wharf in Durban every 24 hours, seven days per week. Four crews on a pair of Class 23 locomotives with a caboose attached for crew accommodation worked in 21-day cycles out of Bloemfontein. The crews were supposed to work eight hours on and eight hours off, but by agreement they usually worked twelve-hour shifts instead.

Each caboose-working cycle began with the picking up of a string of 34 empty hopper wagons and a guard's van in Bloemfontein. These were worked through to Postmasburg, with the engines recoaling at Kamfersdam outside Kimberley. At Postmasburg they picked up 34 loaded hopper wagons and a guard's van, an approximate load of 2,700 tons, and worked all the way through to Kroonstad, where the loads were re-marshalled into 1,500 ton bites for the 1 in 66 (1½%) grades east of there to Harrismith. At Kroonstad the loaded hoppers were exchanged for empties and the whole cycle repeated. Recoaling points were at Postmasburg, Kamfersdam, Hamilton and Kroonstad and en route rewatering points were at Kloofeind and Glen. It took roughly two days to complete a loaded-empty cycle over the full route and an average of ten cycles were managed on each three-week tour of duty. Caboose-working was always with pairs of Class 23 locomotives, until the Class 25 condensers took over the section from Postmasburg to Kamfers Dam c. 1962 and the practice was discontinued. After electrification of the Postmasburg branch late in 1966, steam only came on at Beaconsfield and crews and engines were once more being changed in the traditional manner at Bloemfontein, Kroonstad and Bethlehem.

Due to metal fatigue cracks which developed in their 5 inches (127 millimetres) thick rolled steel bar frames, the Class 23 was withdrawn from mainline service considerably earlier than the similar and contemporary Class 15F. They were all retired by 1983, many of them in the process donating their large Type EW tenders to increase the range of the Class 15F. At least one of these tenders, that of no. 3209, was later rebuilt to a water-only tender.

== Works numbers ==
The table shows the Class 23 engine numbers, builders and works numbers. On the builders' works lists, all the locomotives are recorded as having been built in 1938.

Class 23 4-8-2 Builders and Works Numbers
SAR No.	Builder	Works No.
2552	Berliner	10738
2553	Berliner	10739
2554	Berliner	10740
2555	Berliner	10741
2556	Berliner	10742
2557	Berliner	10743
2558	Berliner	10744
2559	Henschel	23742
2560	Henschel	23743
2561	Henschel	23744
2562	Henschel	23745
2563	Henschel	23746
2564	Henschel	23747
2565	Henschel	23748
2566	Henschel	23749
2567	Henschel	23750
2568	Henschel	23751
2569	Henschel	23752
2570	Henschel	23753
2571	Henschel	23754
3201	Henschel	24155
3202	Henschel	24156
3203	Henschel	24157
3204	Henschel	24158
3205	Henschel	24159
3206	Henschel	24160
3207	Henschel	24161
3208	Henschel	24162
3209	Henschel	24163
3210	Henschel	24164
3211	Henschel	24165
3212	Henschel	24166
3213	Henschel	24167
3214	Henschel	24168
3215	Henschel	24169
3216	Henschel	24170
3217	Henschel	24171
3218	Henschel	24172
3219	Henschel	24173
3220	Henschel	24174
3221	Henschel	24175
3222	Henschel	24176
3223	Henschel	24177
3224	Henschel	24178
3225	Henschel	24179
3226	Henschel	24180
3227	Henschel	24181
3228	Henschel	24182
3229	Henschel	24183
3230	Henschel	24184
3231	Henschel	24185
3232	Henschel	24186
3233	Henschel	24187
3234	Henschel	24188
3235	Henschel	24189
3236	Henschel	24190
3237	Henschel	24191
3238	Henschel	24192
3239	Henschel	24193
3240	Henschel	24194
3241	Henschel	24195
3242	Henschel	24196
3243	Henschel	24197
3244	Henschel	24198
3245	Henschel	24199
3246	Henschel	24200
3247	Henschel	24201
3248	Henschel	24202
3249	Henschel	24203
3250	Henschel	24204
3251	Henschel	24205
3252	Henschel	24206
3253	Henschel	24207
3254	Henschel	24208
3255	Henschel	24209
3256	Henschel	24210
3257	Henschel	24211
3258	Henschel	24212
3259	Henschel	24213
3260	Henschel	24214
3261	Henschel	24215
3262	Henschel	24216
3263	Henschel	24217
3264	Henschel	24218
3265	Henschel	24219
3266	Henschel	24220
3267	Henschel	24221
3268	Henschel	24222
3269	Henschel	24223
3270	Henschel	24224
3271	Henschel	24225
3272	Henschel	24226
3273	Henschel	24227
3274	Henschel	24228
3275	Henschel	24229
3276	Henschel	24230
3277	Henschel	24231
3278	Henschel	24232
3279	Henschel	24233
3280	Henschel	24234
3281	Henschel	24235
3282	Henschel	24236
3283	Henschel	24237
3284	Henschel	24238
3285	Henschel	24239
3286	Berliner	10985
3287	Berliner	10986
3288	Berliner	10987
3289	Berliner	10988
3290	Berliner	10989
3291	Berliner	10990
3292	Berliner	10991
3293	Berliner	10992
3294	Berliner	10993
3295	Berliner	10994
3296	Berliner	10995
3297	Berliner	10996
3298	Berliner	10997
3299	Berliner	10998
3300	Berliner	10999
3301	Berliner	10816
3302	Berliner	11001
3303	Berliner	11002
3304	Berliner	11003
3305	Berliner	11004
3306	Berliner	11005
3307	Berliner	11006
3308	Berliner	11007
3309	Berliner	11008
3310	Berliner	11009
3311	Berliner	11010
3312	Berliner	11011
3313	Berliner	11012
3314	Berliner	11013
3315	Berliner	11014
3316	Berliner	11015

== Preservation ==
Two of these locomotives still exist:

Number	Works nmr	THF / Private	Leaselend / Owner	Current Location	Outside SOUTH AFRICA	?
2556	Berliner 10742	Private	Towsrivier Municipality			
3300	Berliner 10999	THF	Transnet Heritage Foundation	Bloemfontein Locomotive Depot		

== Illustration ==
The main picture shows Berliner-built no. 2556 which was plinthed next to the High School in Gideon Joubert Park in Touws River on occasion of that Railway town's centenary in 1977. It was officially presented to the town on 24 September 1977 by SAR chief executive Dr. Kobus Loubser.

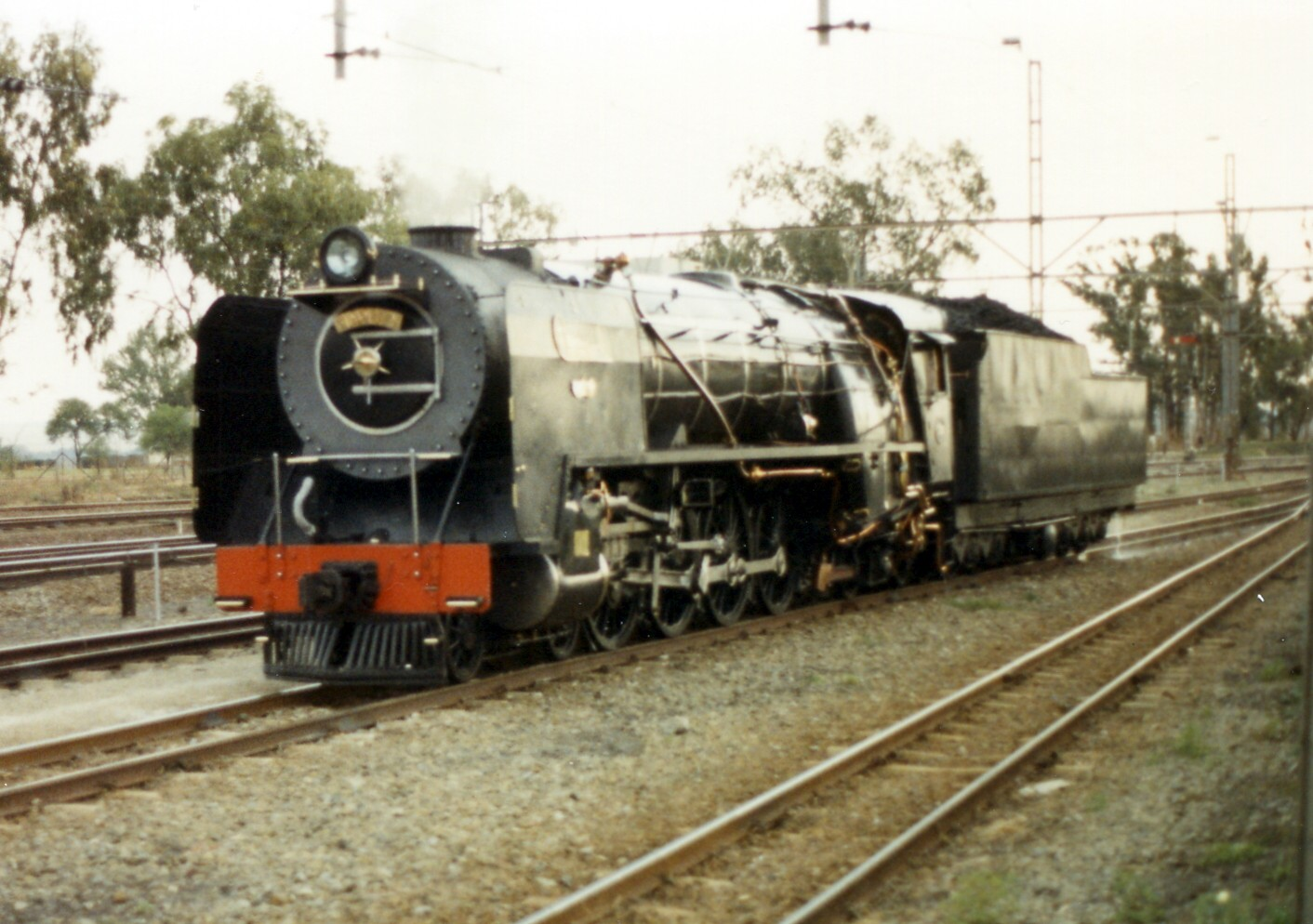
Berliner-built no. 3300 at Koppies between Sasolburg and Kroonstad, 6 October 1989

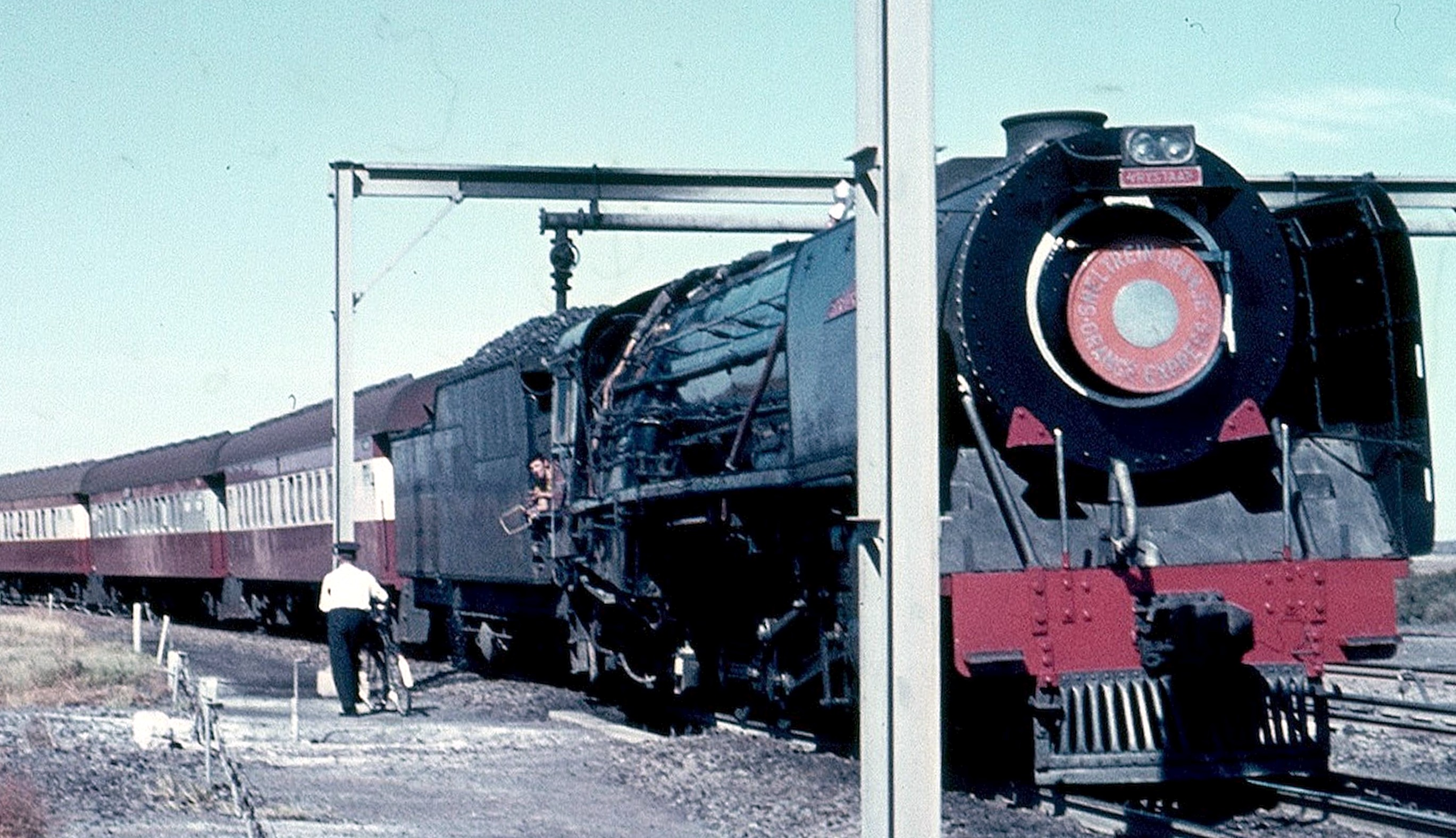
Henschel-built no. 3282 Vrystaat on the Orange Express, stopped at Perdeberg on the line between Petrusburg and Kimberley
