= South African Class 19 4-8-2 =

1928 design of steam locomotive

South African Class 19 & 19R 4-8-2
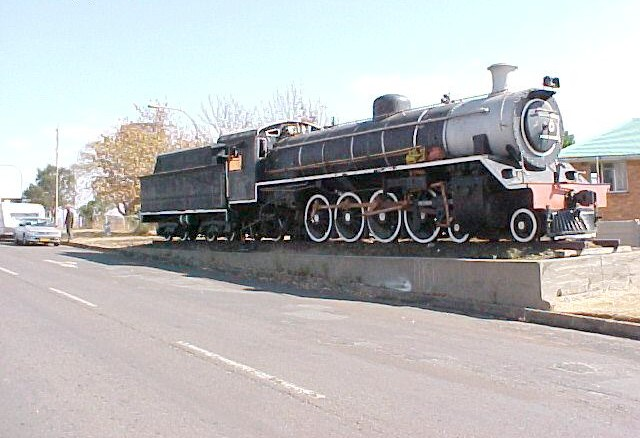
- No. 1369 plinthed in Breyten, 11 June 2005
Type and origin
- ♠ Class 19 as built with a round-topped firebox ♥ Class 19R rebuilt with a Watson Standard boiler
- Power type: Steam
- Designer: South African Railways (Col F.R. Collins DSO)
- Builder: Berliner Maschinenbau
- Serial number: 9279–9282
- Model: Class 19
- Build date: 1928
- Total produced: 4
Specifications
- Configuration
  - Whyte: 4-8-2 (Mountain)
  - UIC: 2'D1'h2
- Driver: 2nd coupled axle
- Gauge: 3 ft 6 in (1,067 mm) Cape gauge
- Leading dia.: 28 1/2 in (724 mm)
- Coupled dia.: 54 in (1,372 mm)
- Trailing dia.: 33 in (838 mm)
- Tender wheels: 34 in (864 mm)
- Wheelbase: 58 ft 7 3/4 in (17,875 mm)
  - Axle spacing (Asymmetrical): 1-2: 4 ft 10 in (1,473 mm); 2-3: 4 ft 9 in (1,448 mm); 3-4: 4 ft 10 in (1,473 mm)
  - Engine: 32 ft 2 in (9,804 mm)
  - Leading: 6 ft 2 in (1,880 mm)
  - Coupled: 14 ft 5 in (4,394 mm)
  - Tender: 16 ft 9 in (5,105 mm)
  - Tender bogie: 4 ft 7 in (1,397 mm)
- Length
  - Over couplers: 67 ft 6 1/2 in (20,587 mm)
- Height: ♠ 12 ft 10 in (3,912 mm) ♥ 12 ft 10 7/8 in (3,934 mm)
- Frame type: Bar
- Axle load: ♠ 13 LT 9 cwt (13,670 kg) ♥ 12 LT 19 cwt (13,160 kg)
  - Leading: ♠ 14 LT 7 cwt (14,580 kg) ♥ 13 LT 18 cwt (14,120 kg)
  - 1st coupled: ♠ 13 LT 3 cwt (13,360 kg) ♥ 12 LT 15 cwt (12,950 kg)
  - 2nd coupled: ♠ 13 LT 1 cwt (13,260 kg) ♥ 12 LT 12 cwt (12,800 kg)
  - 3rd coupled: ♠ 13 LT 9 cwt (13,670 kg) ♥ 12 LT 19 cwt (13,160 kg)
  - 4th coupled: ♠ 13 LT 8 cwt (13,620 kg) ♥ 12 LT 16 cwt (13,010 kg)
  - Trailing: ♠ 12 LT 1 cwt (12,240 kg) ♥ 10 LT 18 cwt (11,070 kg)
  - Tender bogie: Bogie 1: 28 LT 16 cwt (29,260 kg); Bogie 2: 29 LT 8 cwt (29,870 kg)
  - Tender axle: 14 LT 14 cwt (14,940 kg)
- Adhesive weight: ♠ 53 LT 1 cwt (53,900 kg) ♥ 51 LT 2 cwt (51,920 kg)
- Loco weight: ♠ 79 LT 9 cwt (80,720 kg) ♥ 75 LT 18 cwt (77,120 kg)
- Tender weight: 58 LT 4 cwt (59,130 kg)
- Total weight: ♠ 137 LT 13 cwt (139,900 kg) ♥ 134 LT 2 cwt (136,300 kg)
- Tender type: MS (2-axle bogies); MP, MP1, MR, MS, MX, MY, MY1 permitted
- Fuel type: Coal
- Fuel capacity: 11 LT (11.2 t)
- Water cap.: 5,000 imp gal (22,700 L)
- Firebox
  - Type: Round-top
  - Grate area: ♠ 37 sq ft (3.4 m^{2}) ♥ 36 sq ft (3.3 m^{2})
- Boiler
  - Model: Watson Standard no. 1A
  - Pitch: 8 ft (2,438 mm)
  - Diameter: 5 ft (1,524 mm)
  - Tube plates: 20 ft 2 in (6,147 mm)
  - Small tubes: ♠ 120: 2 1/4 in (57 mm) ♥ 76: 2 1/2 in (64 mm)
  - Large tubes: ♠ 21: 5 1/2 in (140 mm) ♥ 24: 5 1/2 in (140 mm)
- Boiler pressure: 200 psi (1,379 kPa)
- Safety valve: Pop
- Heating surface
  - Firebox: ♠ 127 sq ft (11.8 m^{2}) ♥ 123 sq ft (11.4 m^{2})
  - Tubes: ♠ 2,036 sq ft (189.2 m^{2}) ♥ 1,700 sq ft (160 m^{2})
  - Arch tubes: ♠ 13 sq ft (1.2 m^{2}) ♥ 16 sq ft (1.5 m^{2})
  - Total surface: ♠ 2,176 sq ft (202.2 m^{2}) ♥ 1,839 sq ft (170.8 m^{2})
- Superheater
  - Heating area: ♠ 506 sq ft (47.009 m^{2}) ♥ 404 sq ft (37.533 m^{2})
- Cylinders: Two
- Cylinder size: 21 in (533 mm) bore 26 in (660 mm) stroke
- Valve gear: Heusinger
- Valve type: Piston
- Couplers: AAR knuckle
Performance figures
- Tractive effort: ♠♥ 31,850 lbf (141.7 kN) @ 75%
Career
- Operators: South African Railways
- Class: Class 19, 19R
- Number in class: 4
- Numbers: 1366–1369
- Delivered: 1928
- First run: 1928
- Withdrawn: 1977

The South African Railways Class 19 4-8-2 of 1928 was a steam locomotive.

In 1928, the South African Railways placed four Class 19 steam locomotives with a 4-8-2 Mountain type wheel arrangement in service. They were the forerunners of a family of light-rail branch line engines which would remain in service until the very end of the steam era. One of them was later reboilered with a Watson Standard boiler and reclassified to Class 19R.

== Manufacturer ==
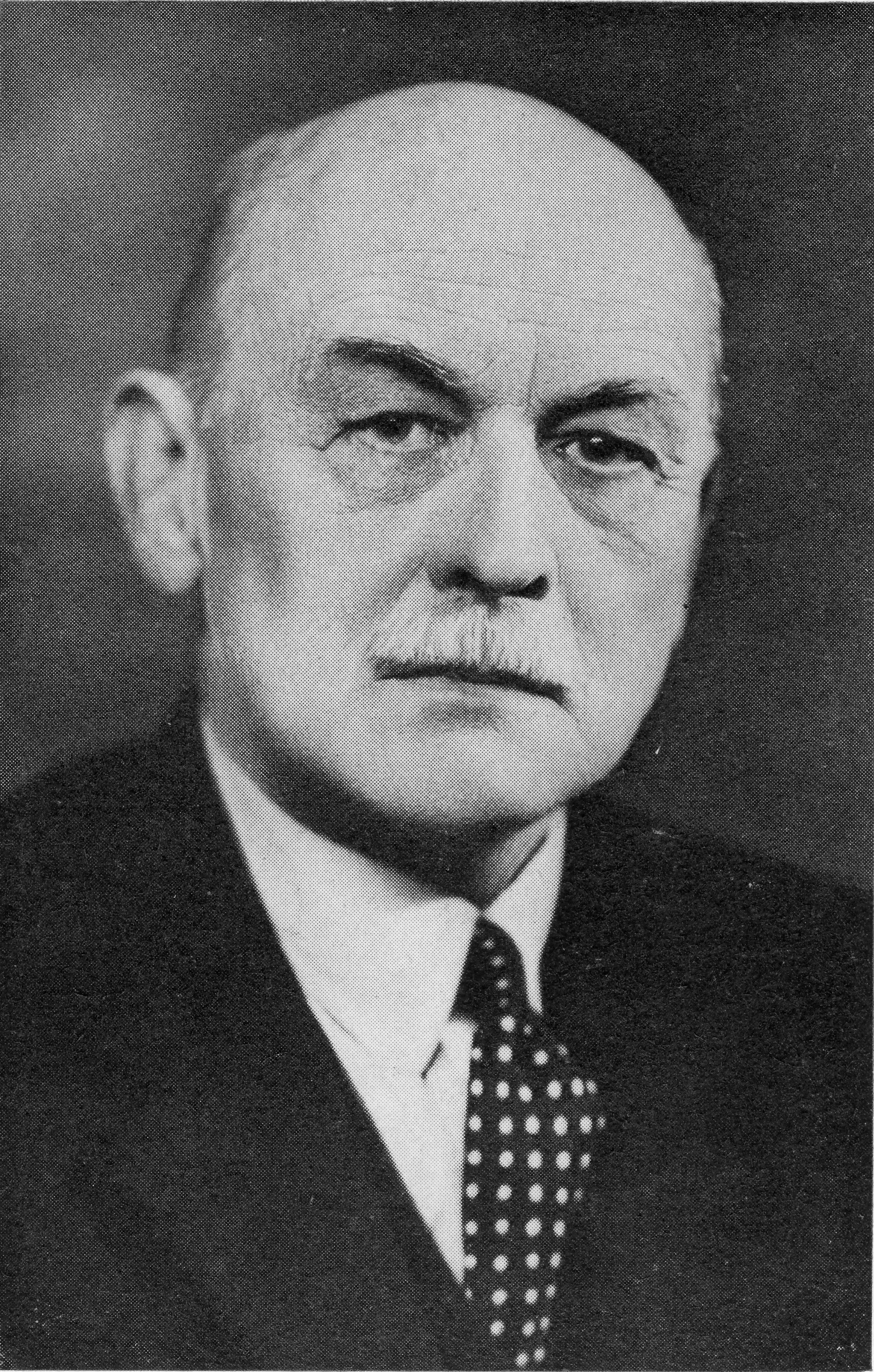
Col F.R. Collins DSO

Until 1928, the bulk of light 60 pounds per yard (30 kilograms per metre) branch line traffic on the South African Railways (SAR) was hauled by Classes 6, 7 and 8 locomotives. Due to the increase in traffic during the late 1920s, the need arose for a new and heavier type of branch line locomotive.

At the request and under the direction of Colonel F.R. Collins DSO, Chief Mechanical Engineer (CME) of the SAR from 1922 to 1929, the basic design of the new Class 19 4-8-2 steam locomotive was done by Research and Test Engineer M.M. Loubser, himself later to be appointed as CME from 1939 to 1949. In 1928, four locomotives were built in Germany by Berliner Maschinenbau AG (BMAG), the former L. Schwartzkopff. They were delivered and placed in service during that same year.

== Characteristics ==
The locomotives, numbered in the range from 1366 to 1369, were in essence a lighter branch line development of the earlier Classes 15CB and 15CA heavy 4-8-2 mainline locomotives and proved to be extremely successful. They were approximately 50% more powerful than the Class 8 family and also had better speed with their larger diameter coupled wheels. They were superheated, built on bar frames and their piston valves were actuated by Walschaerts valve gear.

A feature which was to be followed for all subsequent SAR locomotives was their relatively large firegrate area of 37 square feet (3.4 square metres). The round-topped firebox had flexible stays fitted in the breaking zones. Three support brackets tied the boiler barrel to the main bar frames. As far as practicable, mountings were fixed to a steam stand on the firebox top and fitted with extensions to the spindles to carry the handles inside the cab, within easy reach of the enginemen.

The cylinders drove on the second pair of coupled wheels. The locomotives were fitted with the single slide-bar type piston crossheads, popular in Europe but prone to rapid wear under South African conditions. The valve spindle crossheads were screwed to the ends of the valve spindles and secured with locknuts. Although this made adjustment easier, it was not satisfactory in service and was later replaced by the usual taper fit with cotter pin. With these two exceptions, the mechanical parts of the Class 19 gave very little trouble.

As built, the Class 19 was delivered with Type MS tenders with an 11 long tons (11.2 tonnes) coal and a 5,000 imperial gallons (22,700 litres) water capacity and an axle load of 14 long tons 14 hundredweight (14,940 kilograms).

== Successors ==
Following the pilot project with only four Class 19 locomotives, four variants on the class were acquired over the next twenty-one years.

- The slightly smaller Class 19A in 1929.
- The Class 19B in 1930.
- The Class 19C in 1935.
- The Class 19D between 1936 and 1949.

The Class 19 family earned a reputation for reliability, easy handling, long periods between overhauls and economical operation. While preparing the specifications, Loubser gave considerable thought to the layout of this locomotive and the Research and Test Department was consulted on the most suitable wheel arrangement and other design details. The result more than justified the amount of care and thought taken during the design process.

== Watson Standard boilers ==
From the 1930s, many serving locomotives were reboilered with a standard boiler type designed by then CME A.G. Watson as part of his standardisation policy. Such Watson Standard reboilered locomotives were reclassified by adding an "R" suffix to their classification.

In 1966, when Class 19 no. 1367 was reboilered with a Watson Standard no. 1A boiler, it became the sole Class 19R. The Watson Standard no. 1A boiler was designed to the same basic dimensions as the Class 19 boiler, but with more superheater elements, a different tube arrangement and larger diameter small tubes. In the process of reboilering, no. 1367 was also equipped with a Watson cab with its distinctive inclined front compared to the conventional vertical front of the original cab.

While an obvious visual difference between an original and a Watson Standard reboilered locomotive is usually a rectangular regulator cover just to the rear of the chimney on the reboilered locomotive, the slanted front of the new cab on no. 1367 served as an even more obvious identifying feature.

== Service ==
The four Class 19 locomotives were placed in service on the line between Kimberley and Vryburg, but they eventually spent their later working years at Empangeni and on the Bergville branch in Natal. In the 1950s, they were used especially on passenger trains between Machadodorp via Breyten to Vryheid. Some later exchanged their Type MS tenders for lighter modified Type MP1 tenders. By 1977, they were all withdrawn from service. No. 1369, with a Type MP1 tender, was plinthed in Breyten in Mpumalanga. One engine, the reboilered Class 19R no. 1367, was sold into industrial service in Natal and became the Platberg Colliery no. 2.

== Preservation ==
Number	Works nmr	THF / Private	Leaselend / Owner	Current Location	Outside South Africa	?
1366	BERLINER 9279	THF		Krugersdorp Locomotive Depot		
1369	BERLINER 9282	Private	Municipality	Breyton (Main Street)		

== Illustration ==
The last picture below shows the reboilered Class 19R no. 1367. Note the regulator cover to the rear of the chimney and the inclined front of the cab.

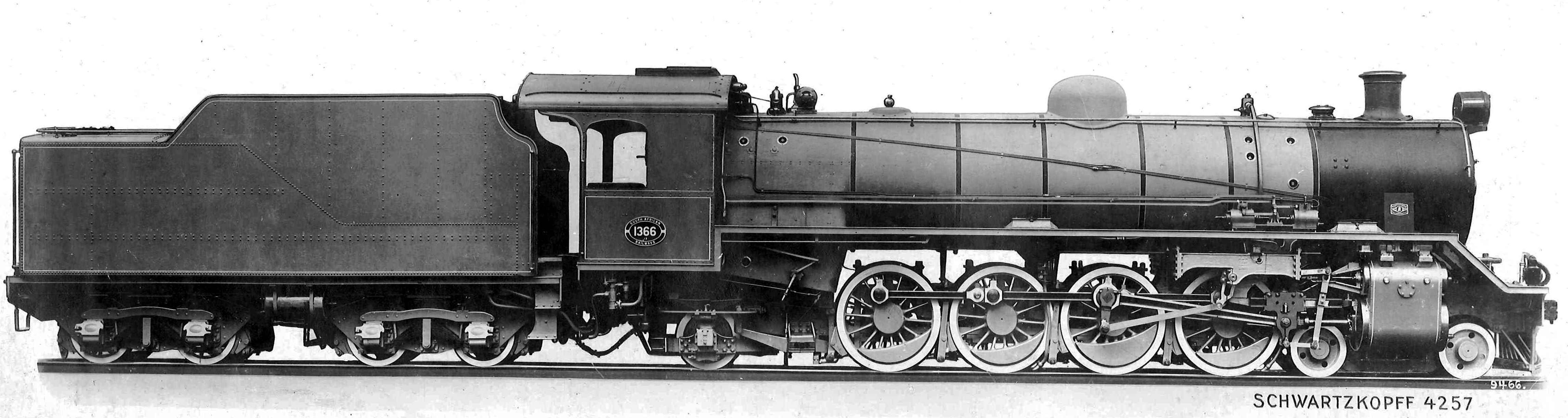
No. 1366, as delivered with Type MS tender, c. 1928

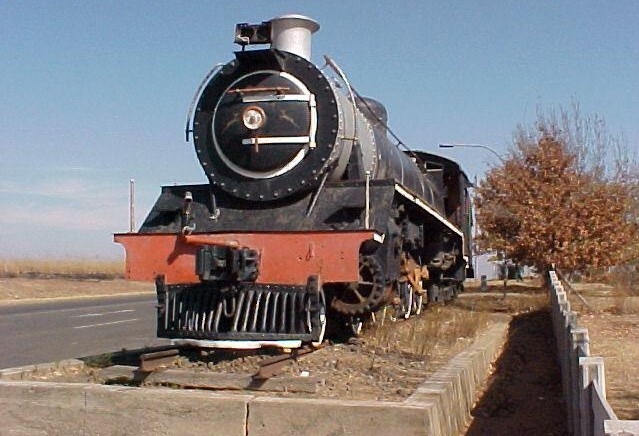
No. 1369 in Breyten, Mpumalanga, 11 June 2005

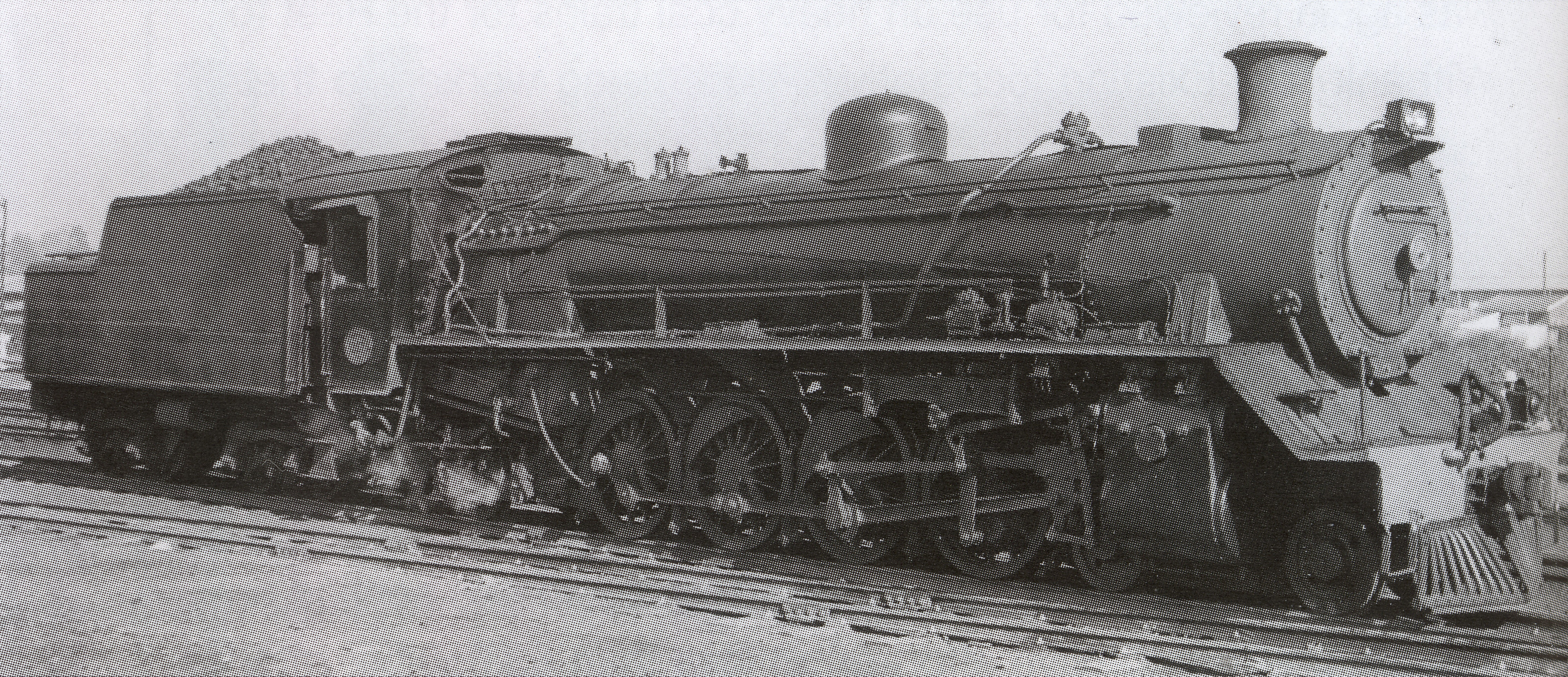
No. 1367, the only Class 19R, at work in Empangeni, Natal, c. 1966
