= Felixton College =

Coordinates: 28°49′43″S 31°53′36″E

- 1 Club Lane; Felixton, KwaZulu-Natal, 3875; South Africa

Information
- Motto: Honour God, Honour Self, Honour Others, Honour the Environment
- Religious affiliation: Christianity
- Founded: March 13, 1996 (age 30)
- Headmaster: Mr Wayne Rademan (since 2020)
- Grades: RRRR–R, and 1–12
- Gender: co-ed
- Age range: 3–18
- Houses: Apollo; Vulcan; Neptune
- Colors
- Sports: Athletics, cricket, cross country, golf, hockey, netball, rugby, soccer, squash, swimming, tennis

Felixton College is a small school based 15 minutes outside of Empangeni, KwaZulu-Natal, South Africa, in the village of Felixton. It caters from junior school to high school (Grades RRRR through to 12). The Felixton College is a member of the Independent Examinations Board (IEB), a South African independent assessment agency which offers examinations for various client schools. Felixton College, alongside St Catherine's and Grantleigh, is one of the key private schools in the King Cetshwayo District.

The school offers numerous sports and after-school activities. Alongside extensive playing fields, the school have a swimming pool, tennis and squash courts and astro turf, and a golf course provided by the Felixton Country Club.

== History ==
The idea began as late as 1995 by parents of the neighbouring towns of Empangeni and Richards Bay as there was a high demand for a private school in the area. The school would receive its first pupils in January 1996. The school would have few grades available in the beginning, however it would grow in the following years and by the end of the 1990s, Felixton College had grown to incorporate a high school, with their first Grade 12s matriculating in 2000. The school continued to grow structurally as more classrooms were added. In 2006, the school buried a time capsule in front of the school flag poles in celebration of the college's 10th anniversary. The capsule is due to be opened in 2026 on the event of the school's 30th anniversary.

=== Covid-19 Pandemic ===
In 2020, the college, like many, had to adapt to technology as the COVID-19 pandemic disrupted ordinary school activity. Classes were held online for all grades except for those in Grade 12 or matric. This would continue until 2021 where a routine of semi-online school was practiced. Some grades would attend on certain days of the week and some on the other days, this would limit the amount of students from different grades from interacting with each other. By mid-2022, most lockdown restriction were lifted and pre-pandemic routine began to continue.

=== New Classrooms and Solar Panels ===
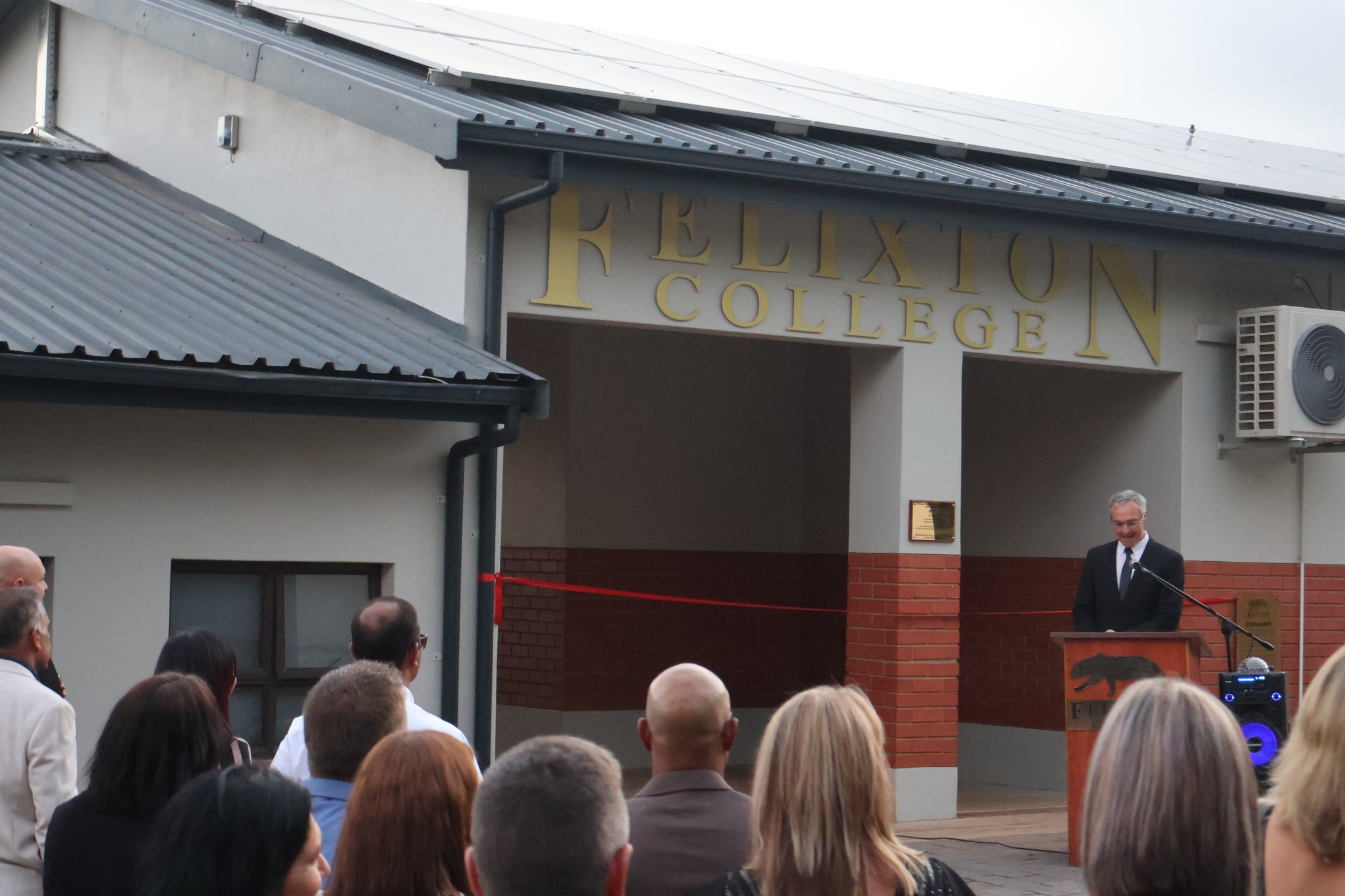
Headmaster Wayne Rademan officially opening the newly built junior school classroom complex in July 2023

For almost 20 years, the Felixton College Junior School (Grades 1–7) had been pre-fab classrooms. These were demolished in 2022 and construction then began on modern, brick classrooms as well as new junior school bathrooms and a state of the art computer centre. Construction stretched from late 2022 to July 2023. Around the same time, the school installed solar panels which produces power for the entire school. This was due to the ongoing scheduled black outs or loadshedding caused by the South African energy crisis.

== Leadership ==
Council Chairman

- Jeremy Nottingham, 1996

=== Headmasters ===
- 1st, Mr Paul Daffon, 1997–2001
- 2nd, Mr Rob Dickson, 2001–2006
- 3rd, Mr Ken Krige, 2007–2013
- 4th, Mr Craig Neave, 2014–2019
- 5th, Mr Wayne Rademan, 2020–present

Each headmasters' portrait is on display in the Felixton College lobby, also known as the 'Felixton Hall of Fame'.

=== Senior (High school) Executive Heads ===
Head Boy (left) & Head Girl (right)

- 2000, M. Paxman & M. van Staden
- 2001, S. Kommer & M. Wright
- 2002, N. Sabela & G. Charman
- 2003, L. Beelen & L. Randall
- 2004, D. du Randt & M. van der Merwe
- 2005, W. Armstrong & T. van Rooven
- 2006, N. Mashaba & C. Cartwright
- 2007, C. Watkins & K. Neave
- 2008, R. Cambell & C. Seale
- 2009, G. Krige & M. Govender
- 2010, J. Naidu & K. Ayliffe
- 2011, C. Steenkamp & C. Prinsloo
- 2012, T. Dlamini & M. Mittermayer
- 2013, C. Mkhwanazi & E. Louw
- 2014, vacant & S. Ntuli
- 2015, M. Louw & L. Hunt
- 2016, T. van der Spuy & A. Mittermayer
- 2017, T. Fernandes & T. Fish
- 2018, M. Zondi & vacant
- 2019, R. Louw & N. Lombard
- 2020, C. Wickham & C. Poustie
- 2021, M. Rottcher & L. Ntshangase
- 2022, A. Reddy & L. Kunene
- 2023, M. Ntshangase & K. Schnell
- 2024, A. Stewart & R. Mthembu
- 2025, L. Zulu & A. Wood
- 2026, R. Whittaker & U. Mzulwini
- 2027, M. Wheeler & Z. Mncwabe
