= Felixton =

- Location within KwaZulu-Natal Location within South Africa
- Coordinates: 28.831°S 31.894°E
- Country: South Africa
- Province: KwaZulu-Natal
- District: King Cetshwayo
- Municipality: uMhlathuze
- Main Place: Empangeni

Area
  - Total: 2.38 km^{2} (0.92 sq mi)

Population (2011)
  - Total: 1,023
  - Density: 430/km^{2} (1,110/sq mi)

Racial makeup (2011)
  - Black African: 66.7%
  - Coloured: 1.2%
  - Indian/Asian: 11.4%
  - White: 20.5%
  - Other: 0.1%

First languages (2011)
  - Zulu: 52.5%
  - English: 31.7%
  - Afrikaans: 8.3%
  - Swazi: 1.4%
  - Other: 6.1%
- Time zone: UTC+2 (SAST)
- PO box: 3875

Felixton is a town in King Cetshwayo District Municipality in the KwaZulu-Natal province of South Africa.

Village 10 km south-east of Empangeni, first settled in 1907. Said to have been named either after Viscount Herbert John Gladstone, nicknamed Felix, or after a local pioneer, Felix Piccione. The local sugar mill is one of the largest in country.

== Sources ==
- Erasmus, B.P.J.: Op Pad in Suid-Afrika. 1995. ISBN 1-86842-026-4
- Rosenthal, Eric: 'Ensiklopedie van Suidelike Afrika. 1967
