= South African Class 15CA 4-8-2 =

1926 design of steam locomotive

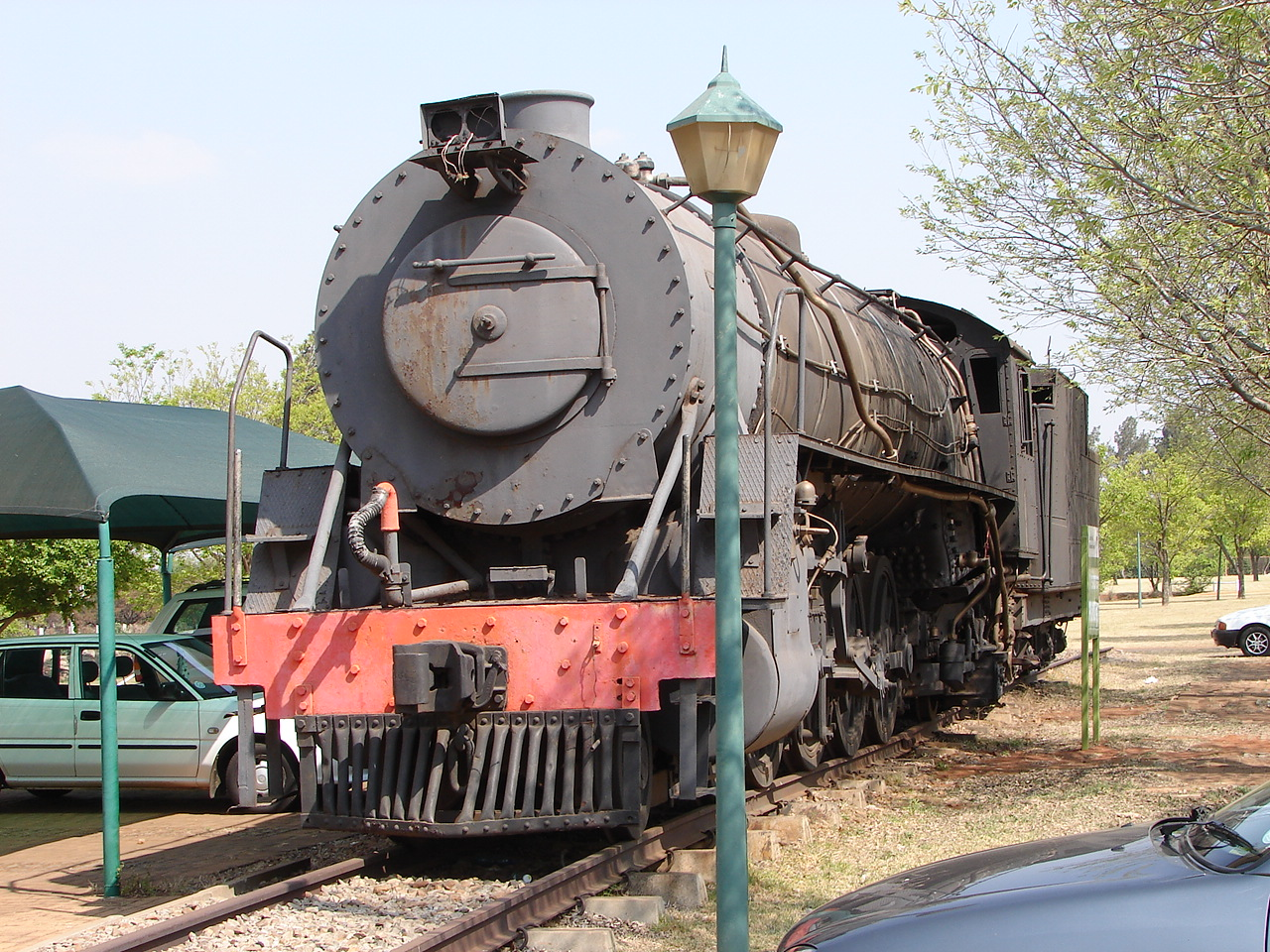
- No. 2802 at Esselen Park, 21 September 2009
Type and origin
- ♠ With 57 inch (1,448 mm) coupled wheels ♥ With 60 inch (1,524 mm) coupled wheels ♣ 23x28 Cylinders - ♦ 24x28 Cylinders - ʘ Reboilered ʘ No. 2039-2059, 2072-2073 ʘ No. 2074-2077, 2801-2839 - ʘ No. 2840-2857
- Power type: Steam
- Designer: South African Railways (Col F.R. Collins DSO)
- Builder: American Locomotive Company; Baldwin Locomotive Works; Società Italiana Ernesto Breda; North British Locomotive Company
- Serial number: ALCO 66986-67008, Baldwin 60828-60831, Breda 2236-2245, NBL 23774-23802, 24008-24025
- Model: Class 15CA
- Build date: 1926-1929
- Total produced: 84
Specifications
- Configuration
  - Whyte: 4-8-2 (Mountain)
  - UIC: 2'D1'h2
- Driver: 2nd coupled axle
- Gauge: 3 ft 6 in (1,067 mm) Cape gauge
- Leading dia.: 30 in (762 mm)
- Coupled dia.: ♠ 57 in (1,448 mm) ♥ 60 in (1,524 mm)
- Trailing dia.: ʘʘ 33 in (838 mm) ʘ 34 in (864 mm)
- Tender wheels: 34 in (864 mm)
- Wheelbase: 65 ft 3 1/4 in (19,895 mm)
  - Engine: 35 ft 8 in (10,871 mm)
  - Leading: 6 ft 10 in (2,083 mm)
  - Coupled: 15 ft 9 in (4,801 mm)
  - Tender: 20 ft 5 in (6,223 mm)
  - Tender bogie: 6 ft 2 in (1,880 mm)
- Length
  - Over couplers: 73 ft 3 1/4 in (22,333 mm)
- Height: ♠ 12 ft 10 in (3,912 mm) ♥ 12 ft 11 1/2 in (3,950 mm)
- Frame type: Bar
- Axle load: ♠ʘ 17 LT 9 cwt (17,730 kg) ♠ʘ 17 LT 12 cwt (17,880 kg) ♠ʘ 17 LT 10 cwt (17,780 kg) ♥ʘ 17 LT 15 cwt (18,030 kg) ♥ʘ 17 LT 18 cwt (18,190 kg) ♥ʘ 17 LT 16 cwt (18,090 kg)
  - Leading: ♠ʘ 19 LT 12 cwt (19,910 kg) ♠ʘ 19 LT 7 cwt (19,660 kg) ♠ʘ 21 LT 7 cwt (21,690 kg) ♥ʘ 19 LT 12 cwt (19,910 kg) ♥ʘ 19 LT 7 cwt (19,660 kg) ♥ʘ 21 LT 7 cwt (21,690 kg)
  - 1st coupled: ♠ʘ 17 LT 6 cwt (17,580 kg) ♠ʘ 17 LT 10 cwt (17,780 kg) ♠ʘ 17 LT 6 cwt (17,580 kg) ♥ʘ 17 LT 9 cwt (17,730 kg) ♥ʘ 17 LT 13 cwt (17,930 kg) ♥ʘ 17 LT 9 cwt (17,730 kg)
  - 2nd coupled: ♠ʘ 17 LT 9 cwt (17,730 kg) ♠ʘ 17 LT 12 cwt (17,880 kg) ♠ʘ 17 LT 10 cwt (17,780 kg) ♥ʘ 17 LT 15 cwt (18,030 kg) ♥ʘ 17 LT 18 cwt (18,190 kg) ♥ʘ 17 LT 16 cwt (18,090 kg)
  - 3rd coupled: ♠ʘ 17 LT 7 cwt (17,630 kg) ♠ʘ 17 LT 11 cwt (17,830 kg) ♠ʘ 17 LT 6 cwt (17,580 kg) ♥ʘ 17 LT 13 cwt (17,930 kg) ♥ʘ 17 LT 17 cwt (18,140 kg) ♥ʘ 17 LT 12 cwt (17,880 kg)
  - 4th coupled: ♠ʘ 17 LT 4 cwt (17,480 kg) ♠ʘ 17 LT 7 cwt (17,630 kg) ♠ʘ 17 LT 3 cwt (17,430 kg) ♥ʘ 17 LT 10 cwt (17,780 kg) ♥ʘ 17 LT 13 cwt (17,930 kg) ♥ʘ 17 LT 9 cwt (17,730 kg)
  - Trailing: ♠ʘ 14 LT 9 cwt (14,680 kg) ♠ʘ 14 LT 16 cwt (15,040 kg) ♠ʘ 14 LT 13 cwt (14,890 kg) ♥ʘ 14 LT 9 cwt (14,680 kg) ♥ʘ 14 LT 16 cwt (15,040 kg) ♥ʘ 14 LT 13 cwt (14,890 kg)
  - Tender bogie: Bogie 1: 33 LT 18 cwt (34,440 kg); Bogie 2: 35 LT 10 cwt (36,070 kg)
  - Tender axle: 17 LT 15 cwt (18,030 kg)
- Adhesive weight: ♠ʘ 69 LT 6 cwt (70,410 kg) ♠ʘ 70 LT (71,120 kg) ♠ʘ 69 LT 5 cwt (70,360 kg) ♥ʘ 70 LT 7 cwt (71,480 kg) ♥ʘ 71 LT 1 cwt (72,190 kg) ♥ʘ 70 LT 6 cwt (71,430 kg)
- Loco weight: ♠ʘ 103 LT 7 cwt (105,000 kg) ♠ʘ 104 LT 3 cwt (105,800 kg) ♠ʘ 105 LT 5 cwt (106,900 kg) ♥ʘ 104 LT 8 cwt (106,100 kg) ♥ʘ 105 LT 4 cwt (106,900 kg) ♥ʘ 106 LT 6 cwt (108,000 kg)
- Tender weight: 69 LT 8 cwt (70,510 kg)
- Total weight: ♠ʘ 172 LT 15 cwt (175,500 kg) ♠ʘ 173 LT 11 cwt (176,300 kg) ♠ʘ 174 LT 13 cwt (177,500 kg) ♥ʘ 173 LT 16 cwt (176,600 kg) ♥ʘ 174 LT 12 cwt (177,400 kg) ♥ʘ 175 LT 14 cwt (178,500 kg)
- Tender type: KT (2-axle bogies)
- Fuel type: Coal
- Fuel capacity: 14 LT (14.2 t)
- Water cap.: 6,000 imp gal (27,300 L)
- Firebox
  - Type: Round-top
  - Grate area: 48 sq ft (4.5 m^{2})
- Boiler
  - Pitch: ♠ 8 ft 6 in (2,591 mm) ♥ 8 ft 7 1/2 in (2,629 mm)
  - Diameter: 6 ft 2 1/4 in (1,886 mm)
  - Tube plates: 20 ft 1/2 in (6,109 mm)
  - Small tubes: ♠♥ 143: 2 1/4 in (57 mm) ʘ 117: 2 1/4 in (57 mm)
  - Large tubes: ♠♥ 30: 5 1/2 in (140 mm) ʘ 34: 5 1/2 in (140 mm)
- Boiler pressure: ♠ 200 psi (1,379 kPa) ♥ 210 psi (1,448 kPa)
- Safety valve: Pop
- Heating surface
  - Firebox: 200 sq ft (19 m^{2})
  - Tubes: ♠♥ 2,554 sq ft (237.3 m^{2}) ʘ 2,361 sq ft (219.3 m^{2})
  - Arch tubes: 23 sq ft (2.1 m^{2})
  - Total surface: ♠♥ 2,777 sq ft (258.0 m^{2}) ʘ 2,584 sq ft (240.1 m^{2})
- Superheater
  - Type: Schmidt
  - Heating area: ♠♥ 716 sq ft (66.5 m^{2}) ʘ 670 sq ft (62 m^{2})
- Cylinders: Two
- Cylinder size: ♣ 23 in (584 mm) bore ♦ 24 in (610 mm) bore ♣♦ 28 in (711 mm) stroke
- Valve gear: Walschaerts
- Valve type: Piston
- Couplers: Johnston link-and-pin AAR knuckle (1930s)
Performance figures
- Tractive effort: ♠♣ 38,980 lbf (173.4 kN) @ 75% ♠♦ 42,440 lbf (188.8 kN) @ 75% ♥♣ 38,880 lbf (172.9 kN) @ 75% ♥♦ 42,340 lbf (188.3 kN) @ 75%
Career
- Operators: South African Railways
- Class: Class 15CA
- Number in class: 84
- Numbers: 2039–2059, 2072-2077, 2801-2857
- Delivered: 1926-1930
- First run: 1926
- Withdrawn: 1980s
- ♠ The leading coupled axle had flangeless wheels

The South African Railways Class 15CA 4-8-2 of 1926 was a steam locomotive.

In 1926, the South African Railways placed 23 Class 15CA steam locomotives with a 4-8-2 Mountain type wheel arrangement in service. Another 61 engines were ordered and delivered from three manufacturers in 1929 and 1930.

== Class 15C redesign ==
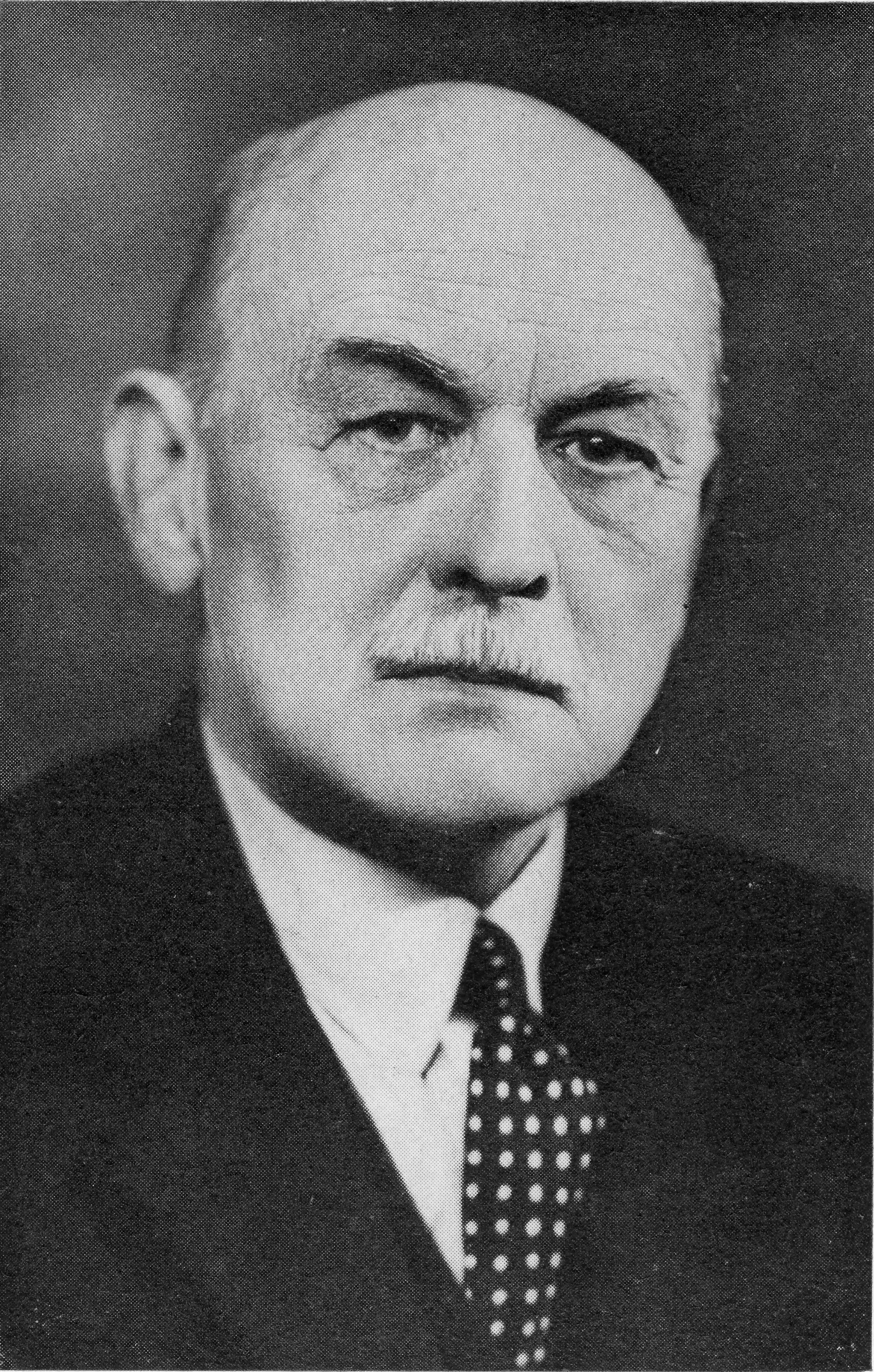
Col F.R. Collins DSO

After the twelve Class 15C Big Bill 4-8-2 Mountain type locomotives which were delivered by Baldwin Locomotive Works in 1925 had been in service a short while, it was discovered that the frames under the front of the firebox had a tendency to crack, necessitating heavy repairs.

To overcome this, a new modified design was prepared by Col F.R. Collins DSO, the Chief Mechanical Engineer (CME) of the South African Railways (SAR), for an almost identical locomotive but with the frames shortened to the front of the firebox and widened under the firebox by means of a bridle casting.

== Manufacturers ==
The first batch of 23 of these redesigned locomotives were built for the SAR by the American Locomotive Company (ALCO). They were delivered in 1926, numbered in the range from 2039 to 2059, 2072 and 2073, and designated Class 15CA. The "A" supposedly indicated the manufacturer ALCO rather than, as was usual SAR practice, a different version of an existing locomotive type.

The earlier Baldwin-built Class 15C was then reclassified to Class 15CB for no good reason, since the "B" merely indicated the manufacturer Baldwin and not, as was usual practice, a branchline locomotive.

Another 61 Class 15CA locomotives were acquired in four batches from three other manufacturers in 1929 and 1930. Like the 23 ALCO-built locomotives, all except the last batch were built with 23 inches (584 millimetres) bore cylinders.

- In 1929, four engines were delivered by Baldwin Locomotive Works in the United States of America, numbered in the range from 2074 to 2077.
- Also in 1929, ten locomotives were delivered by Società Italiana Ernesto Breda of Milan in Italy (now AnsaldoBreda), numbered in the range from 2801 to 2810.
- Also in 1929, 29 engines were built by the North British Locomotive Company (NBL) and delivered in that same year, numbered in the range from 2811 to 2839.
- The last 18 Class 15CA locomotives were also built by NBL in 1929. These were delivered in 1930 and numbered in the range from 2840 to 2857. This last batch of engines were built with larger 24 inches (610 millimetres) bore cylinders and larger diameter trailing wheels.

== Characteristics ==
Apart from the redesigned frame under the firebox, these locomotives were very similar to the Class 15C in proportions and appearance. They also had Coale pop type safety valves, a Schmidt type superheater and a combustion chamber in the firebox, which was equipped with flexible side stays and water siphon arch tubes. Their coupled wheel axleboxes, crank pins and connecting rod big ends were grease lubricated. These engines used the same Type KT tenders with a coal capacity of 14 long tons (14.2 tonnes) and a water capacity of 6,000 imperial gallons (27,300 litres).

== Modifications ==
=== Retyring ===
The locomotives were delivered with 57 inches (1,448 millimetres) diameter coupled wheels and their boilers were set at an operating pressure of 200 pounds per square inch (1,379 kilopascals). All their coupled wheels were eventually retyred to a 60 inches (1,524 millimetres) diameter and to compensate for the loss of tractive effort due to the larger diameter wheels, their operating boiler pressure was increased from 200 to 210 pounds per square inch (1,379 to 1,448 kilopascals) by an adjustment of the setting of their safety valves. This modification enabled these mixed traffic locomotives to handle the fastest mainline passenger trains.

In addition, all those locomotives which had been built with 23 inches (584 millimetres) bore cylinders had their cylinders reamed to a bore of 24 inches (610 millimetres).

When larger tyres were fitted to their coupled wheels, the old tyres were left in position and turned down on the wheel centres to serve as liners and the new tyres were then shrunk on over the liners. The leading coupled wheels, which had been flangeless as built, were flanged during the retyring. The practice of increasing the diameter of coupled wheels, wheel spacing and other considerations permitting, was begun by A.G. Watson during his term in office as CME and was continued by his successors. The reduction of tractive effort caused by the larger wheels was made up by increasing boiler pressure or by fitting larger cylinders or both, as required. This policy resulted in more mileage between heavy repairs, less cost-per-mile on repairs and locomotives capable of higher speeds.

=== Reboilering ===
During the early 1940s, three of the Class 15CB and Class 15CA locomotives were reboilered with new boilers numbered in the range from 9504 to 9506. These boilers were of similar dimensions as the originals but with a different tube arrangement. It was designed by Dr. M.M. Loubser, CME at the time. The reboilered locomotives were not reclassified.

== Service ==
=== South African Railways ===
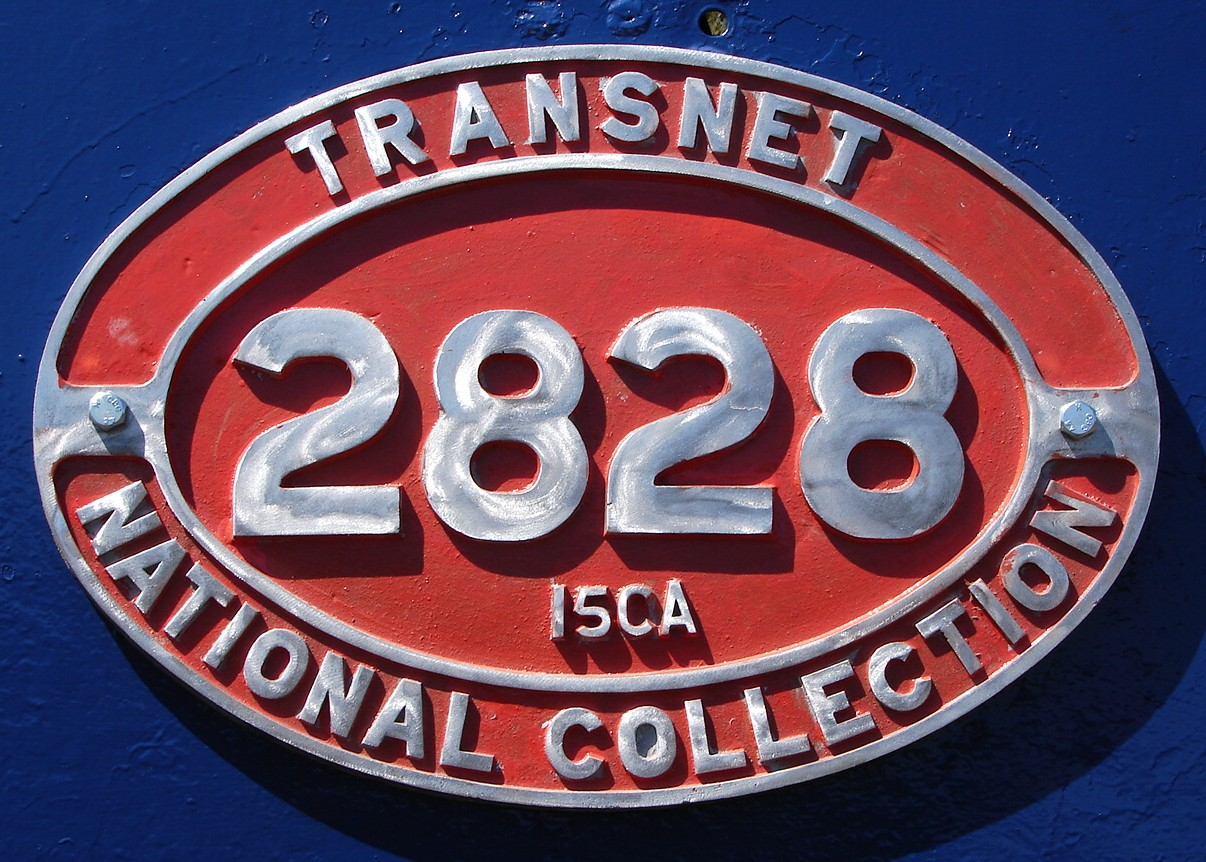

The Class 15CA locomotives were placed in service on the mainline between Cape Town and Kimberley but like the Class 15CB, they were later transferred to Bloemfontein. From here they worked throughout the Free State until they were eventually relocated to the Eastern Transvaal system. There they worked out of Pretoria to Pietersburg in the north and from there to Tzaneen in the east and Messina on the Rhodesian border in the north. Some also worked out of Witbank and Breyten.

In the early 1960s, a few joined the Class 15CB on the National North Coast line. Here they were used on, amongst others, the night and day passenger trains to and from Empangeni on the north coast line and on passenger trains to and from Kelso on the south coast line. In 1983, they all went from there to the Cape Northern system for use on the lines from Beaconsfield in Kimberley, working north to Mafeking and south to De Aar. Eventually nearly forty of them ended up as heavy shunters at Kaserne and Germiston in Johannesburg where they replaced the Class 12AR and Class S1.

15CA 2828 is now plinthed at the Gospel Express, Vinkrivier Station, R60, Robertson, is the Western Cape, South Africa. 2828 completes the 11 coaches stationed at Vink, as accommodation for the Gospel Express Christian Centre.

=== Industry ===
Three Class 15CA locomotives were sold into industrial service. Numbers 2807 and 2839 went to Dunn's Locomotive Works and were eventually sold to Rustenburg Platinum Mines. No. 2811 went to South Witbank Colliery as their no. 4.

== Works numbers ==
The table lists the Class 15CA engine numbers, builders, years built and the builders' works numbers. The colour coding following the engine numbers refers to the three axle loadings of the different batches of the Class 15CA, as shown in the table of specifications.

Class 15CA 4-8-2 Builders & Works Numbers
SAR No.	Builder	Year	Works No.
2039 ʘ	ALCO	1926	66986
2040 ʘ	ALCO	1926	66987
2041 ʘ	ALCO	1926	66988
2042 ʘ	ALCO	1926	66989
2043 ʘ	ALCO	1926	66990
2044 ʘ	ALCO	1926	66991
2045 ʘ	ALCO	1926	66992
2046 ʘ	ALCO	1926	66993
2047 ʘ	ALCO	1926	66994
2048 ʘ	ALCO	1926	66995
2049 ʘ	ALCO	1926	66996
2050 ʘ	ALCO	1926	66997
2051 ʘ	ALCO	1926	66998
2052 ʘ	ALCO	1926	66999
2053 ʘ	ALCO	1926	67000
2054 ʘ	ALCO	1926	67001
2055 ʘ	ALCO	1926	67002
2056 ʘ	ALCO	1926	67003
2057 ʘ	ALCO	1926	67004
2058 ʘ	ALCO	1926	67005
2059 ʘ	ALCO	1926	67006
2072 ʘ	ALCO	1926	67007
2073 ʘ	ALCO	1926	67008
2074 ʘ	Baldwin	1929	60828
2075 ʘ	Baldwin	1929	60829
2076 ʘ	Baldwin	1929	60830
2077 ʘ	Baldwin	1929	60831
2801 ʘ	Breda	1929	2236
2802 ʘ	Breda	1929	2237
2803 ʘ	Breda	1929	2238
2804 ʘ	Breda	1929	2239
2805 ʘ	Breda	1929	2240
2806 ʘ	Breda	1929	2241
2807 ʘ	Breda	1929	2242
2808 ʘ	Breda	1929	2243
2809 ʘ	Breda	1929	2244
2810 ʘ	Breda	1929	2245
2811 ʘ	NBL	1928	23774
2812 ʘ	NBL	1928	23775
2813 ʘ	NBL	1928	23776
2814 ʘ	NBL	1928	23777
2815 ʘ	NBL	1928	23778
2816 ʘ	NBL	1928	23779
2817 ʘ	NBL	1928	23780
2818 ʘ	NBL	1928	23781
2819 ʘ	NBL	1928	23782
2820 ʘ	NBL	1928	23783
2821 ʘ	NBL	1928	23784
2822 ʘ	NBL	1928	23785
2823 ʘ	NBL	1928	23786
2824 ʘ	NBL	1928	23787
2825 ʘ	NBL	1928	23788
2826 ʘ	NBL	1928	23789
2827 ʘ	NBL	1928	23790
2828 ʘ	NBL	1928	23791
2829 ʘ	NBL	1928	23792
2830 ʘ	NBL	1928	23793
2831 ʘ	NBL	1928	23794
2832 ʘ	NBL	1928	23795
2833 ʘ	NBL	1928	23796
2834 ʘ	NBL	1928	23797
2835 ʘ	NBL	1928	23798
2836 ʘ	NBL	1928	23799
2837 ʘ	NBL	1928	23800
2838 ʘ	NBL	1928	23801
2839 ʘ	NBL	1928	23802
2840 ʘ	NBL	1929	24008
2841 ʘ	NBL	1929	24009
2842 ʘ	NBL	1929	24010
2843 ʘ	NBL	1929	24011
2844 ʘ	NBL	1929	24012
2845 ʘ	NBL	1929	24013
2846 ʘ	NBL	1929	24014
2847 ʘ	NBL	1929	24015
2848 ʘ	NBL	1929	24016
2849 ʘ	NBL	1929	24017
2850 ʘ	NBL	1929	24018
2851 ʘ	NBL	1929	24019
2852 ʘ	NBL	1929	24020
2853 ʘ	NBL	1929	24021
2854 ʘ	NBL	1929	24022
2855 ʘ	NBL	1929	24023
2856 ʘ	NBL	1929	24024
2857 ʘ	NBL	1929	24025

== Preservation ==
Number	Works nmr	THF / Private	Leaselend / Owner	Current Location	Outside South Africa	?
2039	ALCO 66986	THF/Private	MISLPT (Michael Barclay)	Krugersdorp Locomotive Depot		Ownership Unclear
2040	ALCO 66987	THF/Private	MISLPT (Michael Barclay)	Krugersdorp Locomotive Depot		Ownership Unclear
2041	ALCO 66988	THF/Private	MISLPT (Michael Barclay)	Krugersdorp Locomotive Depot		Ownership Unclear
2055	ALCO 67005	THF		Rustenburg (Station)		
2056	ALCO 67003	THF	Reefsteamers	Germiston Locomotive Depot		
2077	BAL 60831	THF/Private	MISLPT (Michael Barclay)	Krugersdorp Locomotive Depot		Ownership Unclear
2802	BREDA 2237	THF		Esslenpark Railway College		
2803	BREDA 2238	THF/Private	MISLPT (Michael Barclay)	Krugersdorp Locomotive Depot		Ownership Unclear
2804	BREDA 2239	THF		Esslenpark Railway College		
2820	NBL 23783	THF/Private	MISLPT (Michael Barclay)	Krugersdorp Locomotive Depot		Ownership Unclear
2825	NBL 23788	THF		Krugersdorp Locomotive Depot		
2828	NBL 23791	THF	Gospel Express	Vink (Station)		
2833	NBL 23796	THF		Krugersdorp Locomotive Depot		
2836	NBL 23799	THF		Krugersdorp Locomotive Depot		
2850	NBL 24018	THF	Wonder Steam Trains	Hermanstad Depot		
2853	NBL 24021	THF		Krugersdorp Locomotive Depot		

== Illustration ==
The main picture shows Breda-built no. 2802, serving as school guard at Esselen Park, the Transnet School of Rail in Kaalfontein, Gauteng, on 21 September 2009.

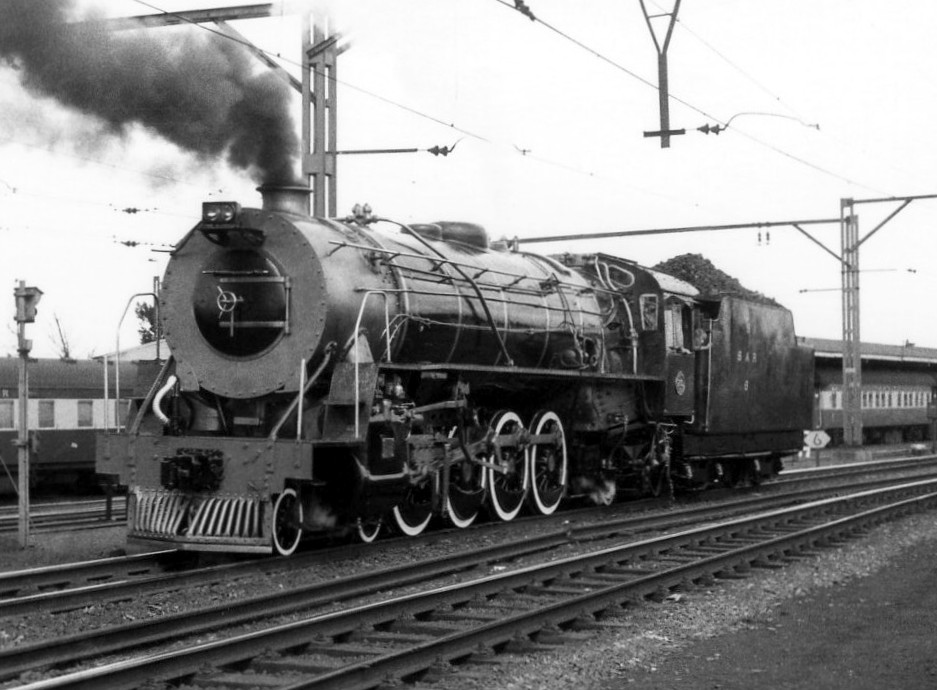
NBL-built no. 2850 at Kroonstad, Orange Free State, 22 April 1979

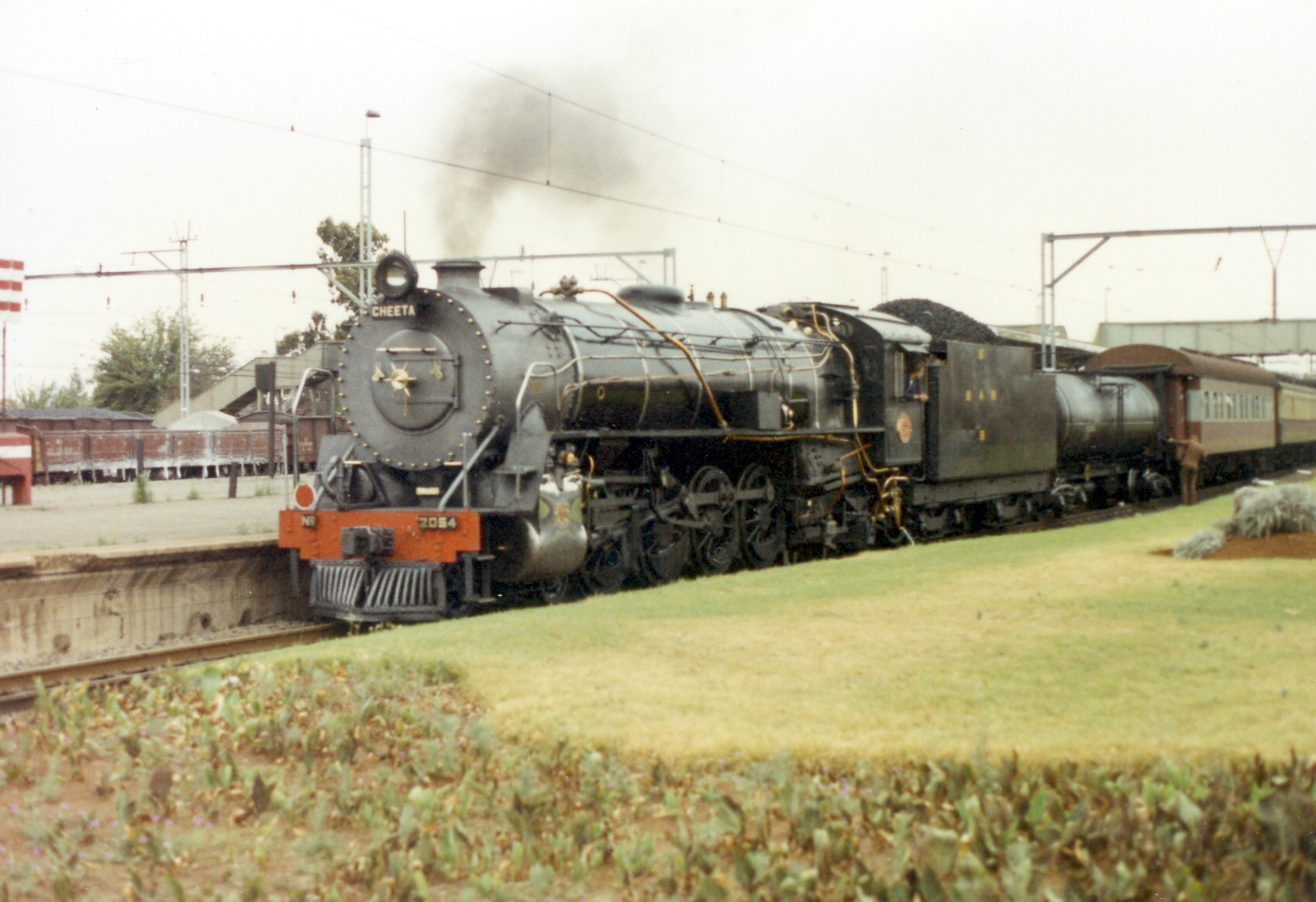
ALCO-built no. 2054 Cheeta at Vereeniging, 7 October 1989

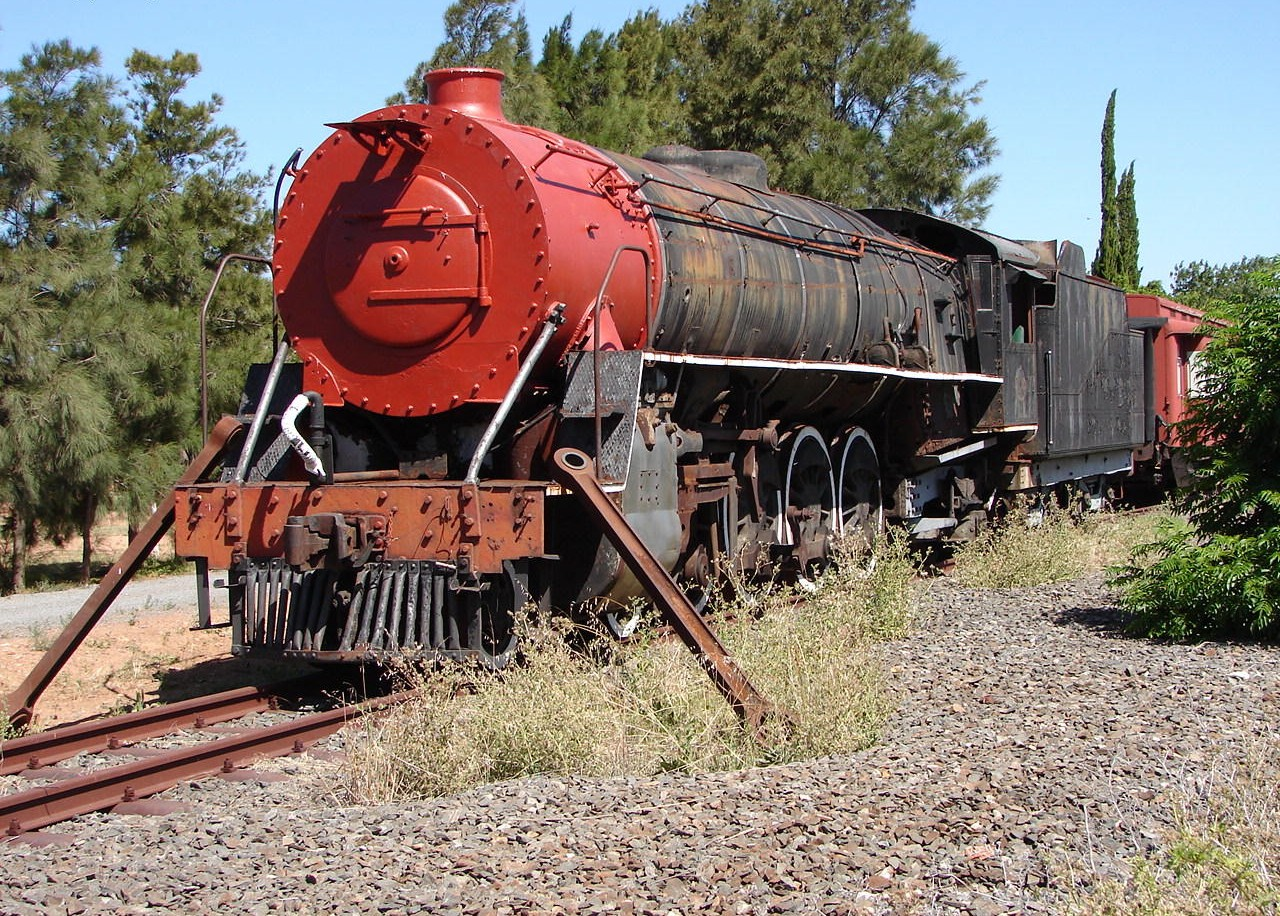
NBL-built no. 2828, staged at Vink siding near Robertson, 11 January 2008.

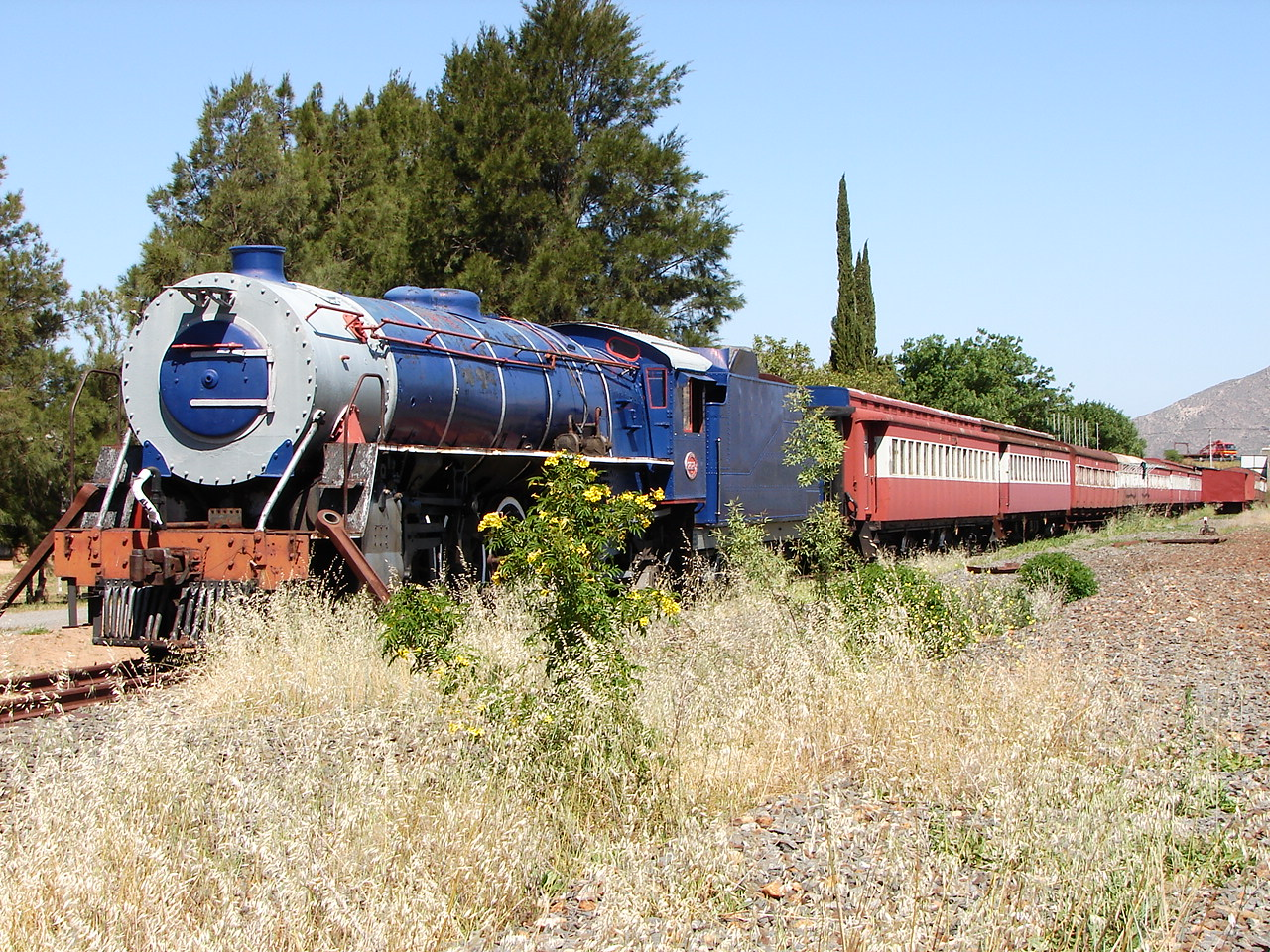
NBL-built no. 2828, now in royal blue and with number plates, 20 October 2009.
