= South African Class 19A 4-8-2 =

1929 design of steam locomotive

South African Class 19A & 19AR 4-8-2
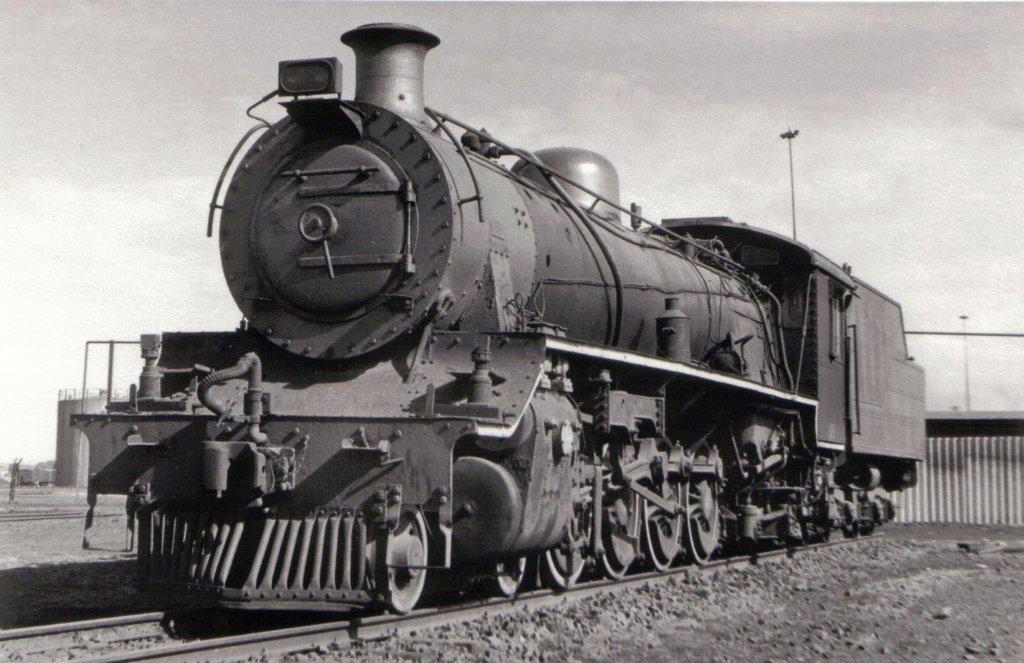
- Class 19A no. 685 at De Aar, 16 October 1978
Type and origin
- ♠ Class 19A as built with a round-topped firebox ♥ Class 19AR rebuilt with a Watson Standard boiler
- Power type: Steam
- Designer: South African Railways (Col F.R. Collins DSO)
- Builder: Swiss Locomotive and Machine
- Serial number: 3300–3335
- Model: Class 19A
- Build date: 1929
- Total produced: 36
Specifications
- Configuration
  - Whyte: 4-8-2 (Mountain)
  - UIC: 2'D1'h2
- Driver: 2nd coupled axle
- Gauge: 3 ft 6 in (1,067 mm) Cape gauge
- Leading dia.: 28 1/2 in (724 mm)
- Coupled dia.: 51 in (1,295 mm)
- Trailing dia.: 33 in (838 mm)
- Tender wheels: 34 in (864 mm)
- Wheelbase: 58 ft 7 5/8 in (17,872 mm)
  - Axle spacing (Asymmetrical): 1-2: 4 ft 10 in (1,473 mm); 2-3: 4 ft 9 in (1,448 mm); 3-4: 4 ft 10 in (1,473 mm)
  - Engine: 32 ft 2 in (9,804 mm)
  - Leading: 6 ft 2 in (1,880 mm)
  - Coupled: 14 ft 5 in (4,394 mm)
  - Tender: 16 ft 9 in (5,105 mm)
  - Tender bogie: 4 ft 7 in (1,397 mm)
- Length
  - Over couplers: 67 ft 6 in (20,574 mm)
- Height: ♠ 12 ft 10 7/8 in (3,934 mm) ♥ 12 ft 11 7/8 in (3,959 mm)
- Frame type: Bar
- Axle load: ♠ 13 LT 4 cwt (13,410 kg) ♥ 13 LT 1 cwt (13,260 kg)
  - Leading: ♠ 13 LT 12 cwt (13,820 kg) ♥ 13 LT 12 cwt (13,820 kg)
  - 1st coupled: ♠ 12 LT 17 cwt (13,060 kg) ♥ 12 LT 15 cwt (12,950 kg)
  - 2nd coupled: ♠ 13 LT 4 cwt (13,410 kg) ♥ 13 LT 1 cwt (13,260 kg)
  - 3rd coupled: ♠ 12 LT 17 cwt (13,060 kg) ♥ 12 LT 15 cwt (12,950 kg)
  - 4th coupled: ♠ 12 LT 15 cwt (12,950 kg) ♥ 12 LT 12 cwt (12,800 kg)
  - Trailing: ♠ 9 LT 18 cwt (10,060 kg) ♥ 11 LT 7 cwt (11,530 kg)
  - Tender bogie: Bogie 1: 25 LT 15 cwt (26,160 kg); Bogie 2: 25 LT 4 cwt (25,600 kg)
  - Tender axle: 12 LT 17 cwt 2 qtr (13,080 kg)
- Adhesive weight: ♠ 51 LT 13 cwt (52,480 kg) ♥ 51 LT 3 cwt (51,970 kg)
- Loco weight: ♠ 75 LT 3 cwt (76,360 kg) ♥ 76 LT 2 cwt (77,320 kg)
- Tender weight: 50 LT 19 cwt (51,770 kg)
- Total weight: ♠ 126 LT 2 cwt (128,100 kg) ♥ 127 LT 1 cwt (129,100 kg)
- Tender type: MP (2-axle bogies); MP, MP1, MR, MS, MX, MY, MY1 permitted
- Fuel type: Coal
- Fuel capacity: 9 LT 4 cwt (9.3 t)
- Water cap.: 4,250 imp gal (19,300 L)
- Firebox
  - Type: Round-top
  - Grate area: 36 sq ft (3.3 m^{2})
- Boiler
  - Model: Watson Standard no. 1A
  - Pitch: ♠ 8 ft (2,438 mm) ♥ 8 ft 1 in (2,464 mm)
  - Diameter: ♠ 4 ft 10 1/4 in (1,480 mm) ♥ 5 ft (1,524 mm)
  - Tube plates: ♠ 20 ft 3/8 in (6,106 mm) ♥ 20 ft 2 in (6,147 mm)
  - Small tubes: ♠ 86: 2 1/4 in (57 mm) ♥ 76: 2 1/2 in (64 mm)
  - Large tubes: ♠ 18: 5 1/2 in (140 mm) ♥ 24: 5 1/2 in (140 mm)
- Boiler pressure: 200 psi (1,379 kPa)
- Safety valve: Pop
- Heating surface
  - Firebox: ♠ 125 sq ft (11.6 m^{2}) ♥ 123 sq ft (11.4 m^{2})
  - Tubes: ♠ 1,527 sq ft (141.9 m^{2}) ♥ 1,700 sq ft (160 m^{2})
  - Arch tubes: ♠ 15 sq ft (1.4 m^{2}) ♥ 16 sq ft (1.5 m^{2})
  - Total surface: ♠ 1,667 sq ft (154.9 m^{2}) ♥ 1,839 sq ft (170.8 m^{2})
- Superheater
  - Heating area: ♠ 415 sq ft (38.6 m^{2}) ♥ 404 sq ft (37.5 m^{2})
- Cylinders: Two
- Cylinder size: 19 1/2 in (495 mm) bore 26 in (660 mm) stroke
- Valve gear: Walschaerts
- Valve type: Piston
- Couplers: AAR knuckle
Performance figures
- Tractive effort: ♠♥ 29,080 lbf (129.4 kN) @ 75%
Career
- Operators: South African Railways
- Class: Class 19A, 19AR
- Number in class: 36
- Numbers: 675–710
- Delivered: 1929
- First run: 1929
- Withdrawn: c. 1977
- The leading coupled axle had flangeless wheels

The South African Railways Class 19A 4-8-2 of 1929 was a steam locomotive.

In 1929, the South African Railways placed 36 Class 19A steam locomotives with a 4-8-2 Mountain type wheel arrangement in service. Five of them were later reboilered and reclassified to Class 19AR.

== Manufacturer ==
The Class 19A 4-8-2 Mountain type steam locomotive was a later modified version of the successful Class 19 which had been introduced a year earlier. Thirty-six Class 19A engines were delivered by Swiss Locomotive and Machine Works (SLM) of Winterthur in 1929, numbered in the range from 675 to 710.

== Characteristics ==
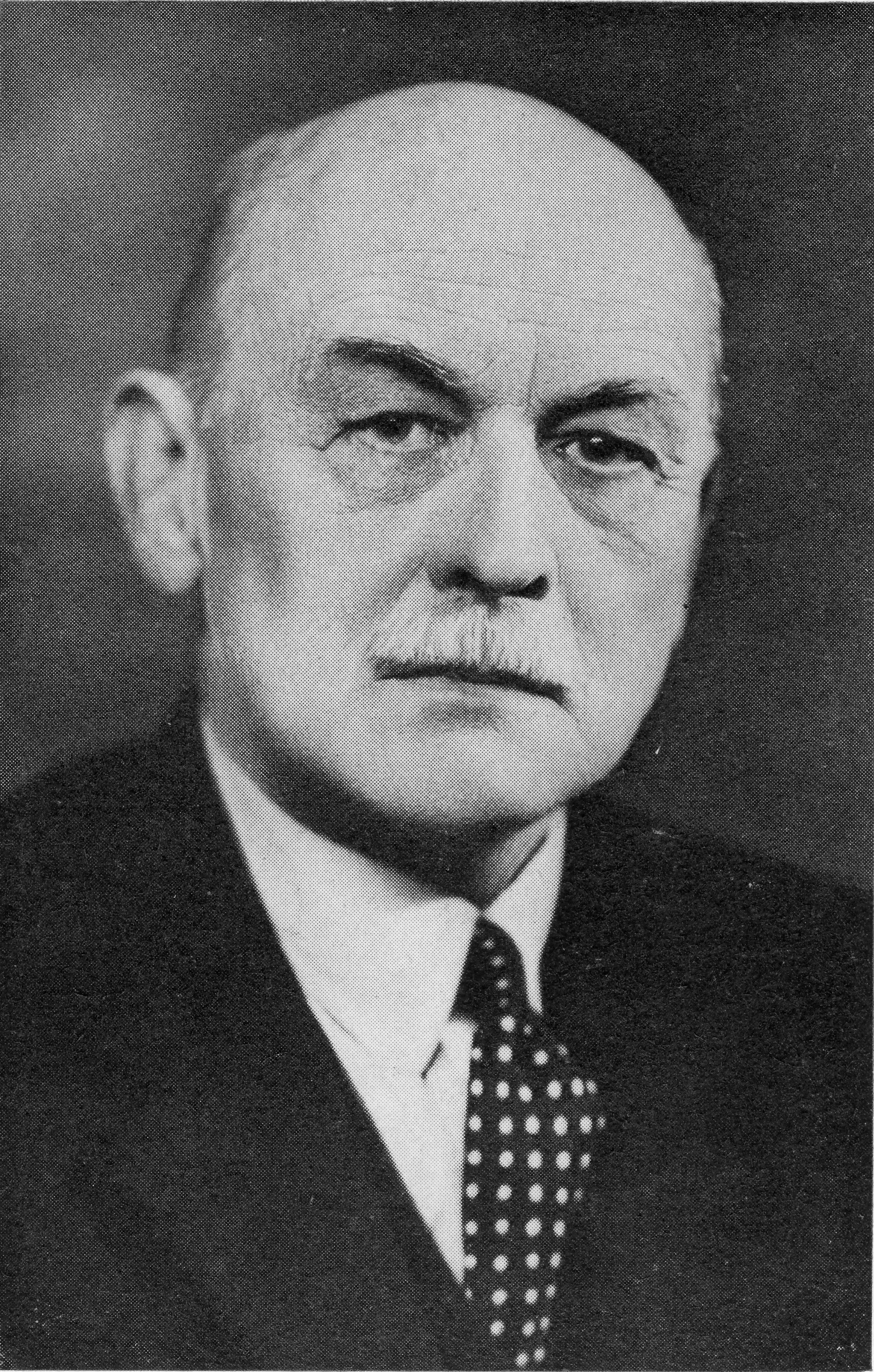
Col F.R. Collins, DSO

Like the Class 19, the Class 19A also had Walschaerts valve gear and a bar frame. Col F.R. Collins DSO, Chief Mechanical Engineer (CME) of the South African Railways (SAR) at the time, redesigned the Class 19 to achieve a lighter axle loading by reducing the coupled wheel diameters from 54 to 51 inches (1,372 to 1,295 millimetres), reducing the cylinder diameter from 21 to 19 1/2 inches (533 to 495 millimetres) and by using a slightly smaller boiler.

The reduction in axle load was to suit some of the lighter branch lines and, as part of the weight reduction, the Class 19A was delivered with a new smaller Type MP tender with a fuel capacity of 9 long tons 4 hundredweight (9.3 tonnes), a water capacity of 4,250 imperial gallons (19,300 litres) and a maximum axle load of 12 long tons 17 hundredweight 2 quarters (13,080 kilograms). The leading coupled wheels had flangeless tyres, but these were later flanged.

While the aim was to reduce the locomotive's total weight for use on some of the more lightly laid branch lines, the actual achieved weight saving was a mere four tons which could hardly have justified the cost of redesigning.

The trailing Bissel truck was constructed with three holes to enable the compensating beam to be fitted at three locations which enabled it to be used to redistribute the engine's weight on the trailing axle. The axle load weights as listed for the Class 19A are with the trailing truck compensating beam pin in the leading of the three holes. The axle load weights as listed for the Class 19AR are with the trailing truck compensating beam pin in the centre hole.

== Watson Standard boilers ==
From the 1930s, many serving locomotives were reboilered with a standard boiler type designed by then CME A.G. Watson as part of his standardisation policy. Such Watson Standard reboilered locomotives were reclassified by adding an "R" suffix to their classification.

Five Class 19A locomotives, numbers 678, 693, 696, 700 and 706, were reboilered with Watson Standard no. 1A boilers and designated Class 19AR. In the reboilering process, at least two of the Class 19AR locomotives, numbers 693 and 696, received domeless boilers from the first batch of Class 19D locomotives which were delivered new with domeless Watson Standard boilers.

The reboilered Class 19AR locomotives gained less than a ton in weight during the modification process. While most locomotive classes which were reboilered with Watson Standard boilers were simultaneously equipped with Watson cabs with slanted fronts, some of the Class 19AR locomotives retained their original cabs with vertical fronts.

On the reboilered Class 19AR there were three versions of cab, since no. 696 had a slanted cab from the running board up and the remains of the squared front cab from the running board down. Apart from the slanted front of the Watson cab, an obvious difference between an original and a Watson Standard reboilered locomotive is usually the cover of the multiple valve regulator which is located in the smokebox, the rectangular object visible just to the rear of the chimney on the reboilered locomotive.

== Service ==
=== South African Railways ===
The Class 19A fleet initially served on all systems of the SAR, but were later based mainly at Mason's Mill, Estcourt and Glencoe in Natal, at East London, Queenstown and Burgersdorp in the Eastern Cape, at Cape Town in the Western Cape and a few in the Western Transvaal.

No. 700 was written off after an accident and by 1977 the rest were all withdrawn from Railways service. Numbers 685, 692 and 693 are known to still survive, no. 685 staged in the open at Queenstown in the Eastern Cape, no. 692 plinthed at Sterkstroom in the Eastern Cape and no. 693 staged at Millsite in Krugersdorp.

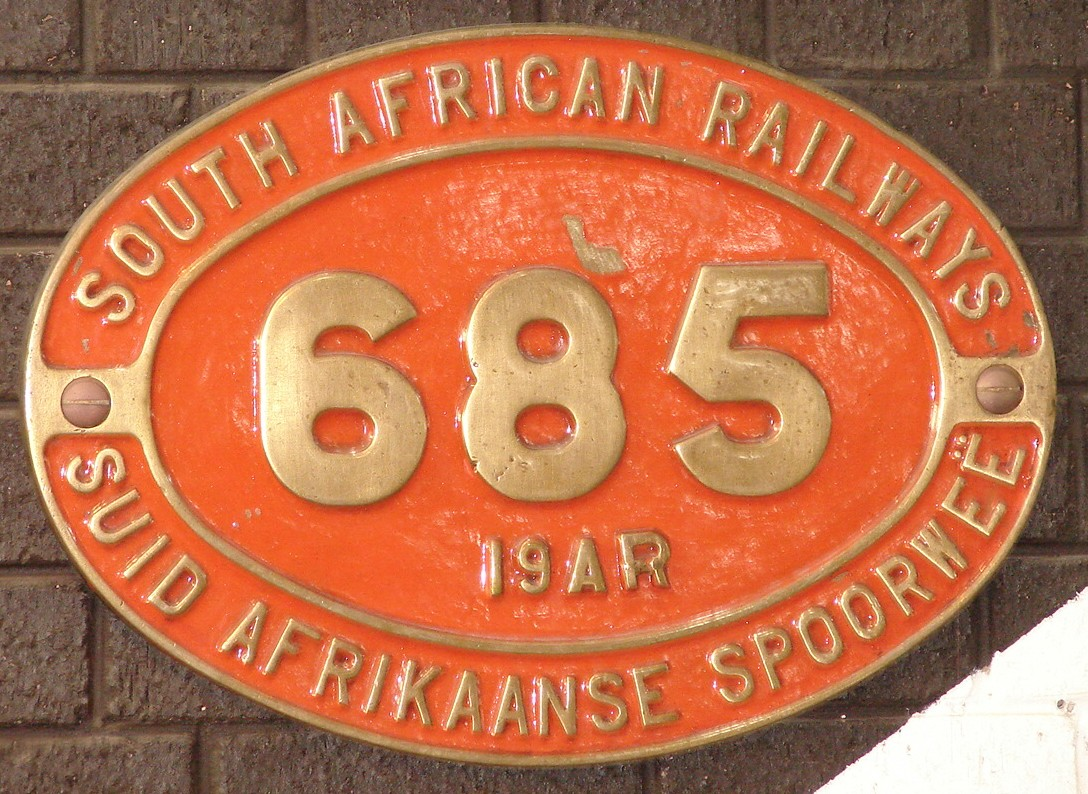

The number plate of no. 685, depicted alongside as it is displayed in the Outeniqua Transport Museum in George, is incorrectly inscribed "19AR" since that locomotive was retired without being reboilered with a Watson Standard boiler. The engine was photographed, still with its original boiler, as late as April 1970, fifteen years into electrification and dieselisation of the SAR and with steam traction already largely relegated to shunting and pickup work.

Similarly, the picture of the Class 19A rusting at Queenstown, shown below with the number 693 hand-painted on the cabside, is actually of Class 19A no. 685. It still has an as-delivered boiler while no. 693 was reboilered with a domeless Class 19D boiler. Both locomotives had been set aside by the Transnet Heritage Foundation for preservation, with no. 685 staged at Queenstown and no. 693 at Millsite in Krugersdorp, but each somehow had the other's number painted on their cabsides after their number plates were removed.

=== Industrial ===
After being retired from SAR service, several of these locomotives were sold into a second career in industrial service.

- Numbers 678 and 683 went to Tweefontein United Collieries. No. 678 later went to Witbank Consolidated Collieries.
- No. 679 went to Apex Mines at Greenside, later to the Fluor for Sasol plant and eventually to Dunn's.
- Numbers 684 and 691 went to Gledhow Sugar Mill where they were named "Umvoti" and "Blythedale" respectively. No. 684 later went to Umgala Colliery.
- Numbers 689 and 707 went to Platberg Colliery.
- No. 710 went to Butakon Limited, then to Southern Cross Steel Company in Middelburg, Transvaal, and eventually to Umgala Colliery at Utrecht in Natal.

== Preservation ==
Number	Works nmr	THF / Private	Leaselend / Owner	Current Location	Outside South Africa	?
679	SWISS 3304	THF		Witbank Locomotive Depot		
685	SWISS 3310	THF		Krugersdorp Locomotive Depot		
692	SWISS 3317	Private	Municipality	Sterkstroom (Town Centre)		
693	SWISS 3318	THF		Queenstown Locomotive Depot		19Ar (reboilered)(Standard 1A boiler)
696	SWISS 3321	THF	Natal Railway Museum	Hillton Station		19Ar (reboilered)(Domeless 19D boiler)

== Illustration ==
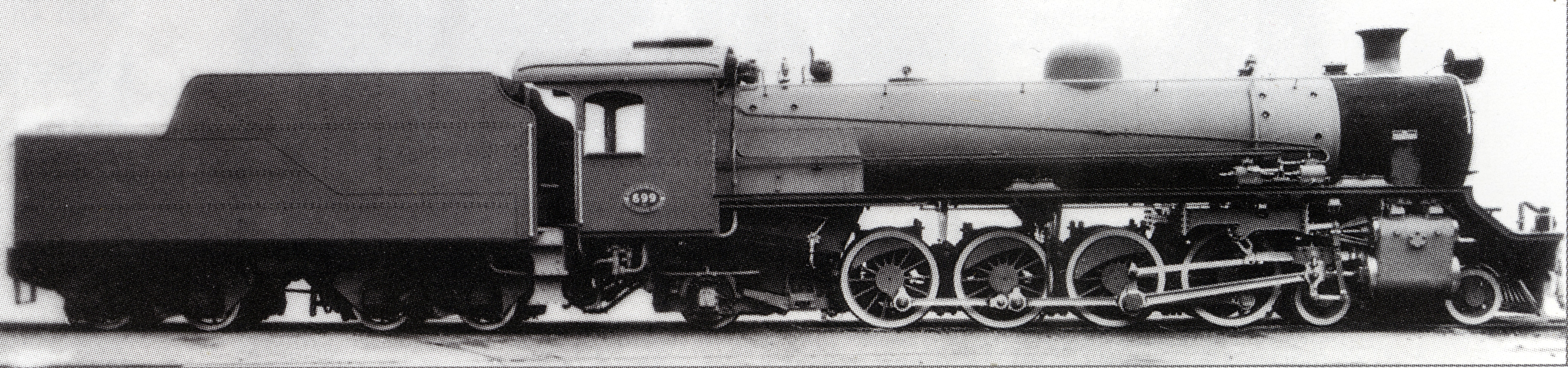
Works picture of no. 699, c. 1929

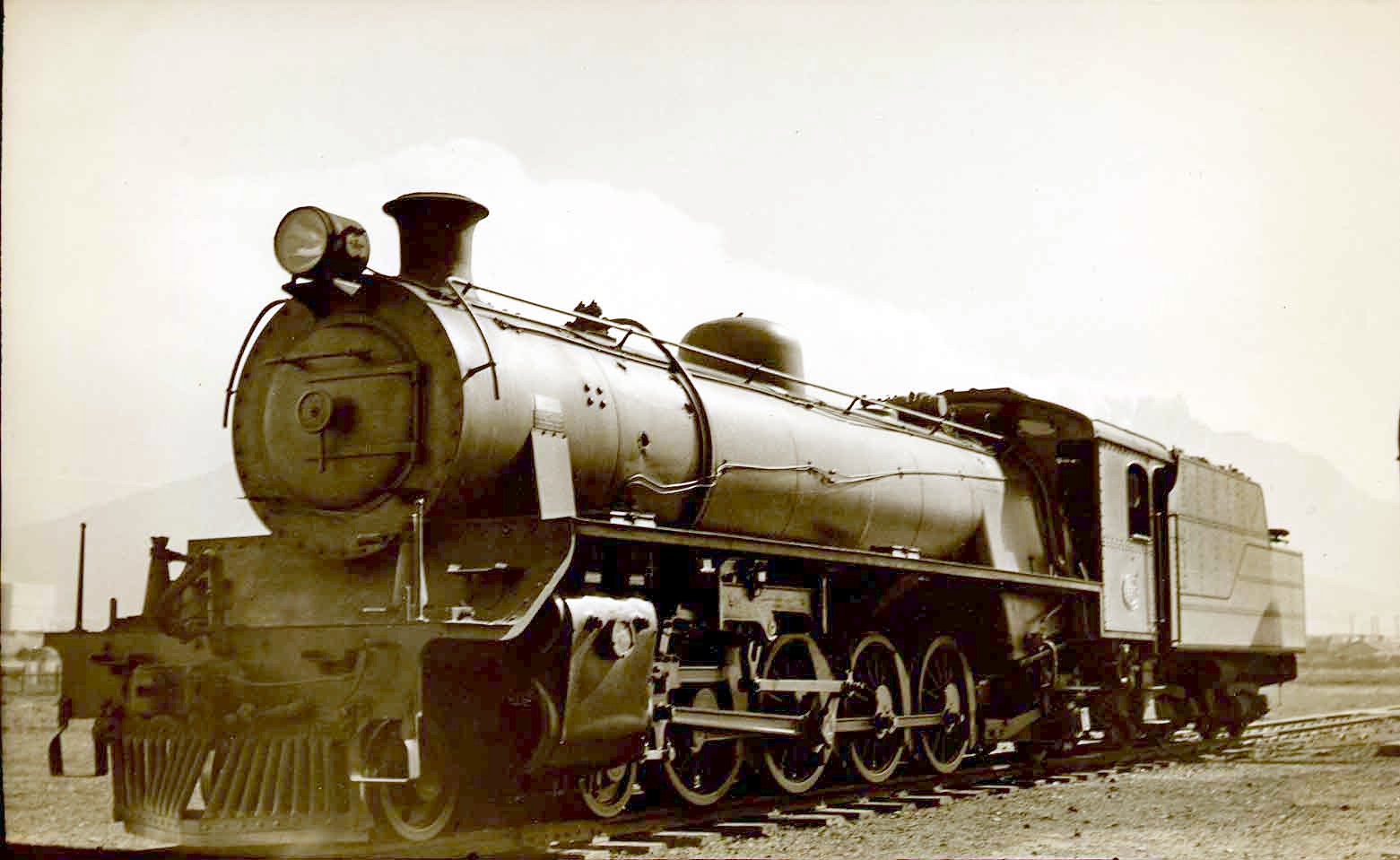
A Class 19A locomotive shortly after entering service, at Paardeneiland in Cape Town, c. 1930

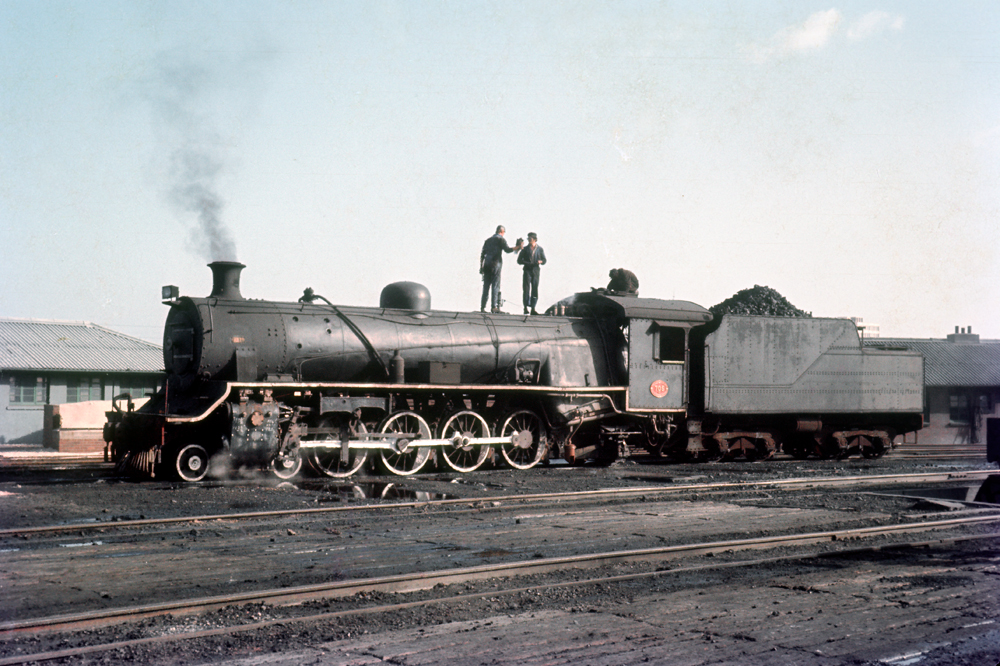
Class 19A no. 705 at the East London Locoshed in Cambridge, still with its original boiler, 16 April 1970

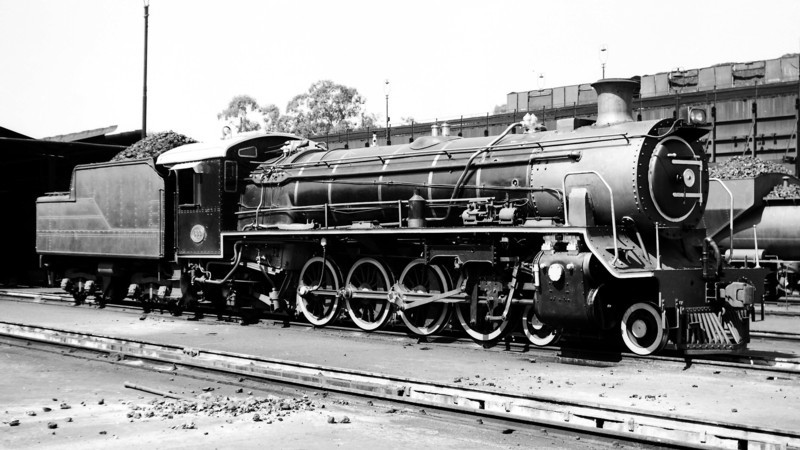
Class 19AR no. 693, reboilered with a domeless Watson Standard boiler from a first-batch Class 19D, Queenstown, 5 October 1969

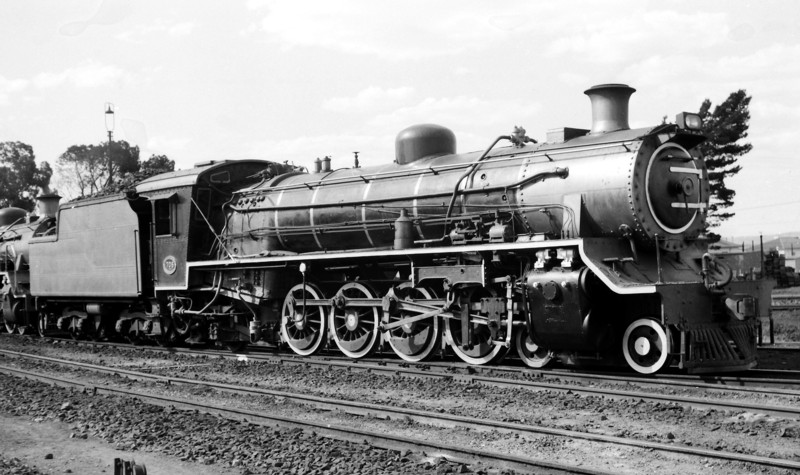
Class 19AR no. 706 at Rosmead, reboilered with a Watson Standard boiler, 20 December 1969
