= South African Class 15C 4-8-2 =

1925 design of steam locomotive

South African Class 15C (15CB) 4-8-2
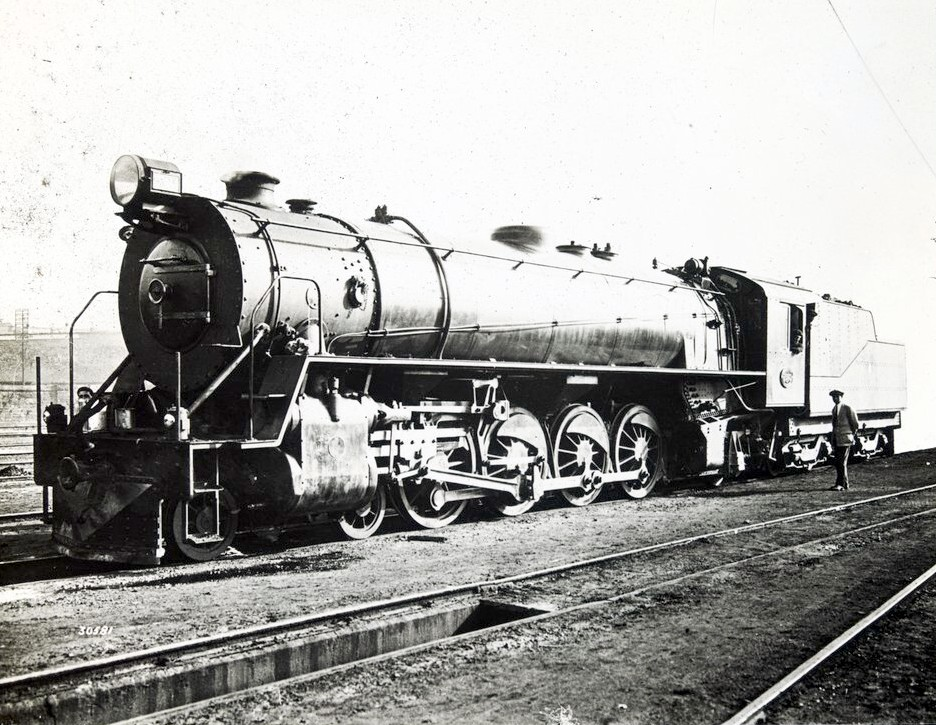
- Class 15C Big Bill as delivered, c. 1925
Type and origin
- ♠ With 57 inch (1,448 mm) coupled wheels ♥ With 60 inch (1,524 mm) coupled wheels ♣ Copper firebox - ♦ Steel firebox - ʘ Reboilered ʘ 23x28 Cylinders - ʘ 24x28 Cylinders
- Power type: Steam
- Designer: Baldwin Locomotive Works
- Builder: Baldwin Locomotive Works
- Serial number: 58307, 58308, 58708-58717
- Model: Class 15C
- Build date: 1925-1926
- Total produced: 12
Specifications
- Configuration
  - Whyte: 4-8-2 (Mountain)
  - UIC: 2'D1'h2
- Driver: 2nd coupled axle
- Gauge: 3 ft 6 in (1,067 mm) Cape gauge
- Leading dia.: 30 in (762 mm)
- Coupled dia.: ♠ 57 in (1,448 mm) ♥ 60 in (1,524 mm)
- Trailing dia.: 33 in (838 mm)
- Tender wheels: 34 in (864 mm)
- Wheelbase: 65 ft 3 1/4 in (19,895 mm)
  - Engine: 35 ft 8 in (10,871 mm)
  - Leading: 6 ft 10 in (2,083 mm)
  - Coupled: 15 ft 9 in (4,801 mm)
  - Tender: 20 ft 5 in (6,223 mm)
  - Tender bogie: 6 ft 2 in (1,880 mm)
- Length
  - Over couplers: 73 ft 2 1/4 in (22,308 mm)
- Height: ♠ 12 ft 10 in (3,912 mm) ♥ 12 ft 11 1/2 in (3,950 mm)
- Frame type: Bar
- Axle load: ♠♣ 17 LT 13 cwt (17,930 kg) ♠♦ 17 LT 2 cwt (17,370 kg) ♥♣ 17 LT 19 cwt (18,240 kg) ♥♦ 17 LT 8 cwt (17,680 kg)
  - Leading: ♠♣ 18 LT 3 cwt (18,440 kg) ♠♦ 19 LT 5 cwt (19,560 kg) ♥♣ 18 LT 3 cwt (18,440 kg) ♥♦ 19 LT 5 cwt (19,560 kg)
  - 1st coupled: ♠♣ 17 LT 13 cwt (17,930 kg) ♠♦ 17 LT 1 cwt (17,320 kg) ♥♣ 17 LT 16 cwt (18,090 kg) ♥♦ 17 LT 4 cwt (17,480 kg)
  - 2nd coupled: ♠♣ 17 LT 12 cwt (17,880 kg) ♠♦ 17 LT 2 cwt (17,370 kg) ♥♣ 17 LT 18 cwt (18,190 kg) ♥♦ 17 LT 8 cwt (17,680 kg)
  - 3rd coupled: ♠♣ 17 LT 13 cwt (17,930 kg) ♠♦ 17 LT 2 cwt (17,370 kg) ♥♣ 17 LT 19 cwt (18,240 kg) ♥♦ 17 LT 8 cwt (17,680 kg)
  - 4th coupled: ♠♣ 17 LT 9 cwt (17,730 kg) ♠♦ 16 LT 18 cwt (17,170 kg) ♥♣ 17 LT 15 cwt (18,030 kg) ♥♦ 17 LT 4 cwt (17,480 kg)
  - Trailing: ♠♣ 16 LT 6 cwt (16,560 kg) ♠♦ 15 LT 19 cwt (16,210 kg) ♥♣ 16 LT 6 cwt (16,560 kg) ♥♦ 15 LT 19 cwt (16,210 kg)
  - Tender bogie: Bogie 1: 33 LT 18 cwt (34,440 kg); Bogie 2: 35 LT 10 cwt (36,070 kg)
  - Tender axle: 17 LT 15 cwt (18,030 kg)
- Adhesive weight: ♠♣ 70 LT 7 cwt (71,480 kg) ♠♦ 68 LT 3 cwt (69,240 kg) ♥♣ 71 LT 8 cwt (72,550 kg) ♥♦ 69 LT 4 cwt (70,310 kg)
- Loco weight: ♠♣ 104 LT 16 cwt (106,500 kg) ♠♦ 103 LT 7 cwt (105,000 kg) ♥♣ 105 LT 17 cwt (107,500 kg) ♥♦ 104 LT 8 cwt (106,100 kg)
- Tender weight: 69 LT 8 cwt (70,510 kg)
- Total weight: ♠♣ 174 LT 4 cwt (177,000 kg) ♠♦ 172 LT 15 cwt (175,500 kg) ♥♣ 175 LT 5 cwt (178,100 kg) ♥♦ 173 LT 16 cwt (176,600 kg)
- Tender type: KT (2-axle bogies)
- Fuel type: Coal
- Fuel capacity: 14 LT (14.2 t)
- Water cap.: 6,000 imp gal (27,300 L)
- Firebox
  - Type: Round-top, combustion chamber
  - Grate area: 48 sq ft (4.5 m^{2})
- Boiler
  - Pitch: ♠ 8 ft 6 in (2,591 mm) ♥ 8 ft 7 1/2 in (2,629 mm)
  - Diameter: 6 ft 2 1/4 in (1,886 mm)
  - Tube plates: 20 ft 1/2 in (6,109 mm)
  - Small tubes: ♠ 143: 2 1/4 in (57 mm) ʘ 117: 2 1/4 in (57 mm)
  - Large tubes: ♠ 30: 5 1/2 in (140 mm) ʘ 34: 5 1/2 in (140 mm)
- Boiler pressure: ♠ 200 psi (1,379 kPa) ♥ 210 psi (1,448 kPa)
- Safety valve: Coale Pop
- Heating surface
  - Firebox: 200 sq ft (19 m^{2})
  - Tubes: ♠ 2,554 sq ft (237.3 m^{2}) ʘ 2,361 sq ft (219.3 m^{2})
  - Arch tubes: 23 sq ft (2.1 m^{2})
  - Total surface: ♠ 2,777 sq ft (258.0 m^{2}) ʘ 2,584 sq ft (240.1 m^{2})
- Superheater
  - Type: Schmidt
  - Heating area: ♠ 716 sq ft (66.5 m^{2}) ʘ 670 sq ft (62 m^{2})
- Cylinders: Two
- Cylinder size: ʘ 23 in (584 mm) bore ʘ 24 in (610 mm) bore ʘʘ 28 in (711 mm) stroke
- Valve gear: Walschaerts
- Valve type: Piston
- Couplers: Johnston link-and-pin AAR knuckle (1930s)
Performance figures
- Power output: ♠ʘ 38,980 lbf (173.4 kN) @ 75% ♠ʘ 42,440 lbf (188.8 kN) @ 75% ♥ʘ 38,880 lbf (172.9 kN) @ 75% ♥ʘ 42,340 lbf (188.3 kN) @ 75%
Career
- Operators: South African Railways
- Class: Class 15C, 15CB
- Number in class: 12
- Numbers: 2060–2071
- Nicknames: Big Bill
- Delivered: 1925-1926
- First run: 1925
- Withdrawn: 1976
- ♠ The leading coupled axle had flangeless wheels

The South African Railways Class 15C 4-8-2 of 1925 was a steam locomotive.

In 1925, the South African Railways placed two American-built Class 15C steam locomotives with a 4-8-2 Mountain type wheel arrangement in service. Another ten locomotives were ordered and delivered a year later. In 1926, these locomotives were reclassified to Class 15CB.

== Manufacturer ==
On 15 December 1924, following an official tour of investigation to the United States of America by G.E. Titren, the Superintendent Motive Power of the South African Railways (SAR), an order was placed with the Baldwin Locomotive Works (BLW) of Philadelphia for four experimental locomotives, two of which were of a 4-8-2 Mountain type wheel arrangement. These locomotives, both types specially designed for the long runs of the Union Limited (Johannesburg to Cape Town) and Union Express (Cape Town to Johannesburg) passenger trains, were delivered in 1925.

== Characteristics ==
These locomotives conformed to SAR requirements as far as practicable, but also incorporated the latest American railway engineering practices. They introduced several features which were new to the SAR at the time, such as top feeds to the boiler, self-cleaning smokeboxes, Sellar's drifting valves, and grease lubrication to the coupled wheel axleboxes, crank pins and connecting rod big ends. Their fireboxes were equipped with flexible side stays and water siphon arch tubes to support the brick arch and to improve circulation. Their Type KT tenders, arranged with self-trimming type coal bunkers, had a coal capacity of 14 long tons (14.2 tonnes) and a water capacity of 6,000 imperial gallons (27,300 litres), which was considered sufficient for the engines to travel 100 miles (161 kilometres) without having to replenish water.

The locomotives represented a considerable advance in power over the Classes 15, 15A and 15B. They had 5 inches (127 millimetres) thick bar frames and their boilers were larger in proportions than that of any existing SAR locomotive, while their boiler pitch was raised 10 inches (254 millimetres) higher than that of anything else in service at that time. The boilers were equipped with three Coale pop type safety valves and a Schmidt type superheater. To reduce the length between boiler tube plates, a 2 feet 3 inches (686 millimetres) long combustion chamber was provided in the firebox. The locomotive's size quickly earned it the nickname Big Bill, while its contemporary Class 16D 4-6-2 Pacific type which arrived from the same builders in the same shipment was nicknamed Big Bertha.

The first two locomotives, designated Class 15C with engine numbers 2060 and 2061, were erected at the Salt River shops and put to work on the line from Cape Town to Touws River. They performed well, were comparatively trouble-free and were good steamers capable of handling a heavy load exceeding that of any other locomotive which had been employed on this section to date.

Because of the good results obtained from these two engines, an order was placed with Baldwin for another ten locomotives which were delivered in 1926, numbered in the range from 2062 to 2071. All these locomotives were delivered new with copper fireboxes, but once sufficient water treatment facilities were available to prevent problems with corrosion, these were gradually replaced with steel fireboxes as and when firebox replacement became necessary.

== Reclassification ==
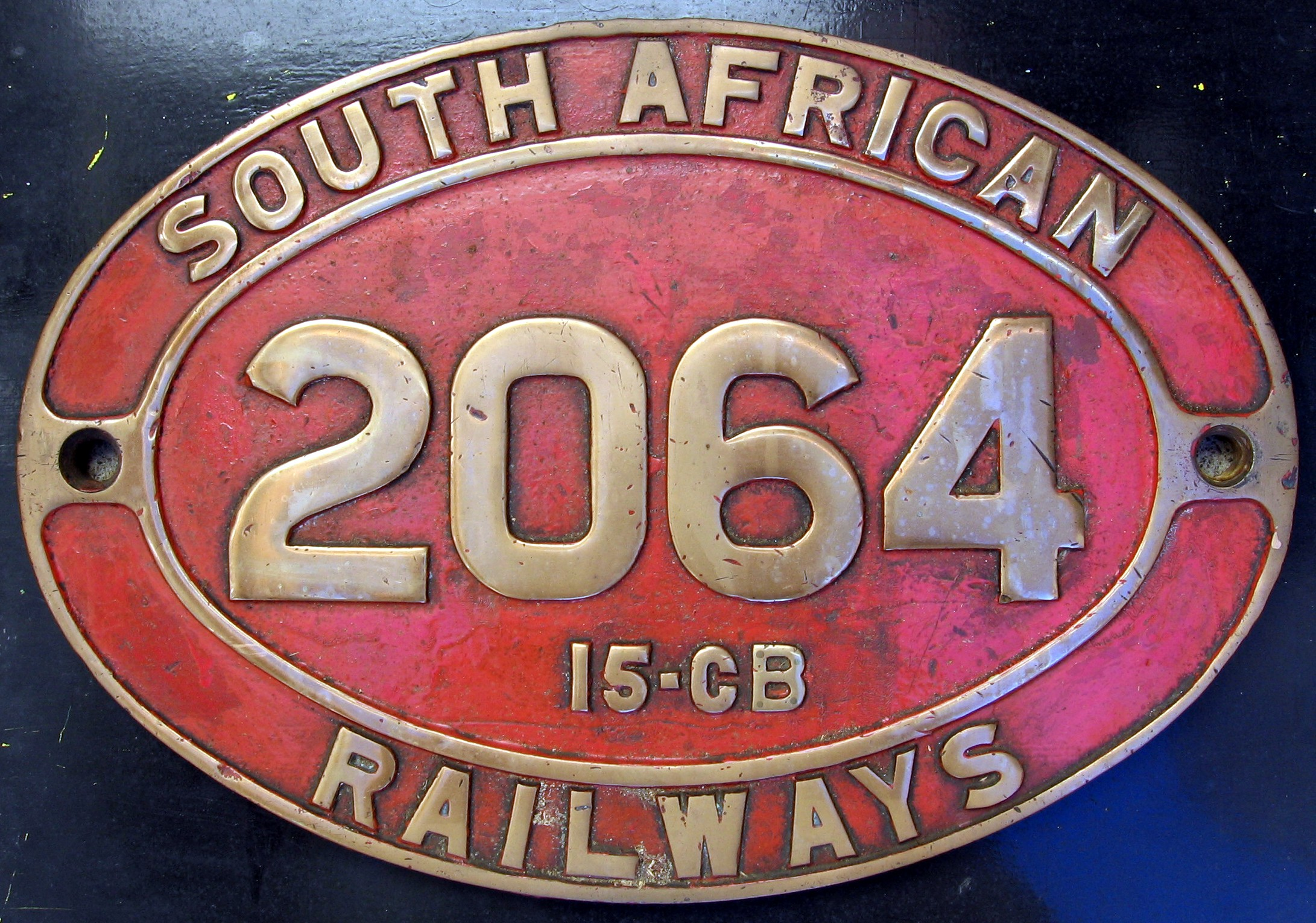

Shortly after being placed in service, the Class 15C's frames began to show evidence of cracking. A similar locomotive which differed mainly in the design of the frame under the firebox was then ordered from the American Locomotive Company (ALCO). When the 23 ALCO-built locomotives were placed in service in 1926 they were designated Class 15CA, with the "A" supposedly indicating the manufacturer ALCO rather than, as was usual SAR practice, a different version of an existing locomotive type.

The Class 15C was then, rather unnecessarily, reclassified to Class 15CB, with the "B" merely to indicate the manufacturer Baldwin and not, as was usual practice, a branchline locomotive.

== Modifications ==
=== Retyring ===
They were delivered with 57 inches (1,450 millimetres) diameter coupled wheels and their boiler safety valves were set at an operating pressure of 200 pounds per square inch (1,380 kilopascals). All twelve engines eventually had their coupled wheels retyred to 60 inches (1,520 millimetres) diameter and, to compensate for the loss of tractive effort due to the larger diameter wheels, their operating boiler pressure was increased to 210 pounds per square inch (1,450 kilopascals) by an adjustment of the setting of their safety valves. This modification enabled these mixed traffic locomotives to handle the fastest mainline passenger trains. Probably at the same time, their cylinders were reamed from a bore of 23 to 24 inches (584 to 610 millimetres).

When larger tyres were fitted, the old tyres were left in position and turned down on the wheel centres to serve as liners and the new tyres were then shrunk on over the liners. The practice of increasing the diameter of coupled wheels, wheel spacing and other considerations permitting, was begun by A.G. Watson during his term in office as Chief Mechanical Engineer (CME) and was continued by his successors. The reduction of tractive effort caused by the larger wheels was made up by increasing boiler pressures or by fitting larger cylinders or both, as required. This practice resulted in more mileage between heavy repairs, less cost-per-mile on repairs and locomotives capable of higher speeds.

=== Reboilering ===
Three of the Class 15CB and Class 15CA locomotives were reboilered during the early 1940s with new boilers numbered in the range from 9504 to 9506. These boilers were of similar dimensions to the originals but with a different tube arrangement, and were designed by Dr. M.M. Loubser, CME at the time. The reboilered locomotives were not reclassified.

== Service ==
=== South African Railways ===
The locomotives gave good service and were justifiably popular with traffic, running and engineering staff alike. The introduction of these large engines along with their Class 16D Pacific type Big Bertha siblings resulted in a complete revision of traffic operation between Cape Town and Johannesburg. The Pacifics were scheduled to work the 616 miles (991 kilometres) stretch between Johannesburg and Beaufort West, while the Big Bill Mountains entered service on the 340 miles (547 kilometres) stretch from Beaufort West to Cape Town with its ruling gradient of 1 in 40 (2½%) and severe curvature for approximately 22 miles (35 kilometres) on the Hex River Railpass section between Touws River and De Doorns.

They were later transferred to Bloemfontein, from where they worked south to Noupoort. Following electrification of the Eastern Transvaal mainline in the mid-1960s, commencing in December 1964 all twelve Class 15CBs were transferred to Greyville on the Natal System from where they were used on, amongst others, the night and day passenger trains to and from Empangeni on the North Coast line and on passenger trains to and from Kelso on the South Coast line. They were eventually evenly distributed between the Greyville, Stanger and Empangeni sheds. After their Natal service, they spent the rest of their SAR working lives in the Eastern and Western Transvaal. They were withdrawn from SAR service in 1976.

=== Industrial ===
Eleven Class 15CB locomotives were sold into industrial service in 1976, with only the first-built, no. 2060, being retained by the SAR for preservation. By the late 1980s at more than 60 years of age, eleven of the original twelve Class 15CB locomotives were still at work.

- Numbers 2061, 2065 and 2070 became South Witbank Coal Mine's numbers 3, 2 and 1 respectively.
- Numbers 2062 and 2067 went to Tweefontein United Collieries.
- Numbers 2063 and 2064 went to Dunn's Locomotive Works to be employed at Durban Navigation Collieries (Durnacol) in Natal. No. 2063 was subsequently resold to Rustenburg Platinum Mines, becoming their no. 5, and no. 2064 was resold to Tavistock Colliery, becoming their no. 3.
- Numbers 2066 and 2068 went to Tavistock Colliery, becoming their numbers 4 and 5 respectively.
- Numbers 2069 and 2071 went to Rustenburg Platinum Mines, becoming their numbers 3 and 4 respectively.

== Preservation ==
| Number | Works nmr | THF / Private | Leaselend / Owner | Current Location | Outside South Africa | ? |
|---|---|---|---|---|---|---|
| 2060 | BALDWIN 58307 | Private | MISLPT (Michael Barclay) | Krugersdorp Locomotive Depot | | |
| 2071 | BALDWIN 58717 | Private | Sandstone Heritage Trust | Sandstone Estate | | |

== Illustration ==
The main picture shows a Class 15C as delivered in 1925, while the following show two Class 15CB locomotives in industrial service after withdrawal from SAR service.

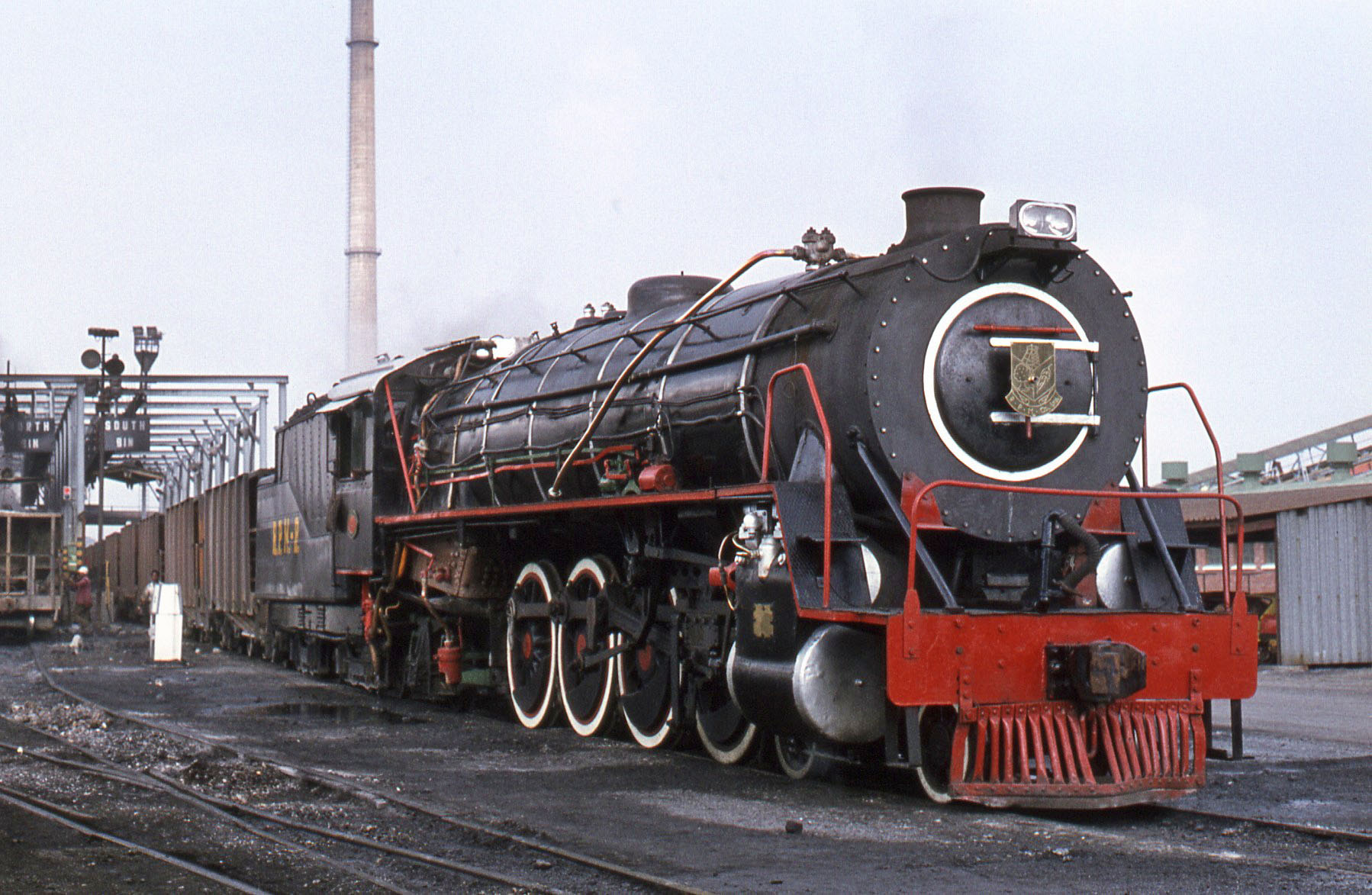
No. 2071 as Rusplats no. 4, Rustenburg, 31 March 1983

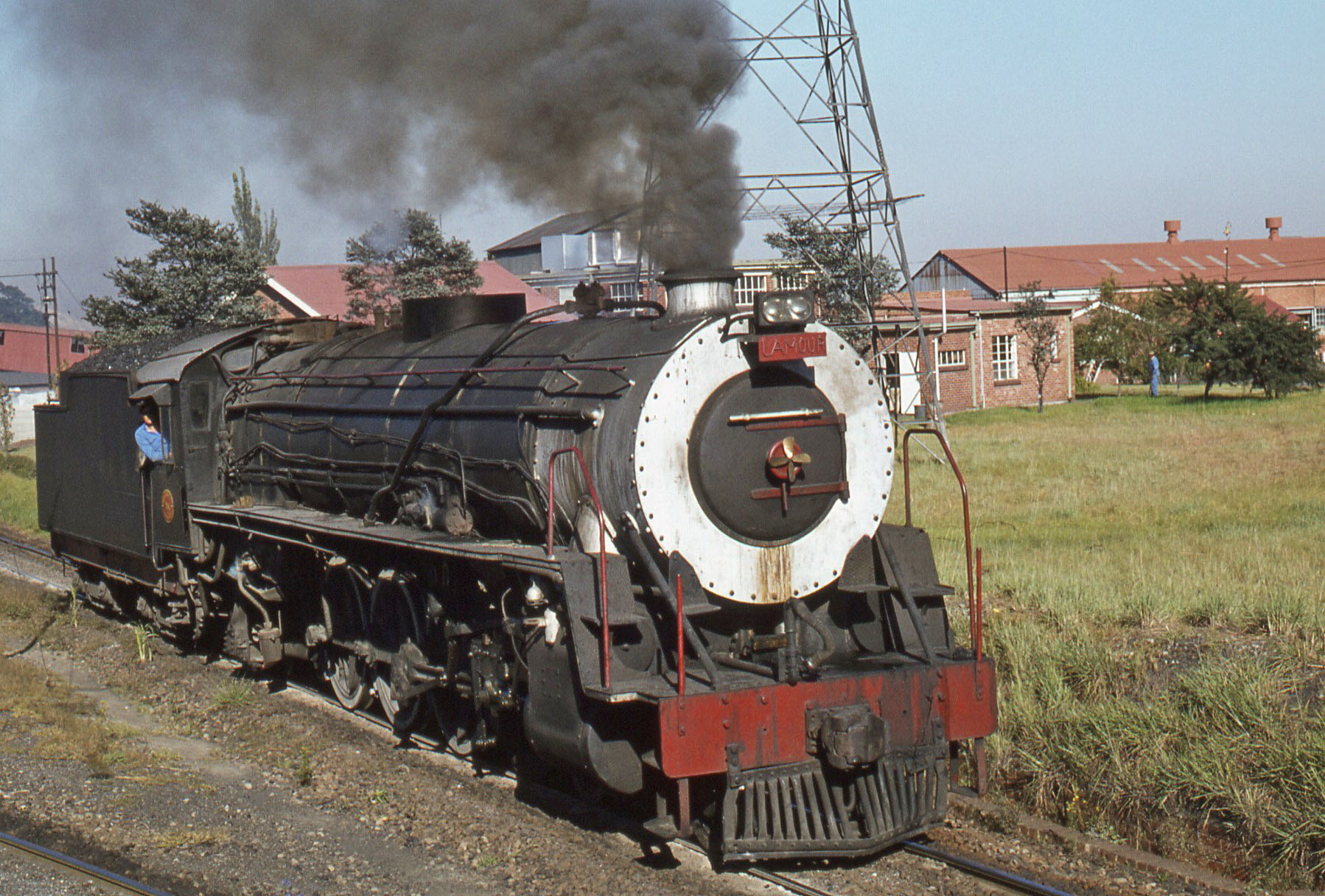
No. 2064 at Durnacol, Dannhauser, Natal, 11 April 1979
