= Ishwar Ramlutchman =

South African philanthropist and community leader

Prince Ishwar "Mabheka Zulu" Ramlutchman
- Mabheka Zulu
- Born: February 8, 1976 (age 50); KwaZulu-Natal, South Africa
- Other name: Mabheka Zulu
- Occupations: Businessman; Philanthropist; Cultural ambassador
- Known for: Community upliftment, inter-faith peace initiatives, association with Zulu Royal Household
- Website: https://www.ishwarramlutchman.co.za/

Ishwar Ramlutchman (born 8 February 1976), also known as Mabheka Zulu, is a South African businessman, philanthropist and cultural/community leader. He is known for his work in disadvantaged and rural KwaZulu-Natal communities, his association with the Zulu royal household, and his efforts in promoting inter-faith unity and heritage preservation.

== Early life and education ==
Ramlutchman was born in Kwa-Dukuza (formerly Stanger), KwaZulu-Natal, on 8 February 1976, the third of seven children born to Chintha and Ramlutchman Kissoon. His father earned approximately R25 per week and his mother did laundry and garden work to provide for the family. His father died when Ramlutchman was still in matric, and due to financial constraints he did not attend tertiary education and instead entered the workforce immediately.

== Business career ==
In 1994 Ramlutchman began work at Tony Motor Spares in Mtubatuba and in 1995 at Pipetec in Empangeni. After being retrenched in 1998 and following spiritual reflection, he founded AC Industrial (later AC Industrial Sales & Services) on 1 June 1998, an independent privately owned infrastructure services company (notably water and sanitation) operating in KwaZulu-Natal.

== Philanthropy and community work ==
Ramlutchman has been active in community-upliftment initiatives, focusing on housing for under-privileged families, feeding programmes, tree-planting campaigns, and improving water and sanitation services in rural areas. He is President of the Sivananda World Peace Foundation and has led the “Peace Pillars” initiative—erecting inscribed granite pillars representing prayers from major world religions to foster unity. He also participated in the annual barefoot pilgrimage of the Nazareth Baptist Church (Shembe) covering over 70 km to promote social cohesion.

== Association with the Zulu Royal Household ==
Ramlutchman was formally adopted by the late Goodwill Zwelithini, King of the Zulu, and given the Zulu name “Mabheka Zulu”, meaning “the one who cares for my people”. The King described him as “indodana yethu (our son)”. He was also honoured with Zulu Royal Orders and inducted into the Izinyosi Zulu regiment.

== Honours and recognition ==
Ramlutchman has received numerous awards and honours, including a triple honorary degree in 2020: an honorary doctorate in humanitarianism & conflict resolution, an honorary Master’s in Christian Religious Studies, and an honorary professorship in humanitarianism & community development from the Los Angeles Development Church & Institute.
