= Empangeni =

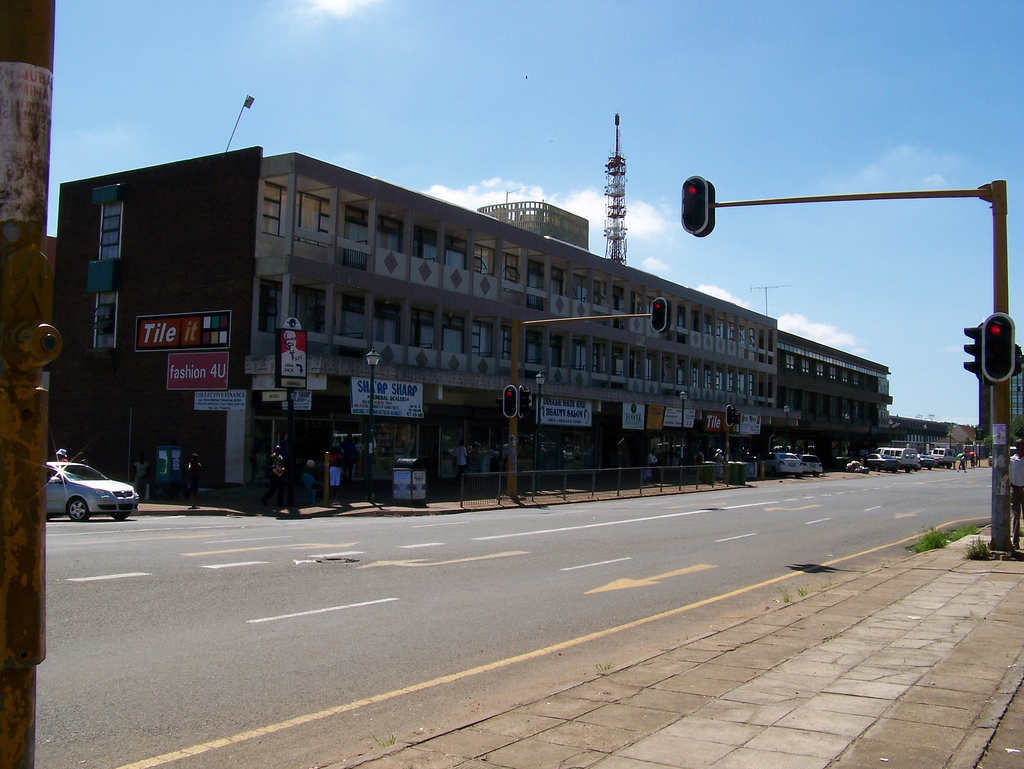
- Street in Empangeni

- Location within KwaZulu-Natal Location within South Africa
- Coordinates: 28°45′S 31°54′E
- Country: South Africa
- Province: KwaZulu-Natal
- District: King Cetshwayo
- Municipality: uMhlathuze

Area
  - Total: 154.47 km^{2} (59.64 sq mi)

Population (2022)
  - Total: 110,340
  - Density: 714.31/km^{2} (1,850.1/sq mi)

Racial makeup (2022)
  - Black African: 61.3%
  - White: 31.9%
  - Indian/Asian: 5.7%
  - Coloured: 2.8%
  - Other: 0.2%

First languages (2022)
  - Zulu: 64.5%
  - English: 22.9%
  - Afrikaans: 18.6%
  - S. Ndebele: 1.3%
  - Other: 2.7%
- Time zone: UTC+2 (SAST)
- Postal code (street): 3880
- PO box: 3880
- Area code: 035

Empangeni is a town in KwaZulu-Natal, South Africa. It is approximately 157 kilometres north of Durban, in hilly countryside, overlooking a flat coastal plain and the major harbour town of Richards Bay 16 kilometres away. The N2 freeway runs east from Empangeni intersecting John Ross Highway (R34) which connects Empangeni and Richards Bay.

The climate is sub-tropical with an average temperature of 28.4 °C in summer and 14.5 °C in Winter. The town is said, by local residents, to not have a real winter, as temperatures are seldom very low.

== History ==
=== Humble beginnings ===
In 1851, the Norwegian Missionary Society established a mission station on the banks of the eMpangeni river. The river was named after the profusion of Mpange trees (Trema guineensis) growing along its banks. The mission was later moved to Eshowe, 61 kilometres south-west. In 1894 a magistracy was established. The Zululand Railway reached the town in January 1903 and linked the area to Durban and Eshowe. The government planted eucalyptus trees in 1905 as part of an experimental timber plantation. The plantation was a success and led to large scale planting along the coastal belt. In 1906 Empangeni became a village. Rapid expansion began when a sugar mill was erected at Felixton. The establishment of the Empangeni Sugar Mill set the area on the road to rapid development. Empangeni was officially proclaimed as a township on 15 January 1931 and declared a borough on 13 October 1960 and A. Boza became its first official mayor.

=== The reign of the Hammerman ===
A small town, Empangeni made the headlines in the early 1980s for a very unfortunate reason. Serial killer Simon Mpungose was terrorising the citizens of Empangeni during his spree of violent murders. The 35-year-old Mpungose was given the name ‘Hammerman’ because he would break into homes in the dead of night and kill the occupants with a hammer before robbing them of their possessions. When he was brought to trial in November 1984, shortly after his arrest that same year, the Empangeni court was told that Mpungose attacked many other people during violent robberies, but never touched the children of his victims. During the trial Mpungose stated that he wanted to die as he had a hard life, complicated by the actions of people who did not understand his plight.

He was sentenced to hang, whereupon Mpungose threw his blue tracksuit into the public gallery, shouted, and threatened to expose his penis to the court before he was restrained with handcuffs. He was hanged a year later on Friday, 29 November 1985 in Pretoria.

=== The Riots of 2021 ===
Empangeni was one of the town severely damaged during the riots and subsequent looting that broke out in parts of South Africa in July 2021. Many businesses did not reopen following the carnage. By 2024, most of the CBD has been repaired and rebuilt. Sanlam Centre which is a large shopping centre in the Empangeni CBD went through an extensive renovations in response to the damage caused by the riots and installed a fence along the perimeter of the centre's parking lot in case of future events similar to the 2021 riots.

=== Prince Buthelezi Mall ===
Construction of the shopping centre began on 3 December 2024 and lasted until its opening on 30 April 2026. The mall was named after Inkatha Freedom Party founder and anti-apartheid activist, Prince Mangosuthu Buthelezi. Over 100 000 people visited the mall in its opening weekend.

=== Mayors ===
- Achilles Boza, 1960 - 1967 (Ind)
- Cllr. Denny Moffatt, 2000 - 2006 (IFP)
- Cllr. Zakhele Mnqayi, 2006 - 2011 (ANC)
- Cllr. Elphas Mbatha, 2011 - 2015 (ANC)
- Cllr. Mduduzi Mhlongo, 2015 - 2021 (ANC)
- Cllr. Dr. Nkonzoyakhe Donda, 2021 - 2021 (IFP)
- Cllr. Xolani Ngwezi, 2021–present (IFP)

== Education ==
Empangeni has a number of respected schools.

=== High schools ===
- Empangeni High School {EHS}
- Mevamhlophe High School
- St Catherine's Empangeni
- Old Mill High School {OMS}
- Richem Secondary
- Felixton College
- Mgezeni Technical High School
- Mningi High School
- Khombindlela High School {KHS}
- Ehawini Technical High School
- Thanduyise High School
- Nongweleza High School
- Amangwe High School
- Matshana High School
- Dover Combined School

=== Primary schools ===
- Grantham Park
- Heuwelland
- Empangeni Preparatory School
- Empangeni Educare Centre
- Empangeni Christian School
- Phesheya Primary school
- Thembelihle Primary school
- Nqutshini Primary School
- Wood and Raw Primary School
- Siyakhanyisa Primary School
- Ngweni Primary School
- Darrut Tarbiyah Muslim School[DTMS]

== Religion ==
Empangeni is home to a number of faiths, including Christian, Muslim, and Jehovah's Witness. Christianity and the Nazareth Baptist church are the dominant faiths in Empangeni with a large number or operating church, amongst them are Christian Family Church, The Redeemed Christian Church of God, Empangeni Methodist Church, AGS Empangeni, Victory Family Church, Full Gospel Church, St Matthews Lutheran Church, Solid Ground Church, Empangeni Baptist Church, Uniting Reformed Church (Dutch), St Patrick's Roman Catholic Church, The Methodist Church, Holy Cross and St Thomas in Felixton

== Sports ==
Empangeni has a strong sporting community, most of whom participate in one or more of these sports:

- Golf
- Rugby
- Squash
- Pool
- Bowls
- Cricket
- Soccer
- Hockey

== Notable people ==
- Ishwar "Mabheka Zulu" Ramlutchman, Philanthropist
- Sandile Sithole, graphic designer
- Vincent Koch, 2 time Rugby World Cup winner
- Lunatik, musician
- Jessica Nkosi, actress
- Celeste Ntuli, comedian, presenter & actress
- Mildred Oliphant, politician
- J Sabali, musician
- Siyabonga Sangweni, footballer
- Ian Vermaak, tennis player
- Khyathi Kalyan, London-based lawyer and AI expert
- Muzi, musician
- Schalk Brits, Rugby World Cup winning hooker
- Matthew Mole, musician
- Saliwa, maskandi musician
- Mthandeni Mbambo, Actor
- Ntokozo 'Starring' Zulu, Poet
- Sandile Mthethwa, footballer

== Local media ==
- The Zululand Observer newspaper
- Icora FM community radio station
- Ikalamva Films
- Vibe Online

== Ngwelezane township ==
Ngwelezane is a township at the outskirts of Empangeni. The township is home to the Ngwelezane Hospital, a 554 beds institution and a tertiary hospital.

In 2020 Residents joined forces to form a Green committee called "The Green Champions" which consists of young energetic patriotic members of the community led by Siyamthanda Community Services. The Green Champions spearheads the greening of Ngwelezane Township through their weekly "Adopt A Spot" campaign, where they turn illegal dumping spots and bushy neglected spaces into Green Spaces.
