= South African type HT tender =

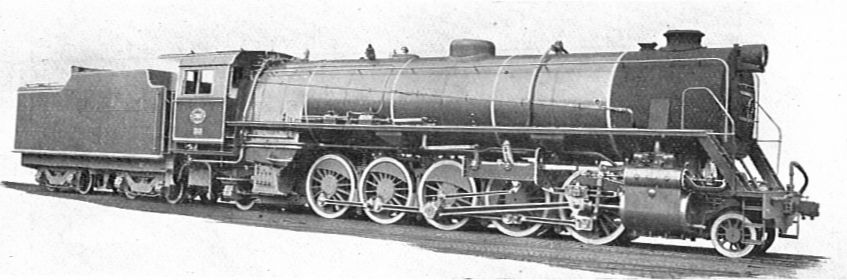
- Type HT tender on Class 18, c. 1927
Type and origin
- Locomotive: Class 18
- Designer: South African Railways (Col F.R. Collins DSO)
- Builder: Henschel and Son
- In service: 1927
- Rebuilder: South African Railways
- Rebuild date: c. 1950
- Rebuilt to: Type KT
Specifications
- Configuration: 2-axle bogies
- Gauge: 3 ft 6 in (1,067 mm) Cape gauge
- Length: 28 ft 4 in (8,636 mm)
- Wheel dia.: 34 in (864 mm)
- Wheelbase: 20 ft 5 in (6,223 mm)
  - Bogie: 6 ft 2 in (1,880 mm)
- Axle load: 19 LT 8 cwt (19,710 kg)
  - Front bogie: 33 LT 18 cwt (34,440 kg)
  - Rear bogie: 38 LT 16 cwt (39,420 kg)
- Weight empty: 71,488 lb (32,426 kg)
- Weight w/o: 72 LT 14 cwt (73,870 kg)
- Fuel type: Coal
- Fuel cap.: 14 LT (14.2 t)
- Water cap.: 6,000 imp gal (27,300 L)
- Stoking: Mechanical
- Couplers: Drawbar & AAR knuckle
Career
- Operators: South African Railways
- Numbers: SAR 1360-1361

The South African type HT tender was a steam locomotive tender.

Two Type HT tenders entered service in 1927 and 1928 as tenders to the two Class 18 2-10-2 Santa Fe type steam locomotives which were acquired by the South African Railways in those years.

== Manufacturer ==
The Type HT tenders were built in 1927 by Henschel and Son of Kassel in Germany.

The South African Railways (SAR) placed two Class 18 Santa Fe type locomotives in service in 1927 and 1928. The locomotives and tenders were built to the design of Col F.R. Collins DSO, Chief Mechanical Engineer of the SAR, and were placed in service on the line between Witbank and Germiston where increasingly heavy coal trains were overtaxing the hauling capacity of the non-articulated locomotive fleet. The Type HT entered service as tenders to these locomotives.

== Characteristics ==
The Type HT tender was arranged with a Duplex D.4 type mechanical stoker, operated by a four-cylinder steam engine. It had a coal capacity of 14 long tons (14.2 tonnes), a water capacity of 6,000 imperial gallons (27,300 litres) and a maximum axle load of 19 long tons 8 hundredweight (19,710 kilograms).

== Locomotive ==
Only the two Class 18 locomotives were delivered new with Type HT tenders, which were numbered 1360 and 1361 for their engines. An oval number plate, bearing the engine number and possibly also the tender type, was attached to the rear end of the tender.

== Classification letters ==
Since many tender types were interchangeable between different locomotive classes and types, a tender classification system was adopted by the SAR. The first letter of the tender type indicated the classes of engines to which it could be coupled. The "H_" tenders could only be used with the two Class 18 locomotives with which they were delivered.

The second letter indicated the tender's water capacity. The "_T" tenders had a capacity of between 5,587 and 6,000 imperial gallons (25,400 and 27,300 litres; 6,710 and 7,210 US gallons).

== Modification to Type KT ==
After their locomotives were withdrawn from service in the early 1950s, the two Type HT tenders had their mechanical stokers removed and their drawgear modified for use with Class 15CA locomotives. They were then redesignated Type KT. The "K_" tenders could be used with the locomotive classes as shown.

- Class 15CB.
- Class 15CA.
- Class 16D.
- Class 16DA of 1928 and 1930.

== Illustration ==
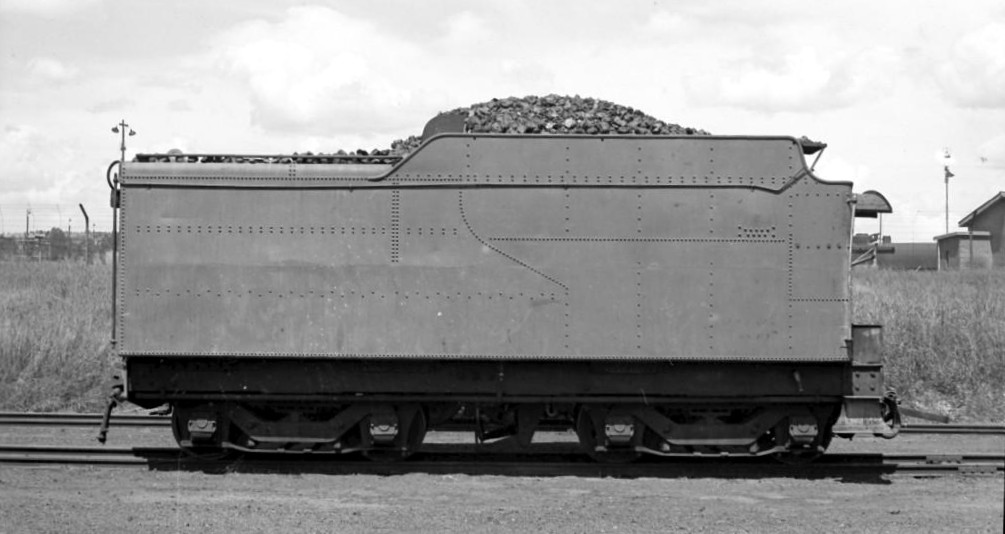
Ex Type HT tender, modified and redesignated Type KT, c. 1970
