= South African type KT tender =

Type of locomotive tender

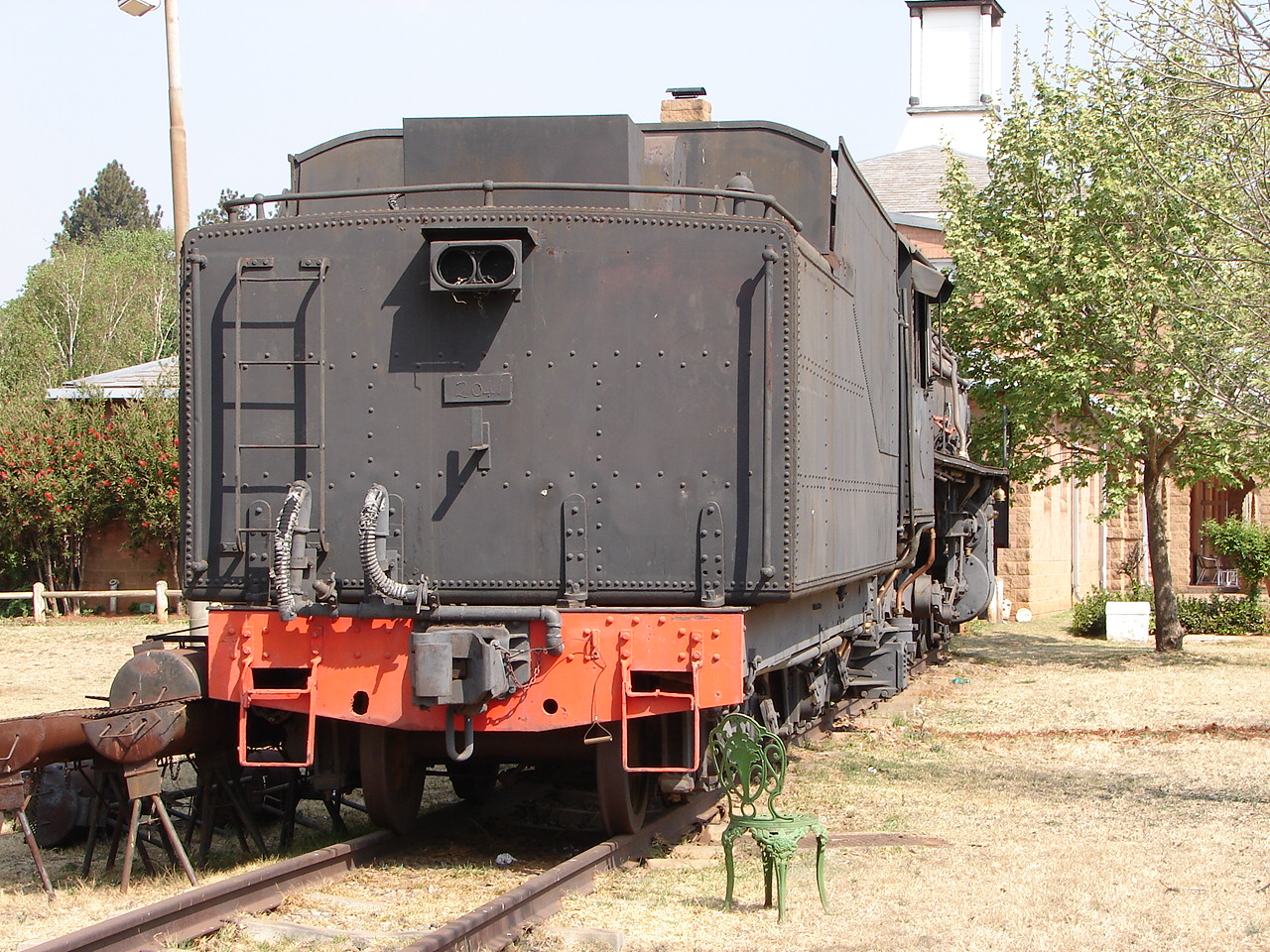
- Type KT tender no. 2041 on Class 15CA, 2009
Type and origin
- ♠ 12 long tons coal capacity ♥ 13 long tons coal capacity ♣ 14 long tons coal capacity
- Locomotive: Class 15C, Class 15CA, Class 16D, Class 16DA
- Designer: Baldwin Locomotive Works
- Builder: American Locomotive Company; Baldwin Locomotive Works; Henschel and Son; Hohenzollern Locomotive Works; Società Italiana Ernesto Breda; North British Locomotive Company
- In service: 1925-1930
- Rebuilt from: Type HT
- Rebuilder: South African Railways
- Rebuild date: c. 1950
Specifications
- Configuration: 2-axle bogies
- Gauge: 3 ft 6 in (1,067 mm) Cape gauge
- Length: 28 ft 8 1/4 in (8,744 mm)
- Wheel dia.: 34 in (864 mm)
- Wheelbase: 20 ft 5 in (6,223 mm)
  - Bogie: 6 ft 2 in (1,880 mm)
- Axle load: ♠ 16 LT 11 cwt (16,820 kg) ♥ 16 LT 17 cwt 2 qtr (17,150 kg) ♣ 17 LT 15 cwt (18,030 kg)
  - Front bogie: ♠ 32 LT 18 cwt (33,430 kg) ♥ 33 LT 10 cwt (34,040 kg) ♣ 33 LT 18 cwt (34,440 kg)
  - Rear bogie: ♠ 33 LT 2 cwt (33,630 kg) ♥ 33 LT 15 cwt (34,290 kg) ♣ 35 LT 10 cwt (36,070 kg)
- Weight empty: 68,888 lb (31,247 kg)
- Weight w/o: ♠ 66 LT (67,060 kg) ♥ 67 LT 5 cwt (68,330 kg) ♣ 69 LT 8 cwt (70,510 kg)
- Fuel type: Coal
- Fuel cap.: ♠ 12 LT (12.2 t) ♥ 13 LT (13.2 t) ♣ 14 LT (14.2 t)
- Water cap.: 6,000 imp gal (27,300 L)
- Stoking: Manual
- Couplers: Drawbar & Johnston link-and-pin Drawbar & AAR knuckle (1930s)
Career
- Operators: South African Railways
- Numbers: SAR 843-850, 860-866, 868-879, 2039–2077, 2801-2857; Ex Type HT 1360-1361

The South African type KT tender was a steam locomotive tender.

The Type KT tender first entered service in 1925, as tenders to the Class 15CB Big Bill 4-8-2 Mountain type and Class 16D Big Bertha 4-6-2 Pacific type steam locomotives which were acquired by the South African Railways in that year.

== Manufacturers ==
Type KT tenders were built between 1925 and 1930 by American Locomotive Company, Baldwin Locomotive Works, Henschel and Son, Hohenzollern Locomotive Works, Società Italiana Ernesto Breda and North British Locomotive Company.

The South African Railways (SAR) placed twelve Class 15C Mountain type locomotives (reclassified to Class 15CB in 1926) and seven Class 16D Pacific type locomotives in service in 1925 and 1926. The locomotives and tender were designed by Baldwin Locomotive Works of Philadelphia. The Classes 15C and 16D were acquired specifically for the long runs of the Union Limited (Johannesburg to Cape Town) and Union Express (Cape Town to Johannesburg) passenger trains. The Type KT first entered service as tenders to these two locomotive Classes.

== Characteristics ==
The tenders were arranged with self-trimming type coal bunkers and had a maximum coal capacity of 14 long tons (14.2 tonnes) and a maximum water capacity of 6,000 imperial gallons (27,300 litres), which was considered sufficient for the engines to travel 100 miles (161 kilometres) without having to replenish water.

The water capacity of the tenders were described in official SAR diagrams as "nominal", while three coal capacities of 12, 13 and 14 long tons (12.2, 13.2 and 14.2 tonnes) were shown. This appears to have been limitations for working on lines laid with lighter rail after the respective engines were withdrawn from mainline working, since the tenders were apparently not modified to reduce their capacities. The instruction was that water capacity (water taken) was to be reduced where necessary to ensure that the respective maximum axle loads of 16 long tons 11 hundredweight (16,820 kilograms), 16 long tons 17 hundredweight 2 quarters (17,150 kilograms) and 17 long tons 15 hundredweight (18,030 kilograms), as shown in the diagrams with the three given coal loads, were not exceeded.

== Locomotives ==
Five locomotive classes and models, built by six manufacturers, were delivered new with Type KT tenders, which were numbered for their engines in the number ranges as shown. An oval number plate, bearing the engine number and often also the tender type, was attached to the rear end of the tender. On some tenders, presumably after number plates went astray, the number was weld-written on the tender instead, as on the illustrated tender no. 2041.

- 1925: Class 15CB, numbers 2060 to 2071.
- 1925: Class 16D, numbers 860 to 866.
- 1926: Class 15CA, numbers 2039 to 2059, 2072 to 2077 and 2801 to 2857.
- 1928: Class 16DA of 1928, numbers 843 to 850 and 868 to 873.
- 1930: Class 16DA of 1930, numbers 874 to 879.

== Classification letters ==
Since many tender types are interchangeable between different locomotive classes and types, a tender classification system was adopted by the SAR. The first letter of the tender type indicates the classes of engines to which it can be coupled. The "K_" tenders could only be used with the four locomotive classes with which they were delivered.

The second letter indicates the tender's water capacity. The "_T" tenders had a capacity of between 5,587 and 6,000 imperial gallons (25,400 and 27,300 litres; 6,710 and 7,210 US gallons).

== Modified from Type HT ==
After their locomotives were withdrawn from service, the Type HT tenders of the two Class 18 2-10-2 Henschel Giants had their mechanical stokers removed and their drawgear modified for use with Class 15CA locomotives. These two tenders were then redesignated Type KT as well.

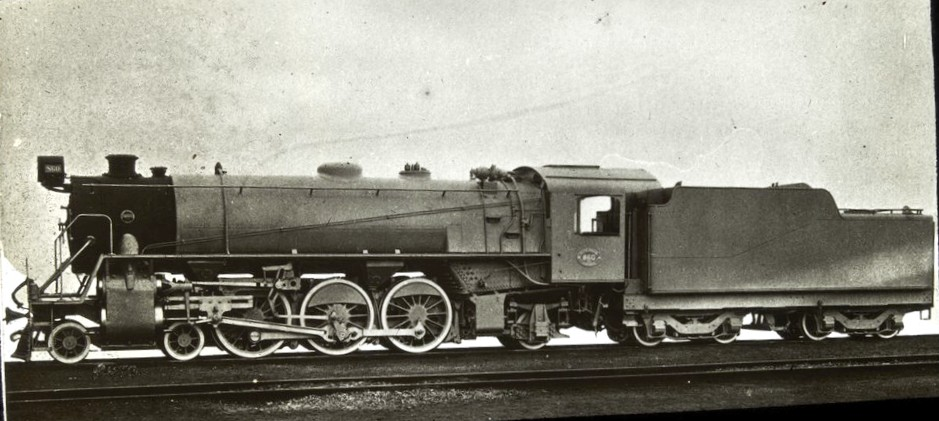
Type KT on Class 16D, c. 1925

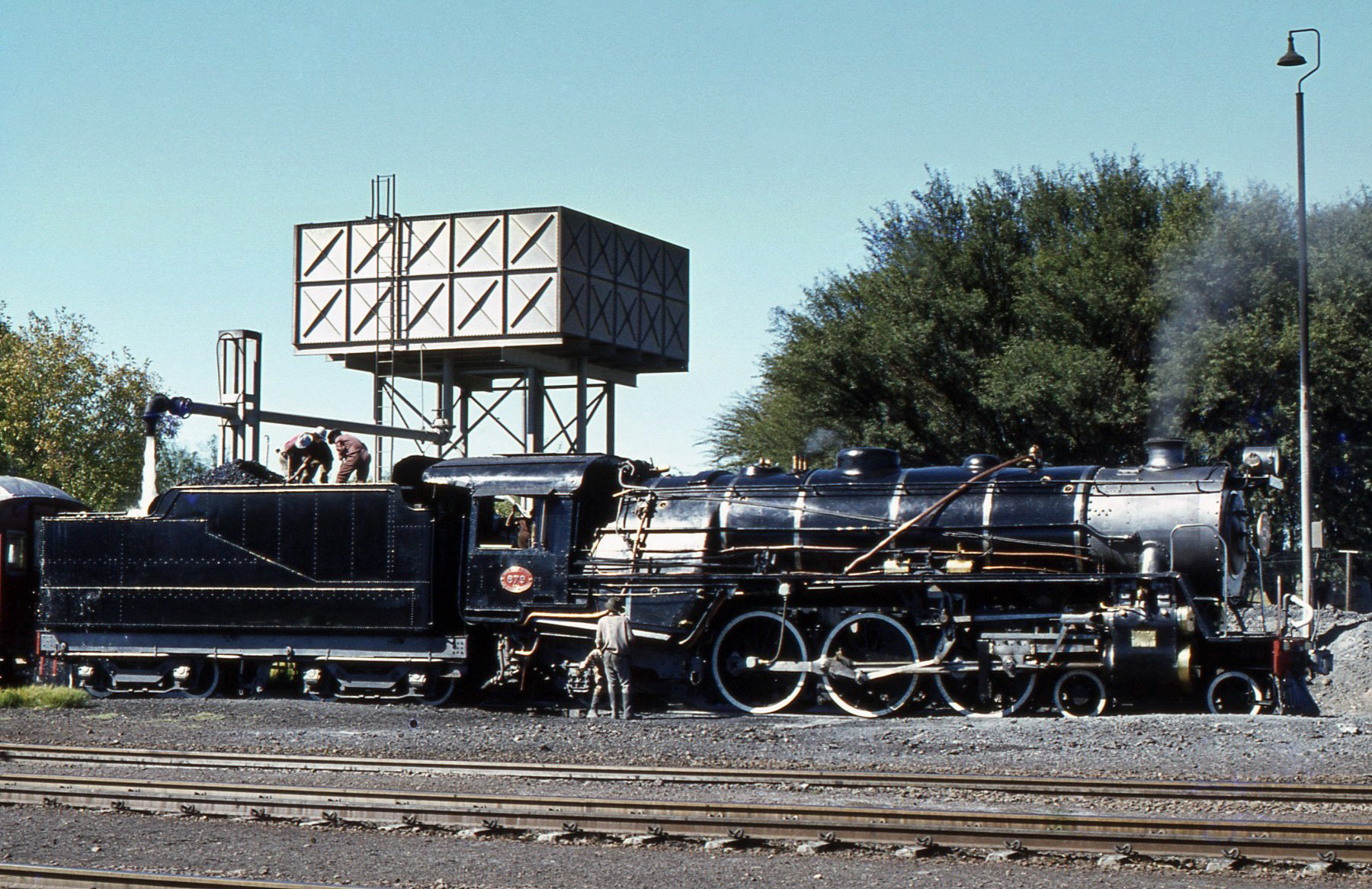
Type KT on Class 16DA, 1979

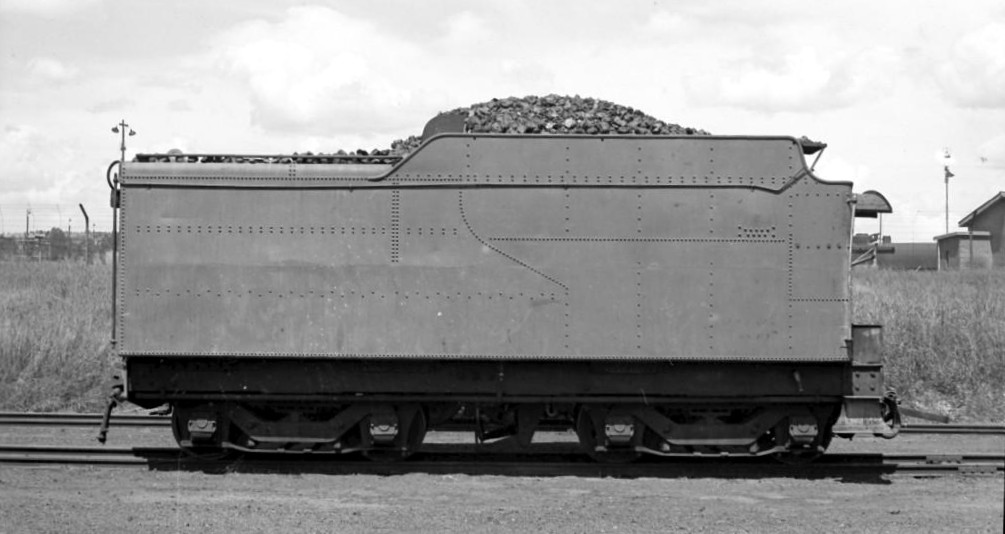
Ex Type HT tender, modified and redesignated Type KT, c. 1970
