= South African Class 16DA 4-6-2 =

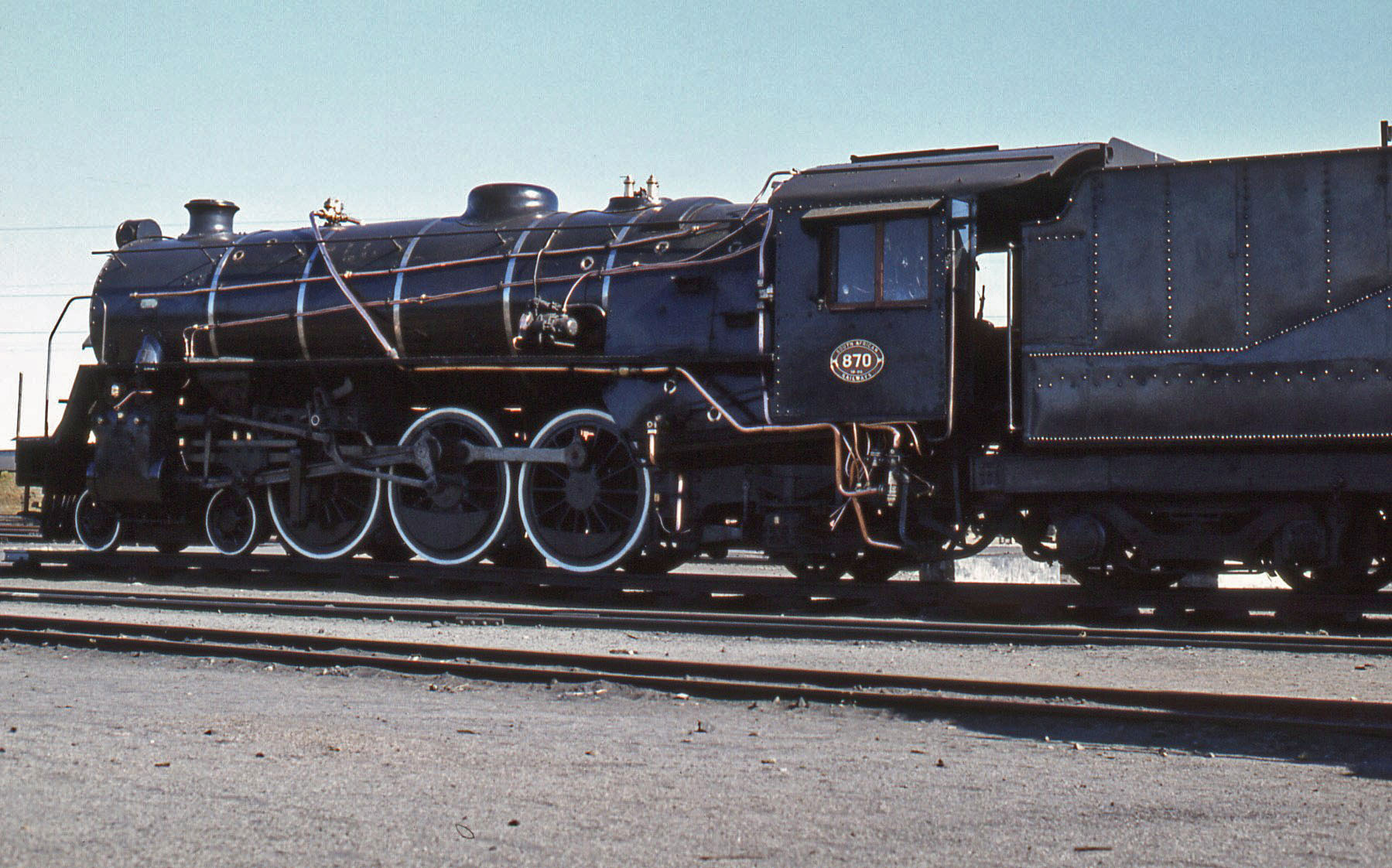
Hohenzollern-built Class 16DA of 1928

The South African Class 16DA 4-6-2 include two locomotive types, both designated Class 16DA in spite of their difference in respect of firebox size and performance.

The first type was built by Hohenzollern Locomotive Works and Baldwin Locomotive Works in 1928 and 1929 respectively.

The Henschel-built Class 16DA locomotives of 1930, with their much wider fireboxes, their correspondingly larger grate areas and slightly larger diameter trailing wheels were sufficiently different from the Baldwin and Hohenzollern-built to justify a separate classification, such as Class 16DB, but this did not happen and the locomotives ended up being known as the Wide Firebox Class 16DA.

- South African Class 16DA 4-6-2 1928 (Narrow firebox)
- South African Class 16DA 4-6-2 1930 (Wide firebox)
