= South African Class 18 2-10-2 =

1927 design of steam locomotive

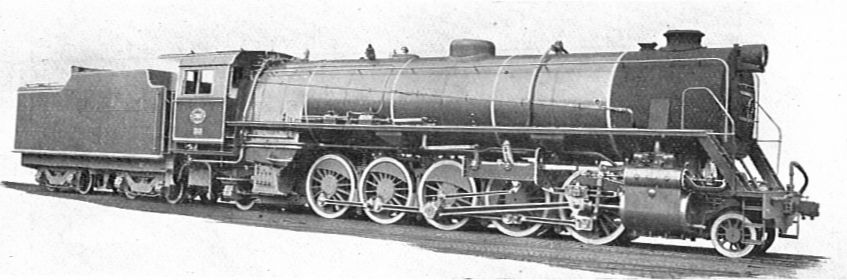
- Builder's picture of the Class 18, c. 1927
Type and origin
- Power type: Steam
- Designer: South African Railways (Col F.R. Collins DSO)
- Builder: Henschel and Son
- Serial number: 20787-20788
- Model: Class 18
- Build date: 1927
- Total produced: 2
Specifications
- Configuration
  - Whyte: 2-10-2 (Santa Fe)
  - UIC: 1'E1'h3
- Driver: 3rd coupled axle
- Gauge: 3 ft 6 in (1,067 mm) Cape gauge
- Leading dia.: 30 in (762 mm)
- Coupled dia.: 57 in (1,448 mm)
- Trailing dia.: 33 in (838 mm)
- Tender wheels: 34 in (864 mm)
- Minimum curve: 320 ft (98 m)
- Wheelbase: 67 ft 7 3/4 in (20,618 mm)
  - Engine: 38 ft 2 1/4 in (11,640 mm)
  - Coupled: 21 ft (6,401 mm)
  - Tender: 20 ft 5 in (6,223 mm)
  - Tender bogie: 6 ft 2 in (1,880 mm)
- Length
  - Over couplers: 76 ft (23,165 mm)
- Height: 13 ft (3,962 mm)
- Axle load: 19 LT (19,300 kg)
  - Leading: 7 LT 9 cwt (7,570 kg)
  - 1st coupled: 18 LT 6 cwt (18,590 kg)
  - 2nd coupled: 18 LT 18 cwt (19,200 kg)
  - 3rd coupled: 19 LT (19,300 kg)
  - 4th coupled: 18 LT 4 cwt (18,490 kg)
  - 5th coupled: 18 LT 2 cwt (18,390 kg)
  - Trailing: 14 LT 12 cwt (14,830 kg)
  - Tender bogie: Bogie 1: 33 LT 18 cwt (34,440 kg); Bogie 2: 38 LT 16 cwt (39,420 kg)
  - Tender axle: 19 LT 8 cwt (19,710 kg)
- Adhesive weight: 92 LT 10 cwt (93,980 kg)
- Loco weight: 114 LT 11 cwt (116,400 kg)
- Tender weight: 72 LT 14 cwt (73,870 kg)
- Total weight: 187 LT 5 cwt (190,300 kg)
- Tender type: HT (2-axle bogies); Mechanical stoker
- Fuel type: Coal
- Water cap.: 6,000 imp gal (27,300 L)
- Firebox
  - Type: Round-top
  - Grate area: 60 sq ft (5.6 m^{2})
- Boiler
  - Pitch: 8 ft 6 in (2,591 mm)
  - Diameter: 6 ft 3 3/4 in (1,924 mm)
  - Tube plates: 20 ft 7 in (6,274 mm)
  - Small tubes: 160: 2 1/4 in (57 mm)
  - Large tubes: 34: 5 1/2 in (140 mm)
- Boiler pressure: 215 psi (1,480 kPa)
- Safety valve: Pop
- Heating surface
  - Firebox: 265 sq ft (24.6 m^{2})
  - Tubes: 2,945 sq ft (273.6 m^{2})
  - Arch tubes: 21 sq ft (2.0 m^{2})
  - Total surface: 3,231 sq ft (300.2 m^{2})
- Superheater
  - Heating area: 850 sq ft (79 m^{2})
- Cylinders: Three
- Cylinder size: 21 1/4 in (540 mm) bore 28 in (711 mm) stroke
- Valve gear: Outer Walschaerts – Inner Gresley
- Valve type: Piston
- Couplers: AAR knuckle
Performance figures
- Tractive effort: 53,650 lbf (239 kN) @ 75%
Career
- Operators: South African Railways
- Class: Class 18
- Number in class: 2
- Numbers: 1360–1361
- Nicknames: Henschel Giant
- Delivered: 1927–1928
- First run: 1927
- Withdrawn: 1951
- The 3rd & 4th coupled axles had flangeless wheels

The South African Railways Class 18 2-10-2 of 1927 was a steam locomotive.

In December 1927 and January 1928 the South African Railways placed two Class 18 three-cylinder steam locomotives with a 2-10-2 Santa Fe type wheel arrangement in service on the Witbank-Germiston coal line.

== Manufacturer ==
The Class 18 2-10-2 Santa Fe type steam locomotive was designed by Colonel F.R. Collins DSO, Chief Mechanical Engineer (CME) of the South African Railways (SAR) from 1922 to 1929, and built by Henschel and Son in Germany. Two locomotives were delivered in 1927 and 1928, numbered 1360 and 1361.

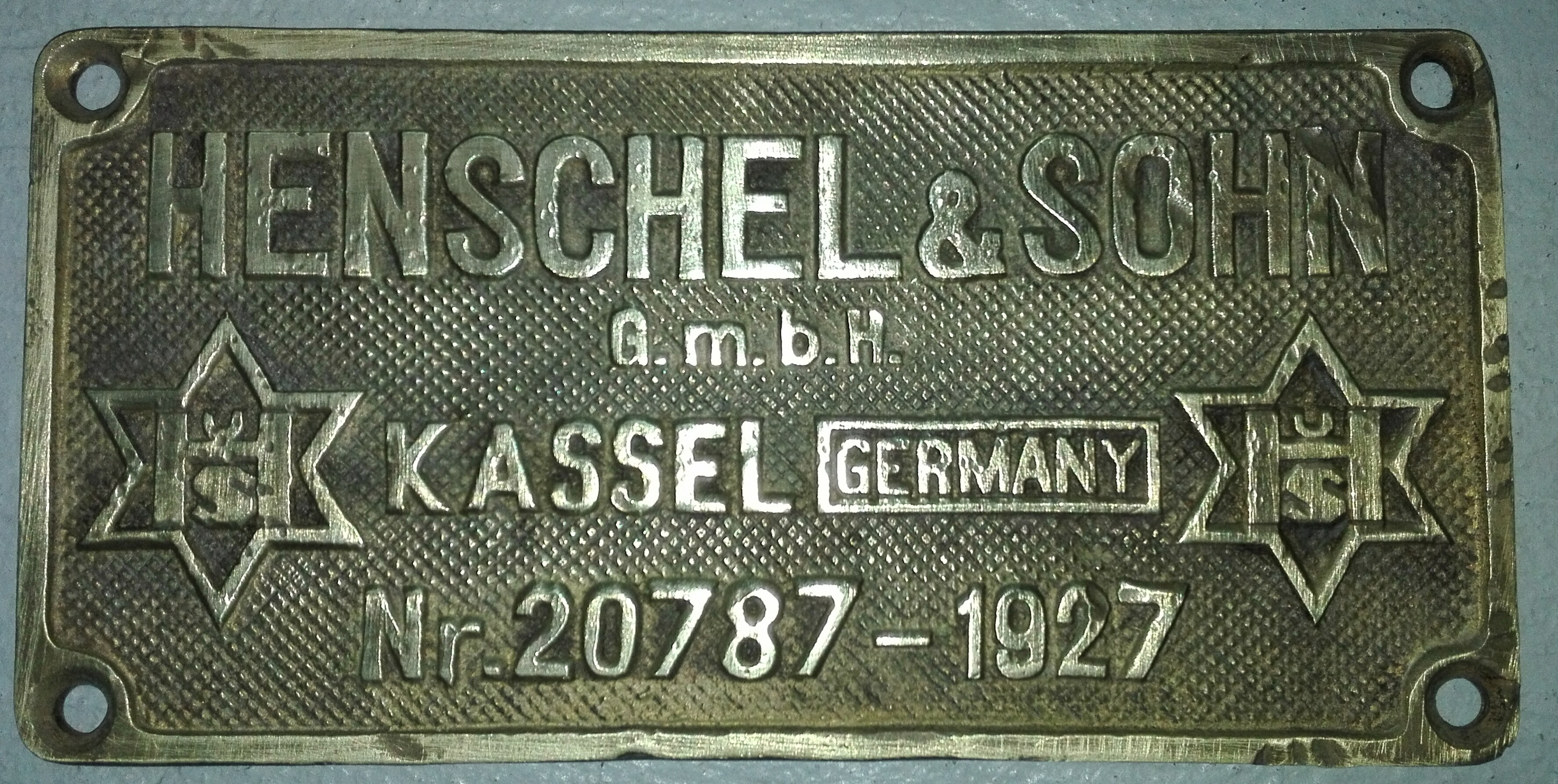

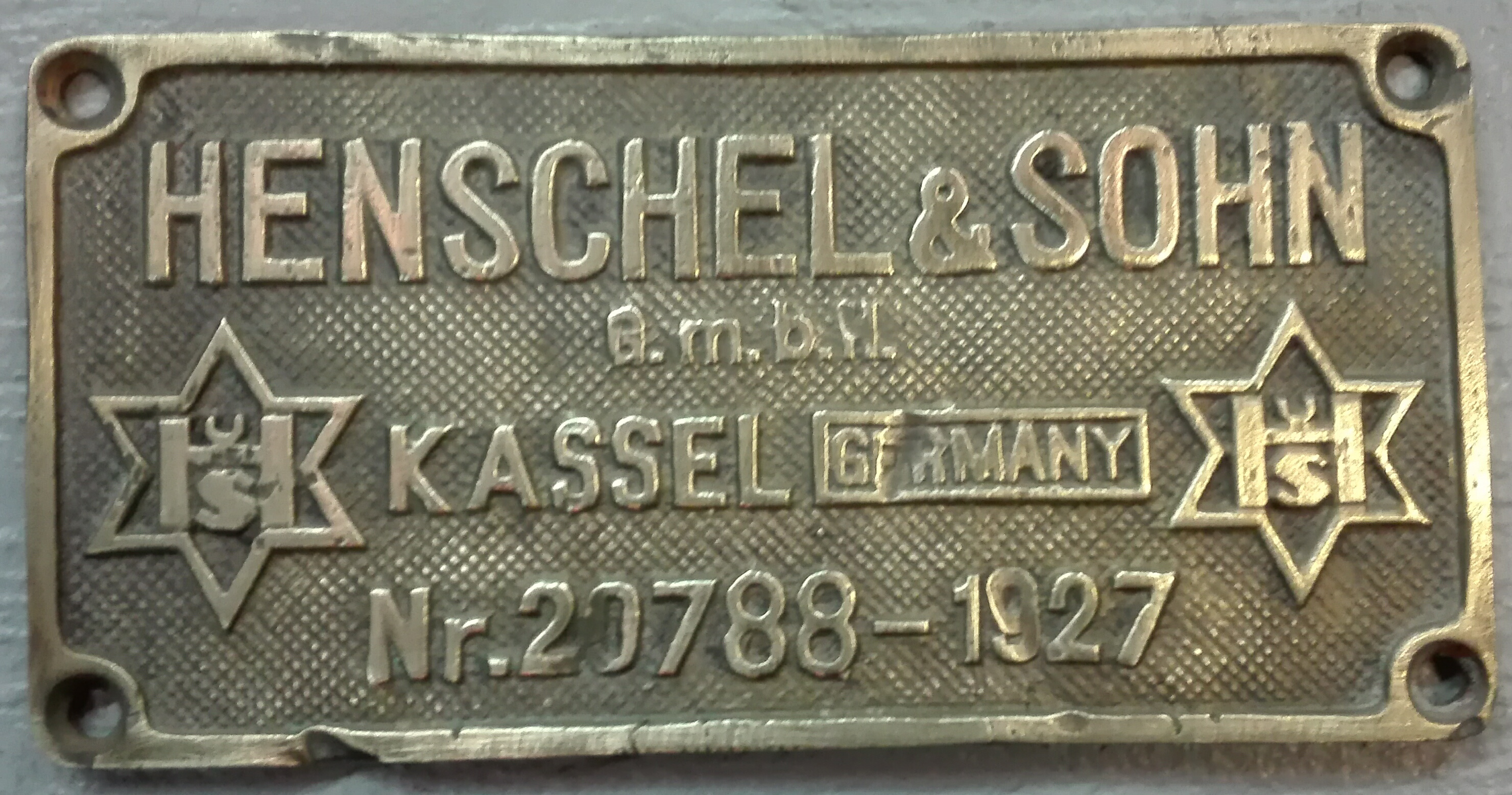

== Characteristics ==
They were very powerful three-cylinder locomotives. At the time, three-cylindered locomotives were being built in appreciable numbers in Europe and America. Factors in their favour were their more even turning moment, improved balancing and better distribution of crank-pin thrust. Drawbacks were increased complexity and higher repair cost.

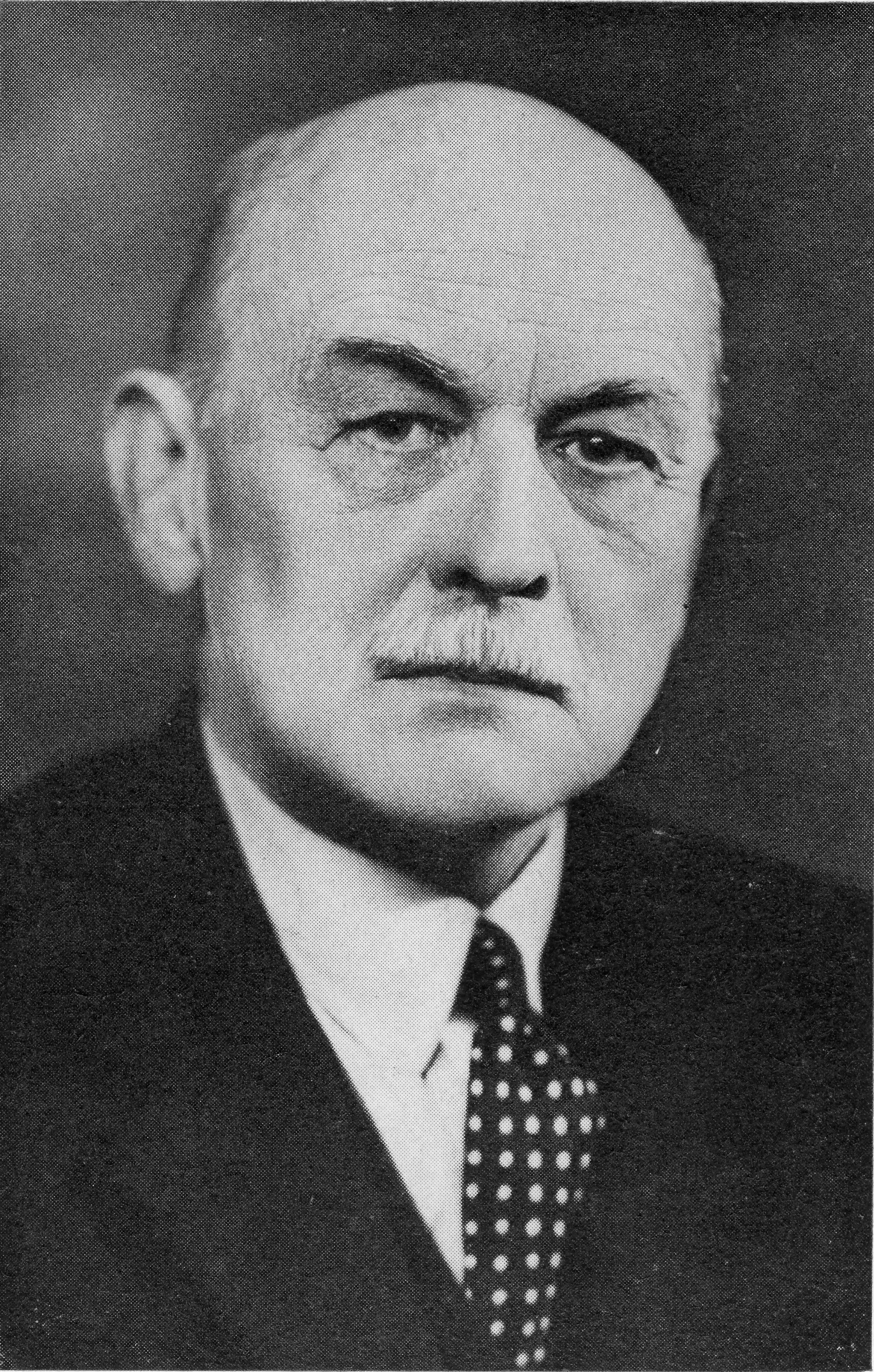
Col F.R. Collins DSO

When delivered, the third cylinder was clearly visible, but plating was subsequently added beneath the smokebox and hid it from view. These were the most powerful non-articulated steam locomotives to see service on the SAR, with a tractive effort of 53,650 pounds-force (239 kilonewtons) at 75% boiler pressure and capable of hauling loads of 1,800 long tons (1,829 tonnes) over the ruling gradient of 1 in 100 (1%) on the Witbank-Apex section.

Contemporary Henschel publicity appropriately referred to them as the "Henschel Giants". They were larger in most respects than Deutsche Reichsbahn's new Standard gauge Class 44 three-cylinder 2-10-0 locomotives. Although their all-up locomotive weight was almost the same, when considering the fact that the SAR's Cape gauge Class 18 had shorter axles and frame stretchers, saving weight that could then be built into other items such as the firebox, the Class 18 was the larger locomotive.

The Class 18 had a round-topped firebox with a combustion chamber and with arch tubes supporting the brick arch. It was fired by a Duplex D.4 type mechanical stoker, operated by a four-cylinder steam engine on its Type HT tender, which had a coal capacity of 14 long tons (14.2 tonnes), a water capacity of 6,000 imperial gallons (27,300 litres) and a maximum axle load of 19 long tons 8 hundredweight (19,710 kilograms).

To allow the locomotive to negotiate curves of 320 feet (98 metres) radius despite its long coupled wheelbase, the third and fourth pairs of driving wheels were flangeless. In addition, the locomotive made use of a Krauss-Helmholtz bogie system, where the leading pair of driving wheels has a limited amount of sideplay with an articulated link to the leading bissel bogie. The bissel bogie was connected to a sleeve around the first driving axle so that any displacement of the bissel bogie in one direction would cause a similar displacement of the leading driving axle in the opposite direction, thereby steering the driving wheels through curves.

The outside cylinders drove the third pair of driving wheels while the inside cylinder drove the second pair through a cranked axle, with the cylinder mounted in an inclined position. The three cranks were arranged at an angle of 120 degrees to each other, allowing for the inclination of the inner cylinder.

== Service ==
The Class 18 was introduced in an attempt to ease problems which were being experienced with increasingly heavy coal trains on the line between Witbank and Germiston, where the Class MF Mallets were considered as being too sluggish and the hauling capacity of the non-articulated fleet was being stretched to the limit.

In service, the locomotives disappointed. In spite of the two sets of flangeless coupled wheels and the Krauss-Helmholtz system, the Class 18 experienced excessive flange and tyre wear while the Chief Civil Engineer claimed increased rail wear. The cylinder design was outdated and along with the lightweight motion and rods, contributed to them being uneconomical high-maintenance machines. The complicated valve gear was not robust enough and frequently gave trouble owing to wear and breakage. The result was that the locomotives had to be shopped at under 40,000 miles (64,374 kilometres).

Both Class 18 locomotives were withdrawn by 1951. After their locomotives were withdrawn from service, the two Type HT tenders had their mechanical stokers removed and their drawgear modified for use with Class 15CA locomotives. They were then redesignated Type KT.

== Knuckle couplers ==
In 1927, the SAR began to convert the couplers of its Cape Gauge rolling stock from the Johnston link-and-pin coupling system which had been in use since the establishment of the Cape Government Railways in 1873, to AAR knuckle couplers. Judging from contemporary photographs as well as the official SAR Locomotive Diagram Book and the dimensional locomotive drawings as published by Holland, which were for the most part based on the original as-delivered and unmodified locomotives, the Class 18 locomotives were delivered new with knuckle couplers fitted, as were the Classes GCA, GF, HF and U which also entered service in 1927.

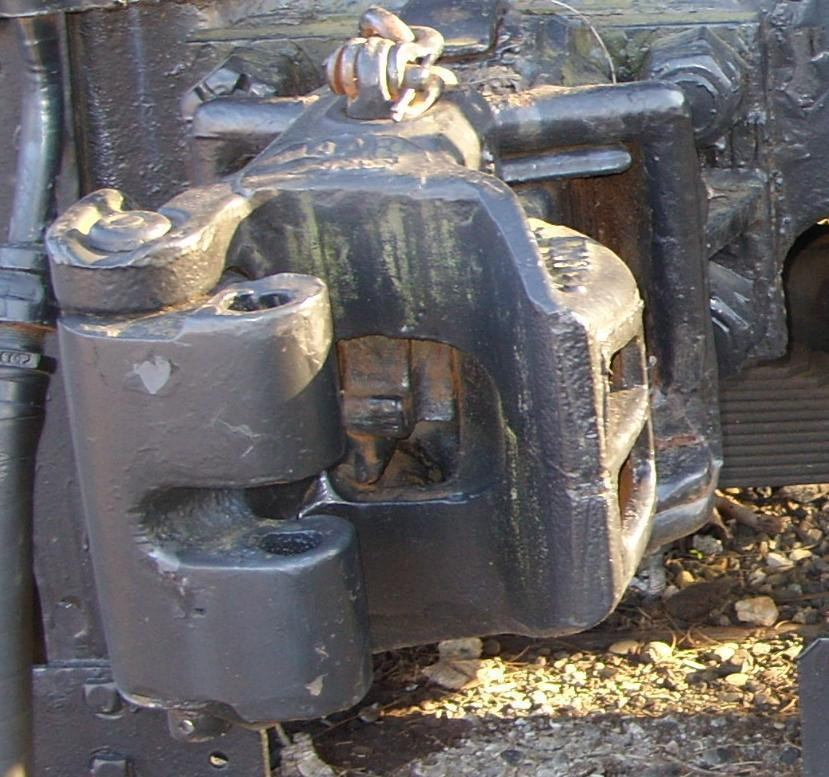
Transition era knuckle coupler

Conversion of all rolling stock would take several years and both coupler types could still be seen on rolling stock into the late 1950s. During the transition period, knuckle couplers on locomotives had a horizontal gap and a vertical hole in the knuckle itself to accommodate a link and a pin respectively. This enabled them to couple to vehicles which were still equipped with the older Johnston couplers.

Knuckle couplers had first been used in South Africa more than two decades earlier. The Central South African Railways (CSAR) introduced Gould knuckle couplers on the rolling stock of its Limited Express and Imperial Mail passenger trains in 1904. The Limited Express operated between Pretoria and Johannesburg while the Imperial Mail operated between Pretoria and Cape Town. These knuckle-couplers also had split knuckles to accommodate coupling to the old Johnston couplers with a link and pin, since the CSAR retained the old couplers on all their locomotives to keep them compatible with their own goods and older passenger rolling stock as well as with that from the other railways it connected with.

== Illustration ==
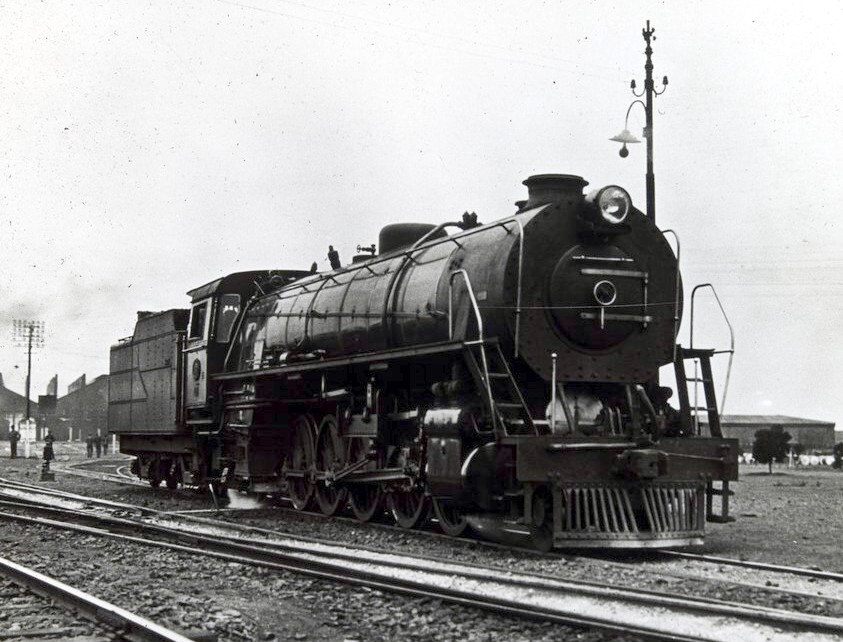
Class 18 with the third cylinder visible, as delivered, c. 1930

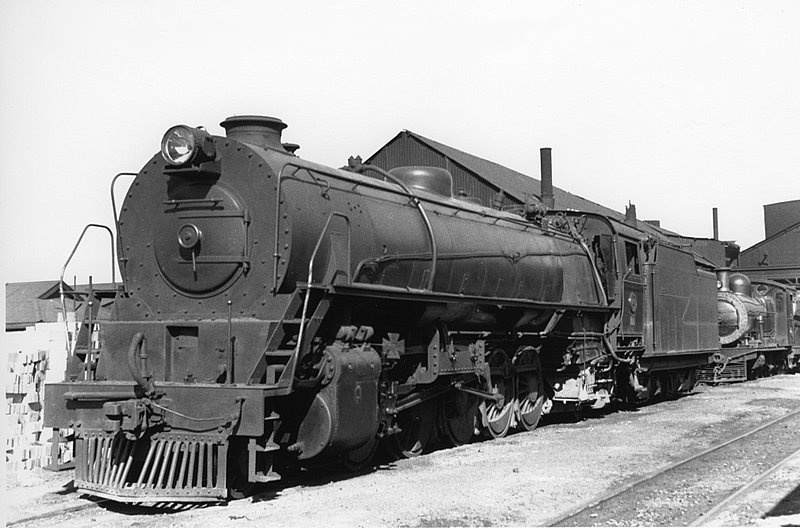
Class 18 with plating beneath the smokebox hiding the third cylinder

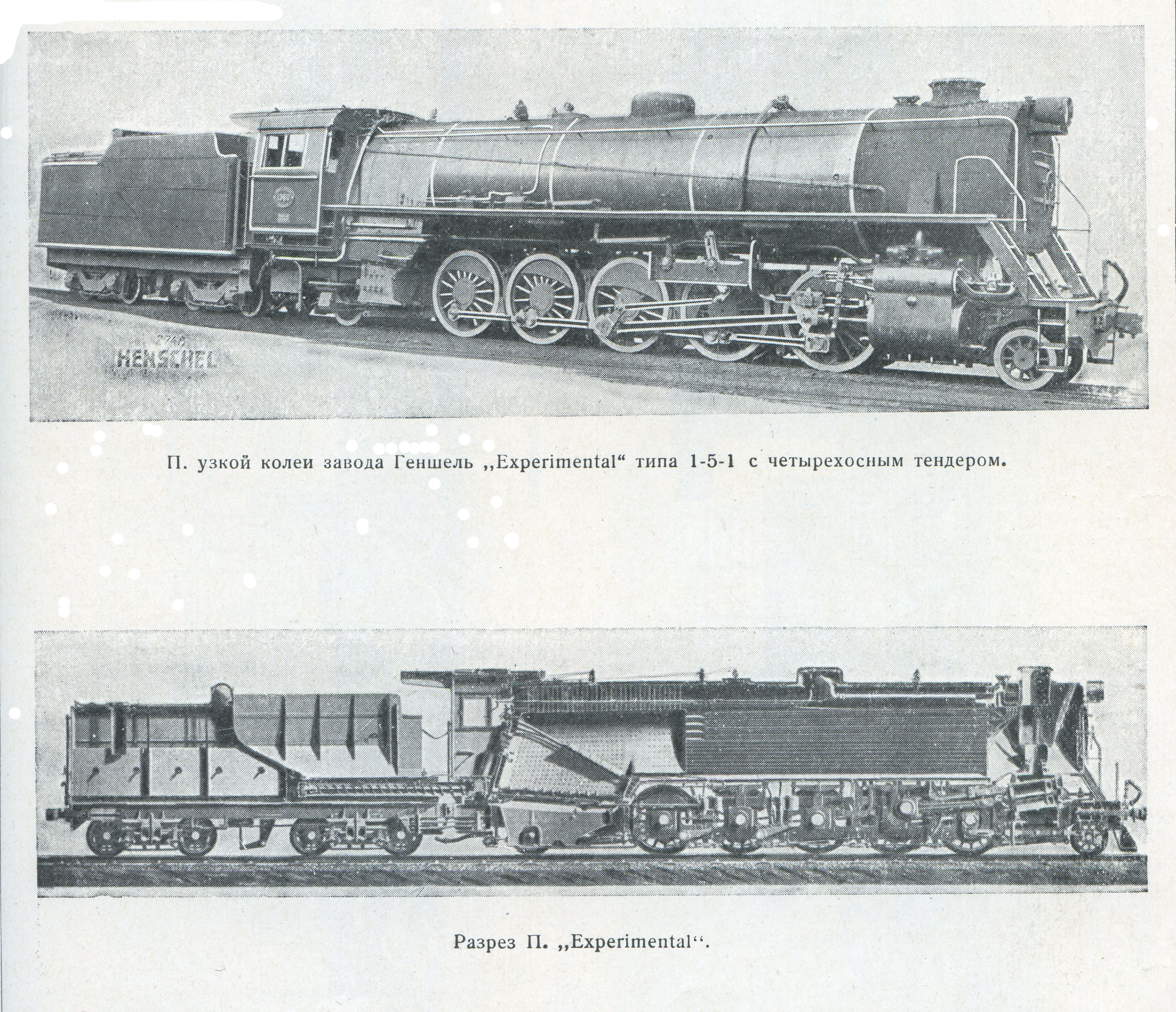
Cutaway diagram of a Class 18 2-10-2 locomotive

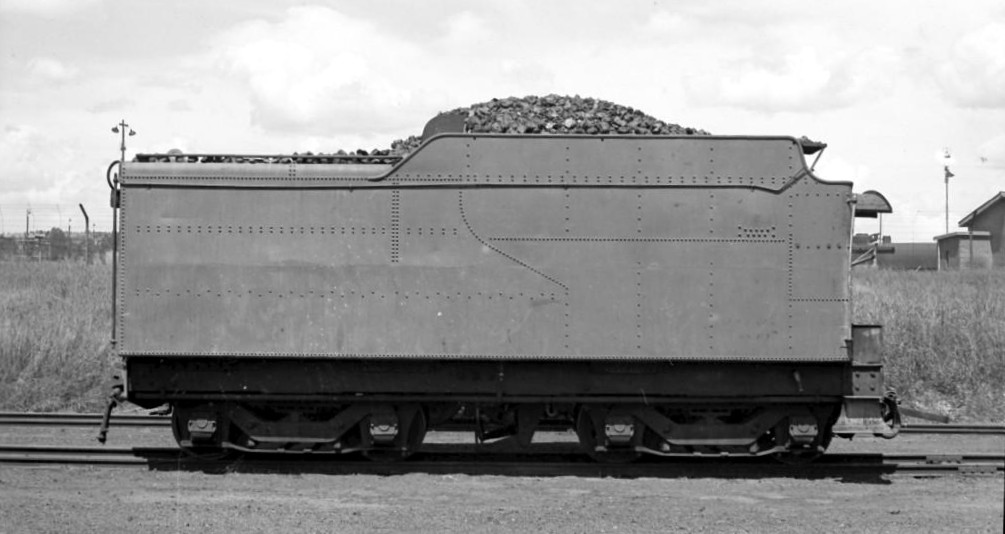
Ex Type HT tender, modified and redesignated Type KT, c. 1970
