= South African Class 16DA 4-6-2 1928 =

1928 design of steam locomotive

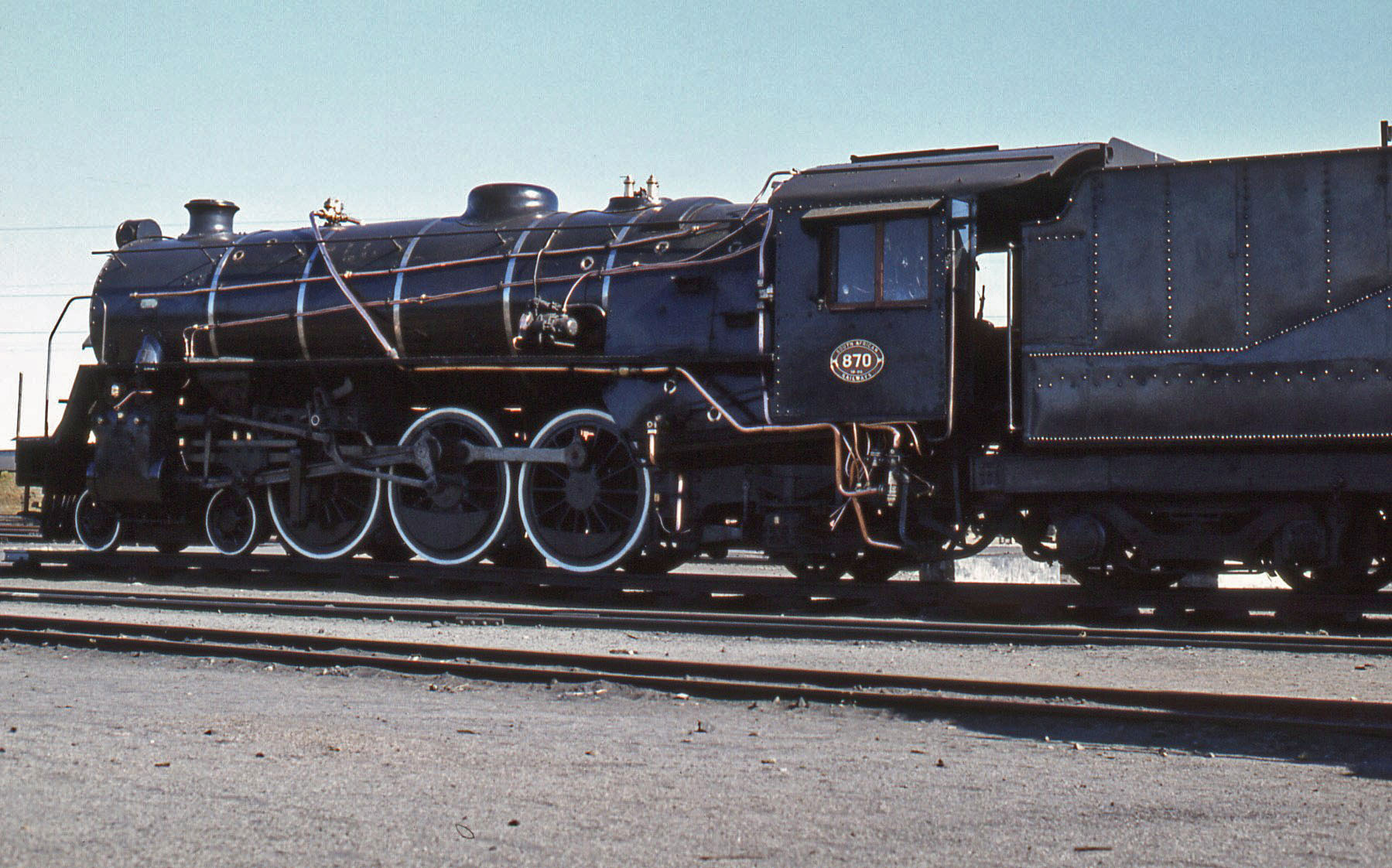
- Hohenzollern-built no. 870, 4 April 1979
Type and origin
- ♠ With 60 inch (1,524 mm) coupled wheels ♥ With 63 inch (1,600 mm) coupled wheels ♣ 22x26 Cylinders – ♦ 23x26 Cylinders
- Power type: Steam
- Designer: South African Railways (Col F.R. Collins DSO)
- Builder: Hohenzollern Locomotive Works; Baldwin Locomotive Works
- Serial number: Hohenzollern 4653-4658; Baldwin 60820-60827
- Model: Class 16DA
- Build date: 1928-1929
- Total produced: 14
Specifications
- Configuration
  - Whyte: 4-6-2 (Pacific)
  - UIC: 2'C1'h2
- Driver: 2nd coupled axle
- Gauge: 3 ft 6 in (1,067 mm) Cape gauge
- Leading dia.: 30 in (762 mm)
- Coupled dia.: ♠ 60 in (1,524 mm) ♥ 63 in (1,600 mm)
- Trailing dia.: 33 in (838 mm)
- Tender wheels: 34 in (864 mm)
- Wheelbase: 60 ft 3 3/16 in (18,369 mm)
  - Engine: 30 ft 8 in (9,347 mm)
  - Leading: 6 ft 10 in (2,083 mm)
  - Coupled: 11 ft (3,353 mm)
  - Tender: 20 ft 5 in (6,223 mm)
  - Tender bogie: 6 ft 2 in (1,880 mm)
- Length
  - Over couplers: 68 ft 4 3/16 in (20,833 mm)
- Height: ♠ 12 ft 10 in (3,912 mm) ♥ 12 ft 11 1/2 in (3,950 mm)
- Frame type: Bar
- Axle load: ♠ 18 LT 15 cwt (19,050 kg) ♥ 19 LT 2 cwt (19,410 kg)
  - Leading: ♠♥ 18 LT 10 cwt (18,800 kg)
  - Coupled: ♠ 18 LT 15 cwt (19,050 kg)
  - 1st coupled: ♥ 19 LT 2 cwt (19,410 kg)
  - 2nd coupled: ♥ 19 LT (19,300 kg)
  - 3rd coupled: ♥ 19 LT 2 cwt (19,410 kg)
  - Trailing: ♠♥ 14 LT 17 cwt (15,090 kg)
  - Tender bogie: Bogie 1: 33 LT 18 cwt (34,440 kg); Bogie 2: 35 LT 10 cwt (36,070 kg)
  - Tender axle: 17 LT 15 cwt (18,030 kg)
- Adhesive weight: ♠ 56 LT 5 cwt (57,150 kg) ♥ 57 LT 4 cwt (58,120 kg)
- Loco weight: ♠ 89 LT 12 cwt (91,040 kg) ♥ 90 LT 11 cwt (92,000 kg)
- Tender weight: 69 LT 8 cwt (70,510 kg)
- Total weight: ♠ 159 LT (161,600 kg) ♥ 159 LT 19 cwt (162,500 kg)
- Tender type: KT (2-axle bogies)
- Fuel type: Coal
- Fuel capacity: 14 LT (14.2 t)
- Water cap.: 6,000 imp gal (27,300 L)
- Firebox
  - Type: Round-top
  - Grate area: 45 sq ft (4.2 m^{2})
- Boiler
  - Pitch: ♠ 8 ft 6 in (2,591 mm) ♥ 8 ft 7 1/2 in (2,629 mm)
  - Diameter: 5 ft 10 1/4 in (1,784 mm)
  - Tube plates: 17 ft 10 5/8 in (5,451 mm)
  - Small tubes: 181: 2 in (51 mm)
  - Large tubes: 30: 5 3/8 in (137 mm)
- Boiler pressure: ♠ 195 psi (1,344 kPa) ♥ 205 psi (1,413 kPa)
- Safety valve: Pop
- Heating surface
  - Firebox: 164 sq ft (15.2 m^{2})
  - Tubes: 2,453 sq ft (227.9 m^{2})
  - Arch tubes: 22 sq ft (2.0 m^{2})
  - Total surface: 2,639 sq ft (245.2 m^{2})
- Superheater
  - Heating area: 593 sq ft (55.1 m^{2})
- Cylinders: Two
- Cylinder size: ♣ 22 in (559 mm) bore ♦ 23 in (584 mm) bore ♣♦ 26 in (660 mm) stroke
- Valve gear: Walschaerts
- Valve type: Piston
- Couplers: AAR knuckle
Performance figures
- Tractive effort: ♠♣ 30,670 lbf (136.4 kN) @ 75% ♠♦ 33,530 lbf (149.1 kN) @ 75% ♥♣ 30,710 lbf (136.6 kN) @ 75% ♥♦ 33,570 lbf (149.3 kN) @ 75%
Career
- Operators: South African Railways
- Class: Class 16DA
- Number in class: 14
- Numbers: 843-850 & 868-873
- Delivered: 1928-1929
- First run: 1928
- Withdrawn: 1973

The South African Railways Class 16DA 4-6-2 of 1928 was a steam locomotive.

In 1928, the South African Railways placed six Class 16DA steam locomotives with a 4-6-2 Pacific type wheel arrangement in passenger train service. Eight more entered service in 1929.

== Manufacturers ==
Further orders for locomotives similar to the Class 16D Pacific type locomotive were placed for the South African Railways (SAR) in 1928. The design of the earlier engines was modified by the Chief Mechanical Engineer (CME), Colonel F.R. Collins DSO, along the same lines as his design of the Class 15CA Mountain type.

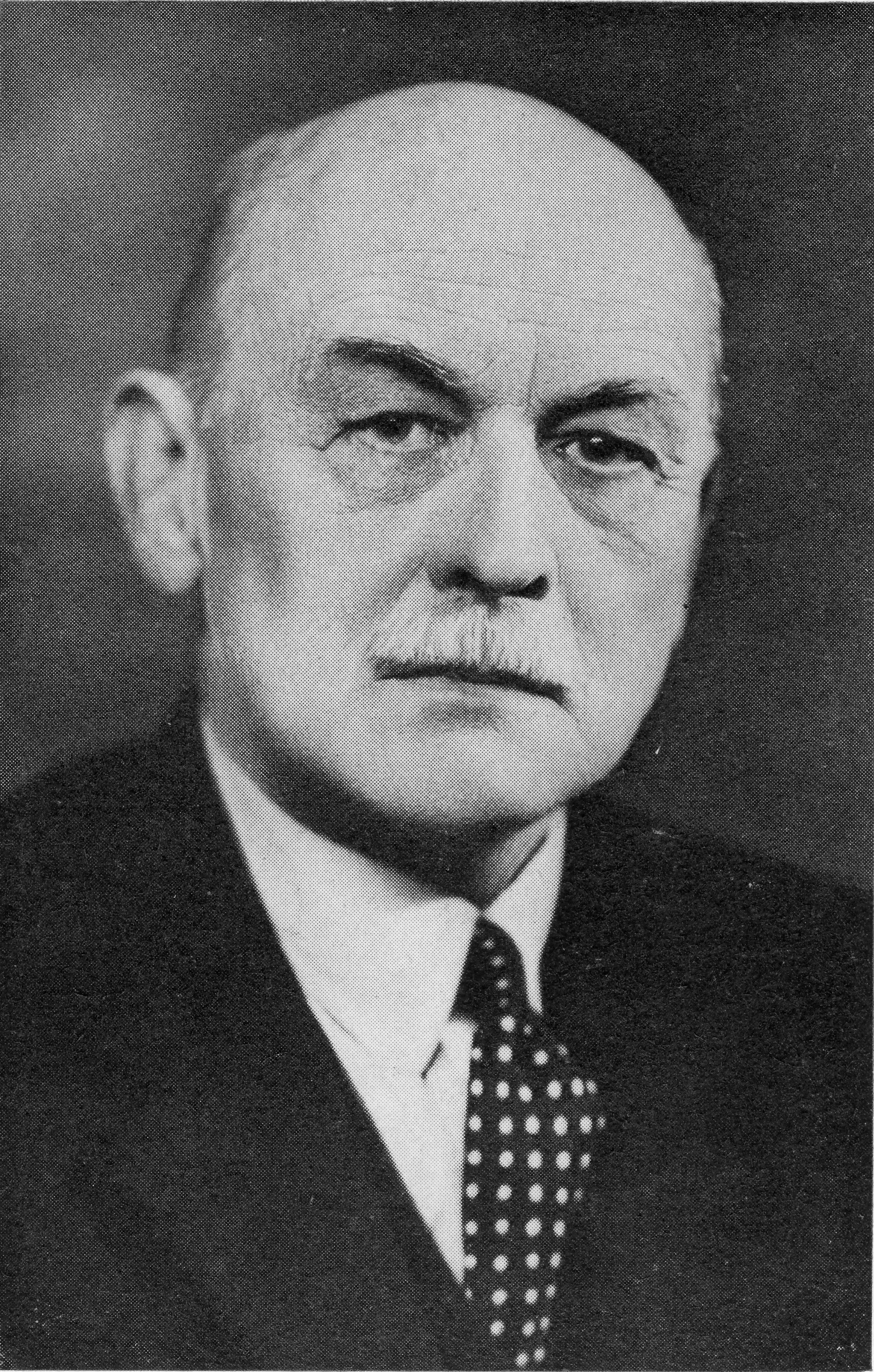
Col F.R. Collins DSO

This consisted of a locomotive bar frame which was shorter to end at the front of the firebox, with a bridle casting to create a widened frame extension below the firebox and the cab to the rear dragbox to gain more ashpan room under the firebox.

These redesigned locomotives were designated Class 16DA and were built by two manufacturers in 1928 and 1929. The first six, numbered in the range from 868 to 873, were built in Germany by Hohenzollern Locomotive Works and entered service in 1928. Another eight locomotives, numbered in the range from 843 to 850, were built in the United States of America by Baldwin Locomotive Works and entered service in 1929.

== Characteristics ==
The Hohenzollern and Baldwin-built Class 16DA locomotives basically differed from the predecessor Class 16D only by virtue of its shortened frame and bridle casting, the Class 16D having had a frame extending all the way from the front buffer beam to the rear dragbox. They used the same Type KT tenders with a coal capacity of 14 long tons (14.2 tonnes) and a water capacity of 6,000 imperial gallons (27,300 litres). As delivered, they had 60 inches (1,524 millimetres) diameter coupled wheels and their cylinders were of 22 inches (559 millimetres) bore and 26 inches (660 millimetres) stroke. Their boiler operating pressure was set at 195 pounds per square inch (1,344 kilopascals).

== Modification ==
During the 1940s six of these locomotives, three from each manufacturer group, were retyred with 63 inches (1,600 millimetres) diameter tyres on their coupled wheels. To not have their tractive effort reduced by the larger coupled wheels, their cylinders were reamed from a bore of 22 to 23 inches (559 to 584 millimetres) and their operating boiler pressure was raised to 205 pounds per square inch (1,410 kilopascals). All the modified locomotives remained classified as Class 16DA.

When the larger tyres were fitted, the old tyres were left in position and turned down on the wheel centres to serve as liners and the new tyres were then shrunk on over the liners. The practice of increasing the diameter of coupled wheels, wheel spacing and other considerations permitting, was begun by A.G. Watson during his term in office as CME and was continued by his successors. The reduction of tractive effort caused by the larger wheels was made up by increasing boiler pressures or by fitting larger cylinders or both, as required. This policy resulted in more mileage between heavy repairs, less cost-per-mile on repairs and locomotives capable of higher speeds.

== Service ==
The Class 16DA Pacifics were initially placed in passenger service between Johannesburg and Kimberley where they regularly worked trains like the Union Express and Union Limited, which became the Blue Train after the Second World War. From 1930 the new Henschel-built wide-firebox Class 16DA took over this duty.

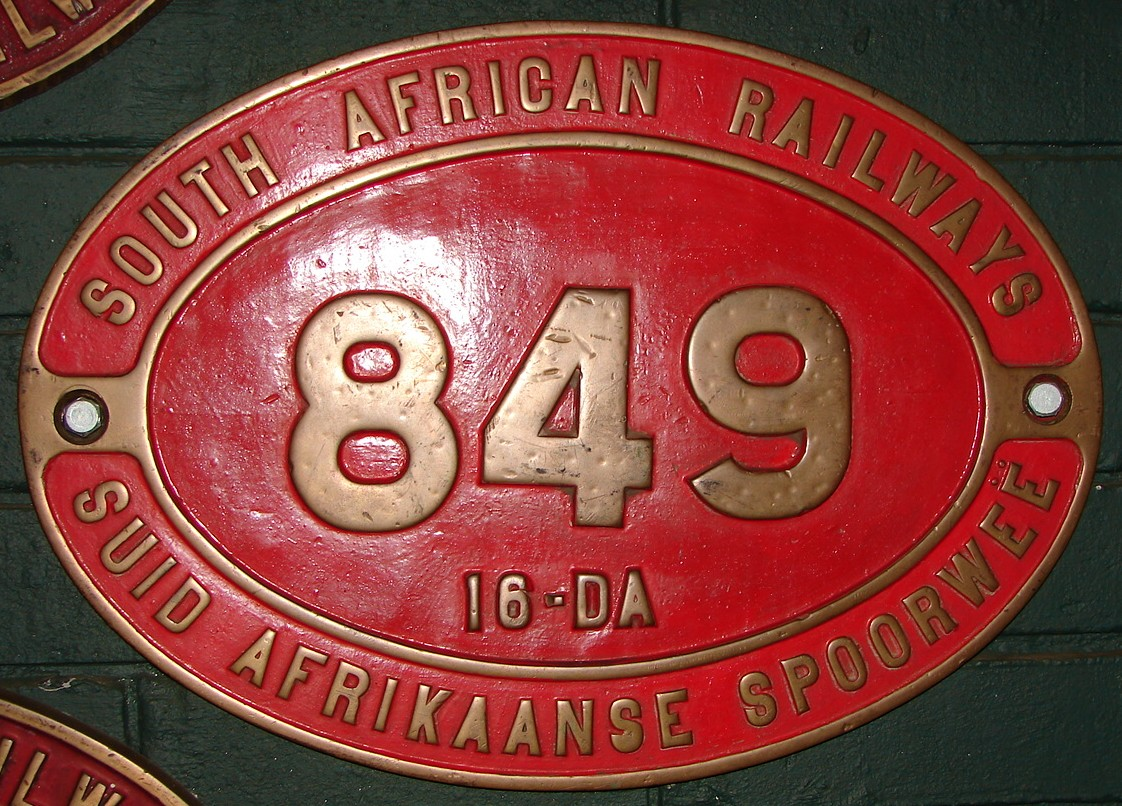

In 1939–1940, when new air-conditioned rolling stock was placed in service on the Union Limited and Union Express services between Cape Town and Johannesburg, all the Class 16DA and Class 16E locomotives were transferred to Bloemfontein in the Orange Free State. From here, they continued to work passenger trains north and south, including the Orange Express, until the Class 15F replaced them and they were relegated to suburban and local passenger train work. By the early 1950s, the suburban trains to Lynchfield and Melorane were handled by narrow-firebox Class 16DA locomotives which only occasionally worked mainline passenger trains by then. They were withdrawn from service in 1973.

Four of the Baldwin-built locomotives were sold into industrial service. No. 844 went to Hlobane Colliery in Natal and later to Umgala Colliery. Numbers 845, 847 and 848 went to Wankie Colliery in Rhodesia, where they became numbers 5 to 7 in reverse order. After they were finally withdrawn in 1982, one of these three was plinthed alongside the main North road at Hwange. Another of the Baldwin-built locomotives, no. 850, is plinthed at Theunissen in the Free State.

== Works numbers ==
The table lists the Hohenzollern and Baldwin Class 16DA engine numbers, builders, years built, works numbers and variations in coupled wheel sizes.

Class 16DA 4-6-2 Builders, Works Numbers & Variations
SAR No.	Builder	Year	Works No.	Coupled wheel dia.
843	Baldwin	1929	60820	63"/1600mm
844	Baldwin	1929	60821	60"/1524mm
845	Baldwin	1929	60822	60"/1524mm
846	Baldwin	1929	60823	63"/1600mm
847	Baldwin	1929	60824	60"/1524mm
848	Baldwin	1929	60825	63"/1600mm
849	Baldwin	1929	60826	60"/1524mm
850	Baldwin	1929	60827	60"/1524mm
868	Hohenzollern	1928	4653	63"/1600mm
869	Hohenzollern	1928	4654	63"/1600mm
870	Hohenzollern	1928	4655	60"/1524mm
871	Hohenzollern	1928	4656	60"/1524mm
872	Hohenzollern	1928	4657	60"/1524mm
873	Hohenzollern	1928	4658	63"/1600mm

== Preservation ==
Number	Works nmr	THF / Private	Leaselend / Owner	Current Location	Outside SOUTH AFRICA	?
848		Private	Wanki Collery	Main Street	Zimbabwe	next to Wanki Highway
850		Private	Theunissen Municipality	Main Street		
870		THF		Krugersdorp Locomotive Depot		
876		THF	Transnet Heritage Foundation (Museum)	Bloemfontein Locomotive Depot		
878		THF	Transnet Engineering	Bloemfontein Locomotive Depot		
879		THF	Ceres Railway Company	Cape Town Station		

== Illustration ==
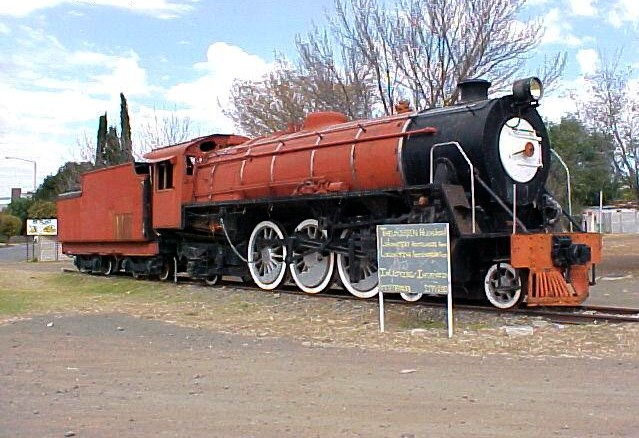
Baldwin-built no. 850 at Theunissen, 29 May 2005

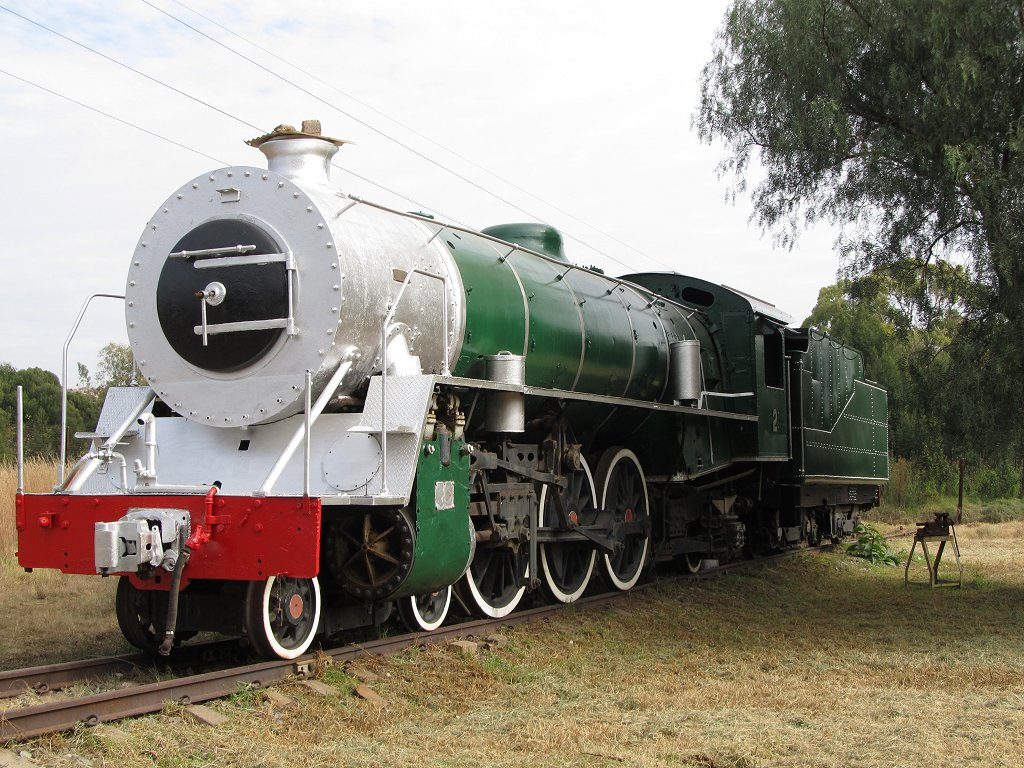
Baldwin-built no. 844 at the SANRASM South Site, June 2011
