= South African Class 16D 4-6-2 =

1925 design of steam locomotive

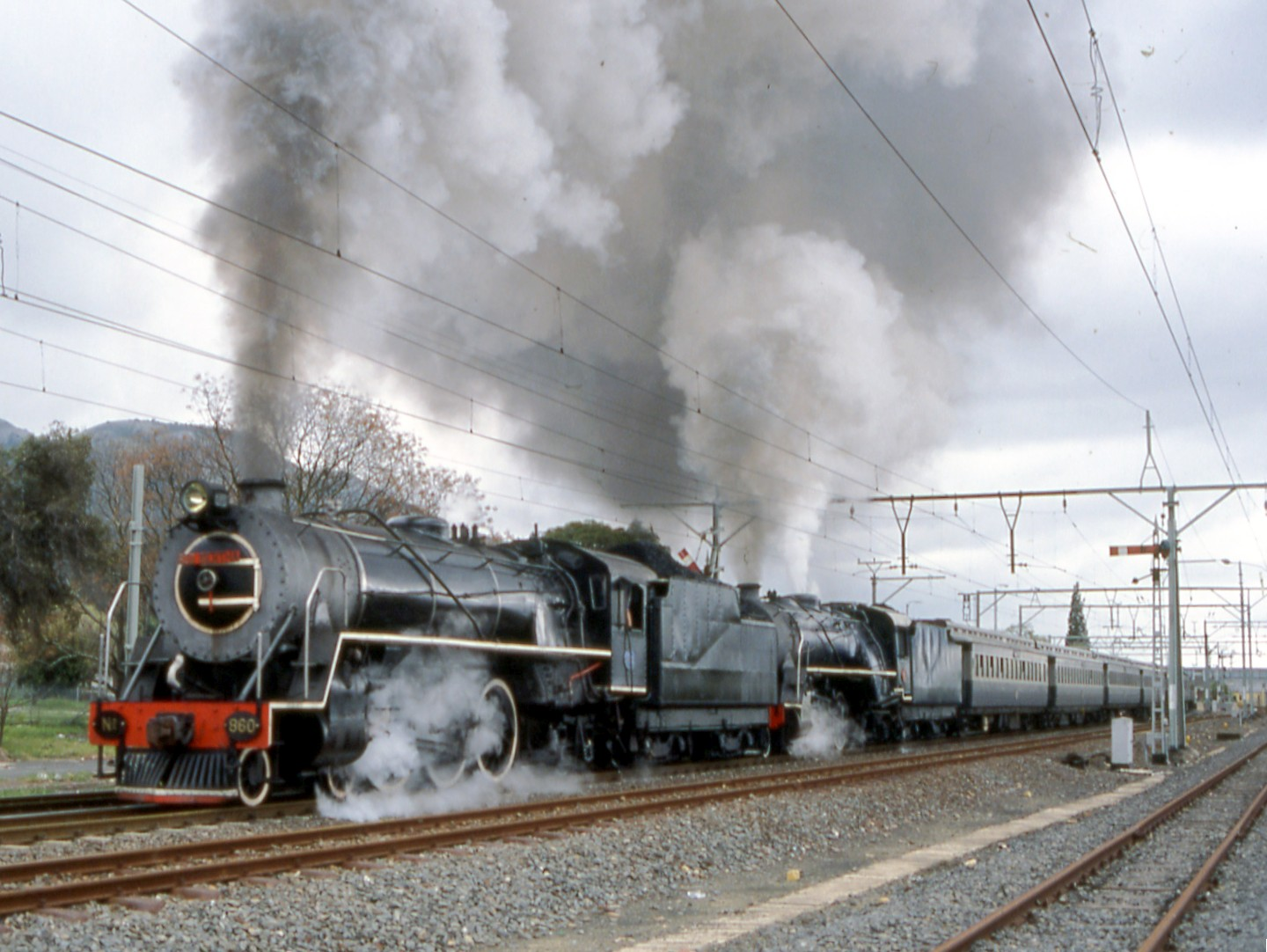
- No. 860 on the Union Limited, Paarl, c. 2001
Type and origin
- ♠ With 60 inch (1,520 mm) coupled wheels ♥ With 63 inch (1,600 mm) coupled wheels ♣ 22x26 Cylinders – ♦ 23x26 Cylinders
- Power type: Steam
- Designer: Baldwin Locomotive Works
- Builder: Baldwin Locomotive Works
- Serial number: 58309-58310, 58703-58707
- Model: Class 16D
- Build date: 1925–1926
- Total produced: 7
Specifications
- Configuration
  - Whyte: 4-6-2 (Pacific)
  - UIC: 2'C1'h4
- Driver: 2nd coupled axle
- Gauge: 3 ft 6 in (1,067 mm) Cape gauge
- Leading dia.: 30 in (762 mm)
- Coupled dia.: ♠ 60 in (1,524 mm) ♥ 63 in (1,600 mm)
- Trailing dia.: 33 in (838 mm)
- Tender wheels: 34 in (864 mm)
- Wheelbase: 60 ft 3 3/16 in (18,369 mm)
  - Engine: 30 ft 8 in (9,347 mm)
  - Leading: 6 ft 10 in (2,083 mm)
  - Coupled: 11 ft (3,353 mm)
  - Tender: 20 ft 5 in (6,223 mm)
  - Tender bogie: 6 ft 2 in (1,880 mm)
- Length
  - Over couplers: 68 ft 2 3/16 in (20,782 mm)
- Height: ♠ 12 ft 10 in (3,912 mm) ♥ 12 ft 11 1/2 in (3,950 mm)
- Frame type: Bar
- Axle load: ♠ 18 LT 15 cwt (19,050 kg) ♥ 19 LT 2 cwt (19,410 kg)
  - Leading: ♠ 18 LT 10 cwt (18,800 kg) ♥ 18 LT 10 cwt (18,800 kg)
  - Coupled: ♠ 18 LT 15 cwt (19,050 kg)
  - 1st coupled: ♥ 19 LT 2 cwt (19,410 kg)
  - 2nd coupled: ♥ 19 LT (19,300 kg)
  - 3rd coupled: ♥ 19 LT 2 cwt (19,410 kg)
  - Trailing: ♠♥ 14 LT 17 cwt (15,090 kg)
  - Tender bogie: Bogie 1: 33 LT 18 cwt (34,440 kg); Bogie 2: 35 LT 10 cwt (36,070 kg)
  - Tender axle: 17 LT 15 cwt (18,030 kg)
- Adhesive weight: ♠ 56 LT 5 cwt (57,150 kg) ♥ 57 LT 4 cwt (58,120 kg)
- Loco weight: ♠ 89 LT 12 cwt (91,040 kg) ♥ 90 LT 11 cwt (92,000 kg)
- Tender weight: 69 LT 8 cwt (70,510 kg)
- Total weight: ♠ 159 LT (161,600 kg) ♥ 159 LT 19 cwt (162,500 kg)
- Tender type: KT (2-axle bogies)
- Fuel type: Coal
- Fuel capacity: 14 LT (14.2 t)
- Water cap.: 6,000 imp gal (27,300 L)
- Firebox
  - Type: Round-top
  - Grate area: 45 sq ft (4.2 m^{2})
- Boiler
  - Pitch: ♠ 8 ft 6 in (2,591 mm) ♥ 8 ft 7 1/2 in (2,629 mm)
  - Diameter: 5 ft 10 1/4 in (1,784 mm)
  - Tube plates: 17 ft 10 5/8 in (5,451 mm)
  - Small tubes: 181: 2 in (51 mm)
  - Large tubes: 30: 5 3/8 in (137 mm)
- Boiler pressure: ♠ 195 psi (1,344 kPa) ♥ 205 psi (1,413 kPa)
- Safety valve: Pop
- Heating surface
  - Firebox: 164 sq ft (15.2 m^{2})
  - Tubes: 2,453 sq ft (227.9 m^{2})
  - Arch tubes: 22 sq ft (2.0 m^{2})
  - Total surface: 2,639 sq ft (245.2 m^{2})
- Superheater
  - Heating area: 593 sq ft (55.1 m^{2})
- Cylinders: Two
- Cylinder size: ♣ 22 in (559 mm) bore ♦ 23 in (584 mm) bore ♣♦ 26 in (660 mm) stroke
- Valve gear: Walschaerts
- Valve type: Piston
- Couplers: Johnston link-and-pin AAR knuckle (1930s)
Performance figures
- Tractive effort: ♠♣ 30,670 lbf (136.4 kN) @ 75% ♠♦ 33,530 lbf (149.1 kN) @ 75% ♥♣ 30,710 lbf (136.6 kN) @ 75% ♥♦ 33,570 lbf (149.3 kN) @ 75%
Career
- Operators: South African Railways
- Class: Class 16D
- Number in class: 7
- Numbers: 860–866
- Nicknames: Big Bertha
- Delivered: 1925–1926
- First run: 1925
- Withdrawn: 1972

The South African Railways Class 16D 4-6-2 of 1925 was a steam locomotive.

In 1925, the South African Railways placed two American-built Class 16D locomotives with a 4-6-2 Pacific type wheel arrangement in passenger train service. Five more of these locomotives were ordered and placed in service in 1926.

== Manufacturer ==
On 15 December 1924, after an official tour of investigation to the United States of America by G.E. Titren, the Superintendent Motive Power of the South African Railways (SAR), an order was placed with the Baldwin Locomotive Works of Philadelphia for four experimental locomotives, two of which were of a 4-6-2 Pacific type wheel arrangement. These locomotives were all delivered in 1925. The two Pacifics were designated Class 16D and numbered 860 and 861.

The two Mountain types, which arrived from the same builders in the same shipment, were designated Class 15C. The Classes 16D and 15C were specially designed for working the Union Limited (Johannesburg to Cape Town) and Union Express (Cape Town to Johannesburg) passenger trains, the forerunners of the Blue Train.

== Characteristics ==
These locomotives conformed to SAR requirements as far as practicable but also incorporated the latest American railway engineering practices. The engines introduced several features which were new to the SAR at the time, such as top feeds to the boiler, self-cleaning smokeboxes, Sellar's drifting valves, and grease lubrication to the coupled wheel axle boxes, crank pins and connecting rod big ends.

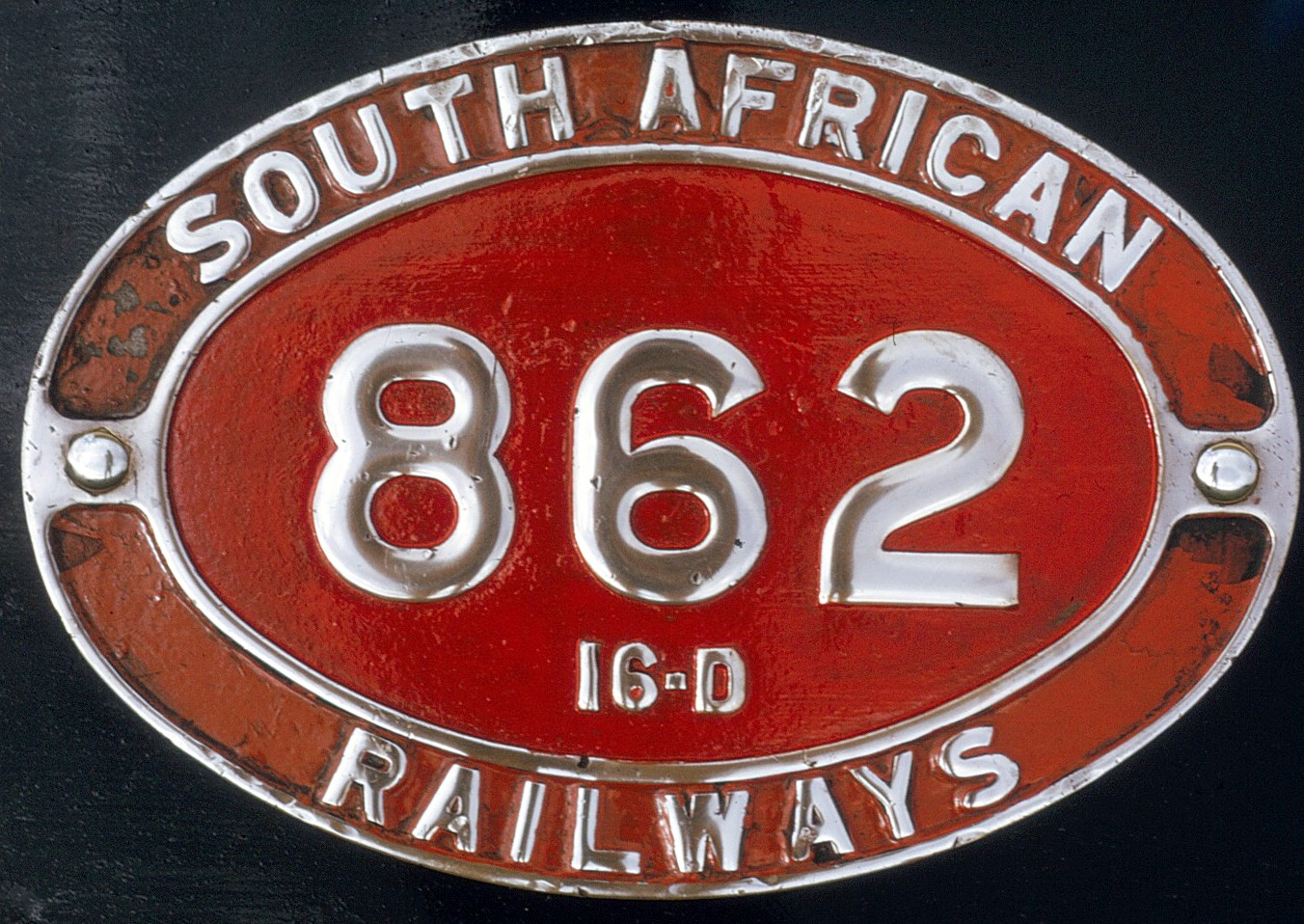

The locomotive's size quickly earned it the nickname Big Bertha, while its contemporary Class 15C locomotive was nicknamed Big Bill. The first two Pacifics were followed by another five locomotives from the same manufacturer in 1926, numbered in the range from 862 to 866.

They had 5 inches (127 millimetres) thick bar frames, which extended from the front buffer beam to the rear dragbox. The boilers were equipped with three Coale pop type safety valves and Schmidt type superheaters. Their fireboxes were equipped with flexible side stays and water siphon arch tubes to support the brick arch and to improve circulation. Their Type KT tenders, arranged with self-trimming type coal bunkers, had a coal capacity of 14 long tons (14.2 tonnes) and a water capacity of 6,000 imperial gallons (27,300 litres) which was considered sufficient for the engines to travel 100 miles (161 kilometres) without having to replenish water.

== Modifications ==
Considerable improvements were effected on the Class 16D after they entered service. The first modification was to their cylinders, which were reamed from a bore of 22 to 23 inches (559 to 584 millimetres). During 1941, all seven engines had their coupled wheels retyred from 60 to 63 inches (1,520 to 1,600 millimetres) diameter. To compensate for the loss of tractive effort due to the larger diameter wheels, their operating boiler pressure was increased from 195 to 205 pounds per square inch (1,340 to 1,410 kilopascals) by an adjustment of the setting of their safety valves.

When larger tyres were fitted, the old tyres were left in position and turned down on the wheel centres to serve as liners and the new tyres were then shrunk on over the liners. The practice of increasing the diameter of coupled wheels, wheel spacing and other considerations permitting, was begun by A.G. Watson during his term in office as Chief Mechanical Engineer and was continued by his successors. The reduction of tractive effort caused by the larger wheels was made up by increasing boiler pressures or by fitting larger cylinders or both, as required. This practice resulted in more mileage between heavy repairs, less cost-per-mile on repairs and locomotives capable of higher speeds.

In the Western Cape, wheatland fires caused by locomotives were a huge problem for farmers as well as for the SAR who had to pay out the claims. In the late 1960s Johannes Barnard, the assistant locomotive superintendent at Cape Town, invented a self-cleaning smokebox and a way to blow char out of the smokebox when the engine was standing in non-sensitive places such as at water stops. While on the run, excess char was diverted into a box mounted below the smokebox door. The consensus among railwaymen at the time was that these modifications were not entirely effective, but they remained in use for at least ten years nonetheless.

== Service ==
The introduction of these large engines, along with their Class 15C 4-8-2 Mountain type Big Bill siblings, resulted in a complete revision of traffic operation between Cape Town and Johannesburg. The Pacifics were scheduled to work the 616 miles (991 kilometres) stretch between Johannesburg and Beaufort West while the Big Bill Mountains entered service on the 340 miles (547 kilometres) stretch from Beaufort West to Cape Town with its ruling gradient of 1 in 40 (2½%) and severe curvature for approximately 22 miles (35 kilometres) on the Hex River Railpass section between Touws River and De Doorns.

On Thursday 13 August 1925, Big Bertha no. 860 made locomotive history by hauling the Union Limited, later to become the Blue Train, over a distance of 956 miles (1,539 kilometres) from Johannesburg to Cape Town in 29 hours. On the return journey, no. 860 took the Union Express over from Big Bill no. 2060 at Beaufort West and hauled it all the way back to Johannesburg.

This continuous run by one locomotive set up a world record. Prior to this, it was customary to use three engines on the Cape Town run of these two named trains with engine changes at Kimberley and Beaufort West. On ordinary trains, up to six locomotives were often used with engine changes at Klerksdorp, Kimberley, De Aar, Beaufort West and Touws River.

Upon the arrival of larger locomotives, the Class 16D was later transferred to Bloemfontein in the Orange Free State, from where they worked north to Johannesburg. In 1939 they were relocated to Cape Town from where they hauled fast local commuter trains to Wellington and Malmesbury for the remainder of their careers. The Klawer Mail passenger train from Cape Town was one of the last reasonably respectable duties for the Baldwin Pacifics. By 1971, the days of the Class 16D in passenger service were numbered and service on goods trains and pick-up workings predominated. They were withdrawn from service in 1972.

== Preservation ==
Number	Works nmr	THF / Private	Leaselend / Owner	Current Location	Outside South Africa	?
860	BALDWIN 58309	THF	Baysteamers	Cape Town		

== Illustration ==
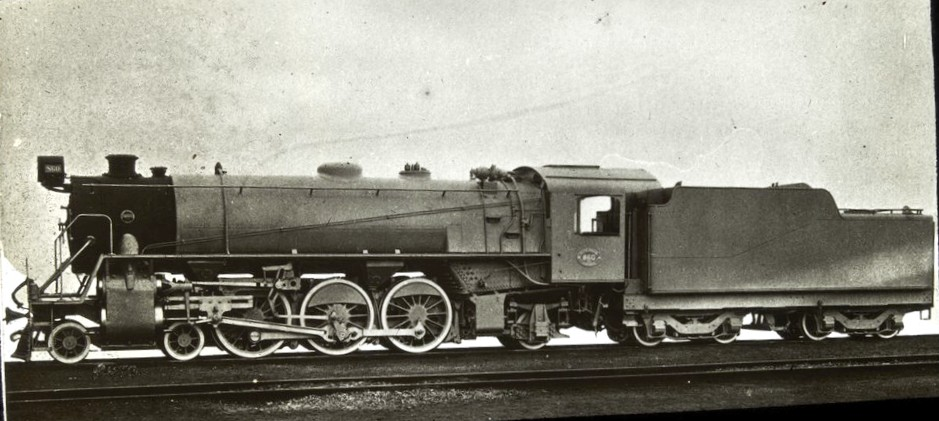
Big Bertha no. 860, as delivered with Johnston link-and-pin couplers, c. 1925

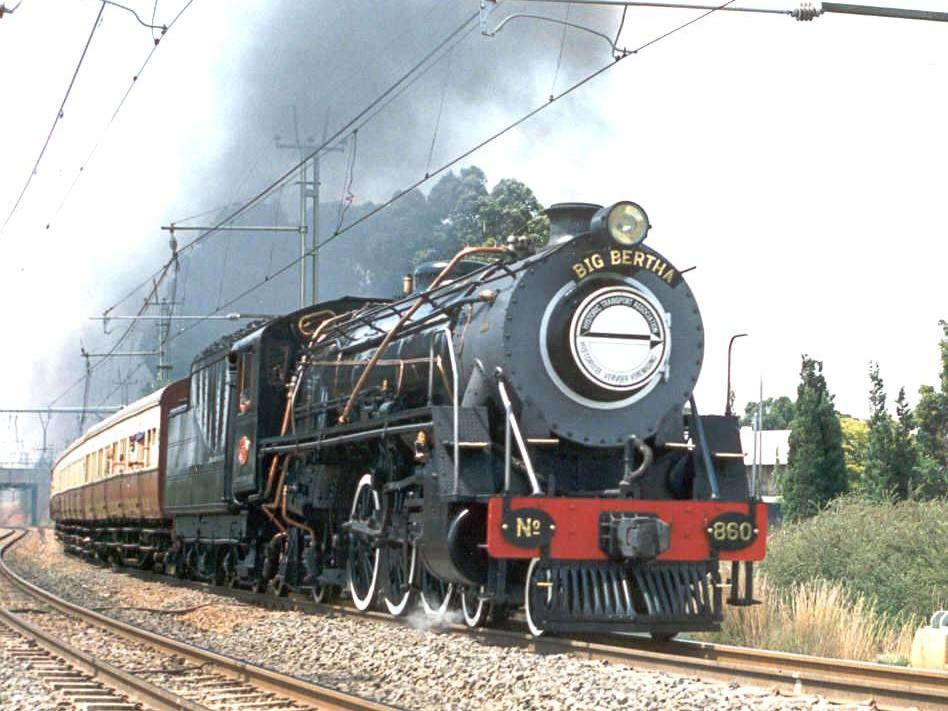
No. 860 on the Magaliesburg line, c. 1992

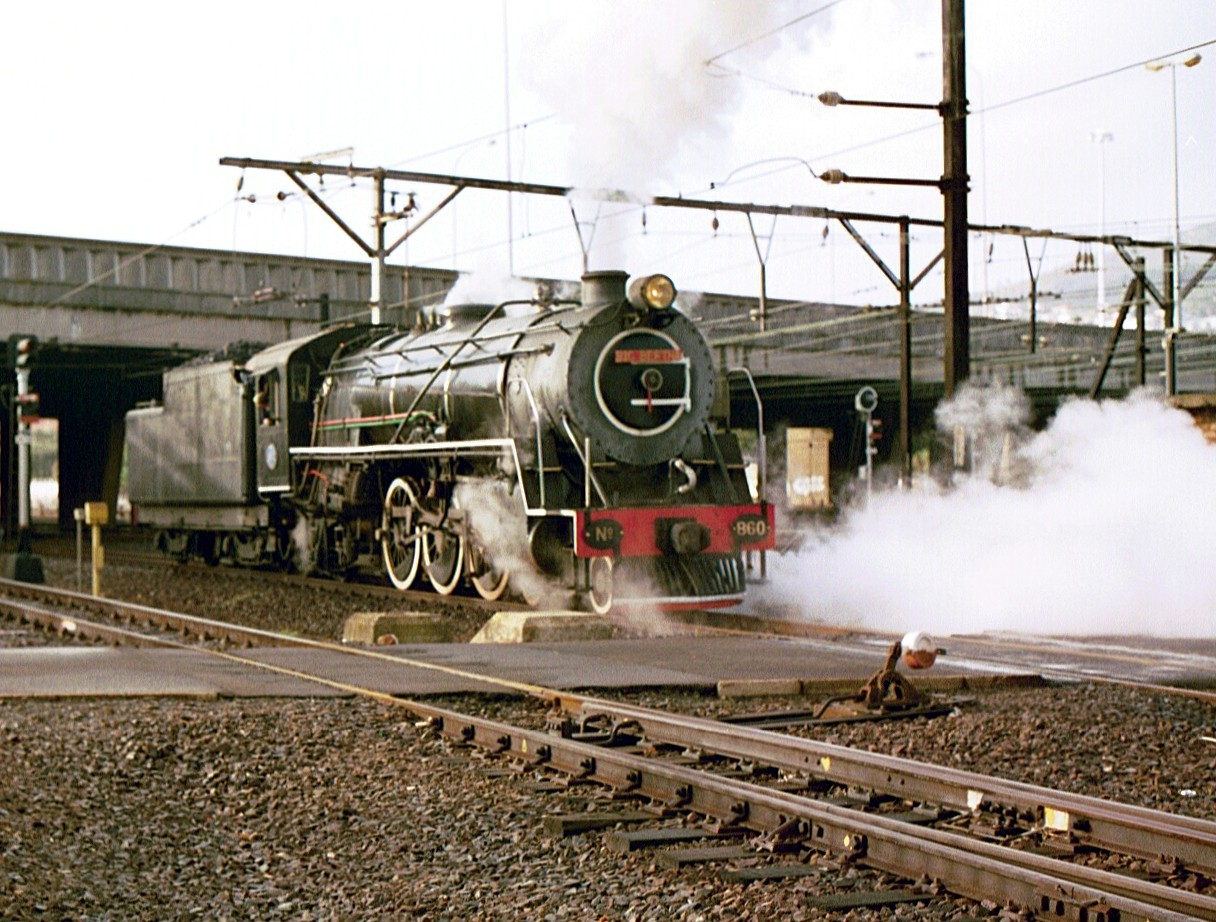
No. 860 at Monument station, May 2002
