= South African Class 16DA 4-6-2 1930 =

1930 design of steam locomotive

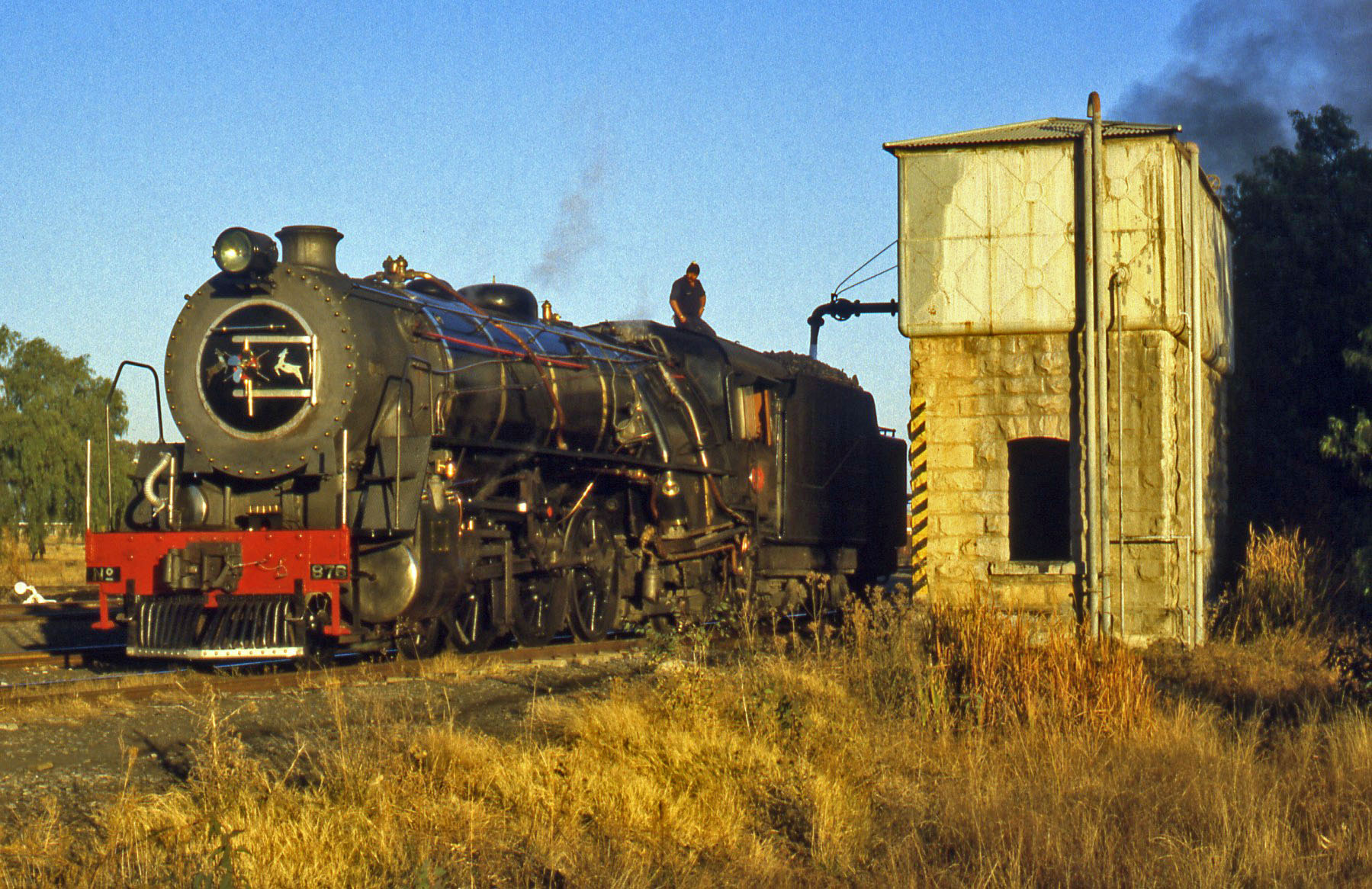
- No. 876 taking water at Thaba Nchu, 4 July 1999
Type and origin
- ♠ With 60 inch (1,524 mm) coupled wheels ♥ With 63 inch (1,600 mm) coupled wheels
- Power type: Steam
- Designer: South African Railways (A.G. Watson)
- Builder: Henschel and Son
- Serial number: 21749-21754
- Model: Class 16DA
- Build date: 1930
- Total produced: 6
Specifications
- Configuration
  - Whyte: 4-6-2 (Pacific)
  - UIC: 2'C1'h2
- Driver: 2nd coupled axle
- Gauge: 3 ft 6 in (1,067 mm) Cape gauge
- Leading dia.: 30 in (762 mm)
- Coupled dia.: ♠ 60 in (1,524 mm) ♥ 63 in (1,600 mm)
- Trailing dia.: 34 in (864 mm)
- Tender wheels: 34 in (864 mm)
- Wheelbase: 60 ft 3 1/4 in (18,371 mm)
  - Engine: 30 ft 8 in (9,347 mm)
  - Leading: 6 ft 10 in (2,083 mm)
  - Coupled: 11 ft (3,353 mm)
  - Tender: 20 ft 5 in (6,223 mm)
  - Tender bogie: 6 ft 2 in (1,880 mm)
- Length
  - Over couplers: 68 ft 4 1/8 in (20,831 mm)
- Height: ♠ 12 ft 10 in (3,912 mm) ♥ 12 ft 11 1/2 in (3,950 mm)
- Frame type: Bar
- Axle load: ♠ 19 LT 10 cwt (19,810 kg) ♥ 19 LT 15 cwt 1 qtr (20,080 kg)
  - Leading: ♠♥ 17 LT 7 cwt (17,630 kg)
  - 1st coupled: ♠ 19 LT 10 cwt (19,810 kg) ♥ 19 LT 15 cwt 1 qtr (20,080 kg)
  - 2nd coupled: ♠ 19 LT 7 cwt 3 qtr (19,700 kg) ♥ 19 LT 13 cwt (19,970 kg)
  - 3rd coupled: ♠ 19 LT 2 cwt (19,410 kg) ♥ 19 LT 7 cwt 1 qtr (19,670 kg)
  - Trailing: ♠♥ 15 LT 18 cwt (16,160 kg)
  - Tender bogie: Bogie 1: 33 LT 18 cwt (34,440 kg); Bogie 2: 35 LT 10 cwt (36,070 kg)
  - Tender axle: 17 LT 15 cwt (18,030 kg)
- Adhesive weight: ♠ 57 LT 19 cwt 3 qtr (58,920 kg) ♥ 58 LT 15 cwt 2 qtr (59,720 kg)
- Loco weight: ♠ 91 LT 4 cwt 3 qtr (92,700 kg) ♥ 92 LT 0 cwt 2 qtr (93,500 kg)
- Tender weight: 69 LT 8 cwt (70,510 kg)
- Total weight: ♠ 160 LT 12 cwt 3 qtr (163,200 kg) ♥ 161 LT 8 cwt 2 qtr (164,000 kg)
- Tender type: KT (2-axle bogies)
- Fuel type: Coal
- Fuel capacity: 14 LT (14.2 t)
- Water cap.: 6,000 imp gal (27,300 L)
- Firebox
  - Type: Round-top
  - Grate area: 60 sq ft (5.6 m^{2})
- Boiler
  - Pitch: ♠ 8 ft 6 in (2,591 mm) ♥ 8 ft 7 1/2 in (2,629 mm)
  - Diameter: 5 ft 10 1/4 in (1,784 mm)
  - Tube plates: 17 ft 10 5/8 in (5,451 mm)
  - Small tubes: 142: 2 1/4 in (57 mm)
  - Large tubes: 34: 5 1/2 in (140 mm)
- Boiler pressure: ♠ 195 psi (1,344 kPa) ♥ 205 psi (1,413 kPa)
- Safety valve: Pop
- Heating surface
  - Firebox: 172 sq ft (16.0 m^{2})
  - Tubes: 2,371 sq ft (220.3 m^{2})
  - Arch tubes: 22 sq ft (2.0 m^{2})
  - Total surface: 2,565 sq ft (238.3 m^{2})
- Superheater
  - Heating area: 620 sq ft (58 m^{2})
- Cylinders: Two
- Cylinder size: 23 in (584 mm) bore 26 in (660 mm) stroke
- Valve gear: Walschaerts; Caprotti (No. 879 as built)
- Valve type: Piston; Poppet (No. 879 as built)
- Couplers: AAR knuckle
Performance figures
- Tractive effort: ♠ 33,530 lbf (149.1 kN) @ 75% ♥ 33,570 lbf (149.3 kN) @ 75%
Career
- Operators: South African Railways
- Class: Class 16DA
- Number in class: 6
- Numbers: 874-879
- Nicknames: Boepens, Wide firebox
- Delivered: 1930
- First run: 1930
- Withdrawn: 1973
- Disposition: 6 preserved, remainder scrapped

The South African Railways Class 16DA 4-6-2 of 1930 is a class of steam locomotives.

In 1930, the South African Railways placed six redesigned Class 16DA steam locomotives with a 4-6-2 Pacific type wheel arrangement in passenger train service.

== Manufacturer ==
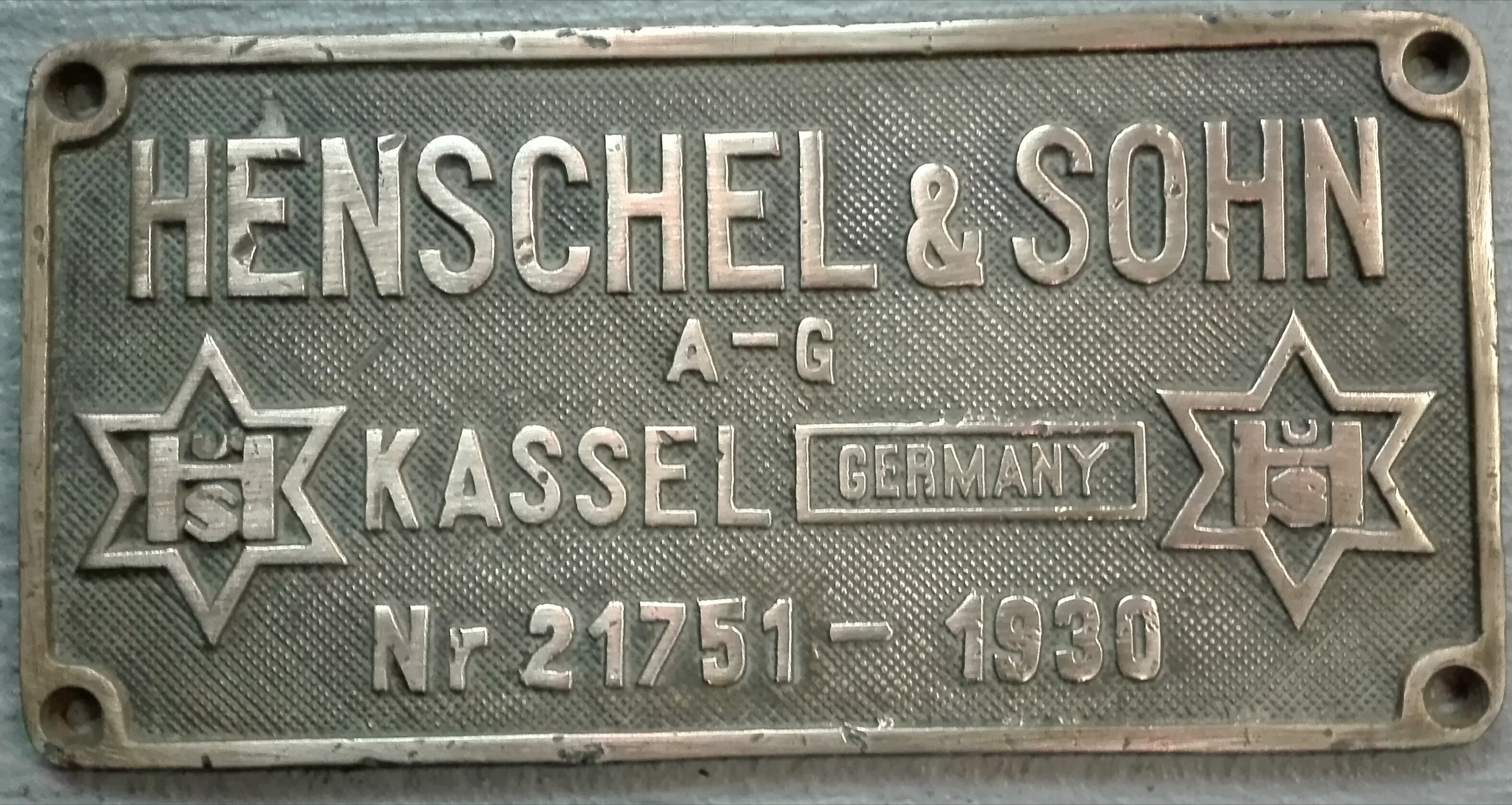
16Da 876 Builders Plate

An order for six locomotives for the South African Railways (SAR), similar to the Class 16DA Pacific type locomotives of 1928 and 1929 but built to an improved design, was placed with Henschel and Son of Kassel in Germany in 1930.

== Characteristics ==
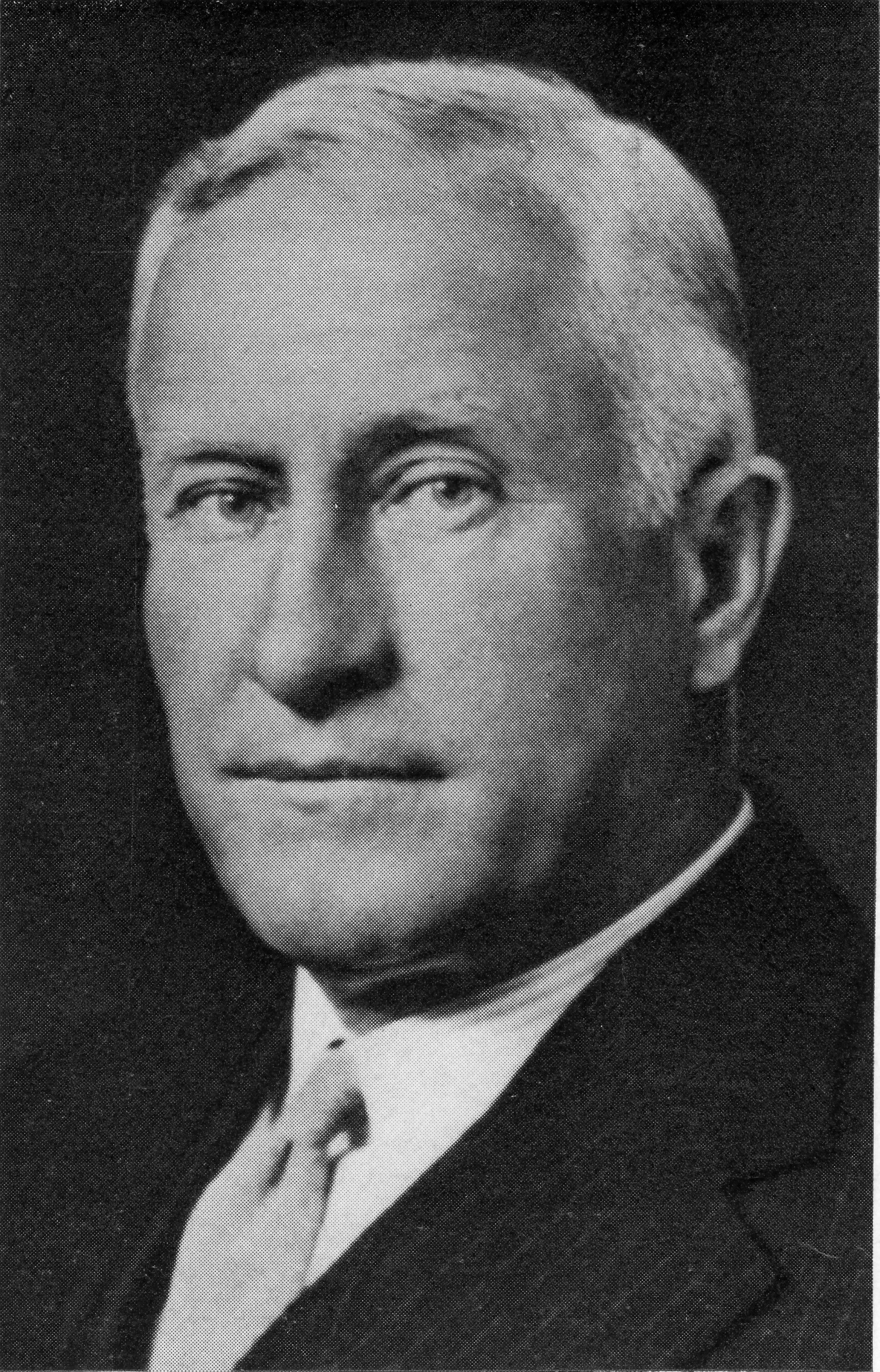
A.G. Watson

In an attempt to improve the steaming properties of further orders of Class 16DA locomotives, A.G. Watson, who had succeeded Colonel Collins as CME in 1929, designed a boiler of the Wootten type. It had a very wide firebox with a grate area of 60 square feet (5.574 square metres). Watson was a firm believer in large firegrates with enlarged blast pipe caps to give a reasonably low burning rate of fuel per unit of grate area, which improved boiler efficiency and reduced the emission of sparks and partially burnt fuel.

The boiler itself was of the same dimensions as that of the earlier locomotives in terms of girth and length between tube plates, the only difference being in the tube arrangement. The enlarged firebox, however, had a firegrate area which was 33⅓% larger than the 45 square feet (4.181 square metres) of the earlier Hohenzollern- and Baldwin-built locomotives. It was of comparable proportions to those which would later be installed on the Class 15E and Class 23.

This boiler and firebox was installed on these final six Class 16DA locomotives, numbered in the range from 874 to 879, which were built by Henschel and delivered in 1930. Compared to the earlier Hohenzollern- and Baldwin-built locomotives, the steaming ability of the six Henschel-built locomotives was phenomenal and led to the adoption of wide fireboxes without combustion chambers as the standard on all subsequent SAR mainline steam locomotives.

The Henschel-built Class 16DA locomotives with their much wider fireboxes, their correspondingly larger grate areas and slightly larger diameter trailing wheels were sufficiently different from the Baldwin- and Hohenzollern-builts to justify a separate classification such as Class 16DB, but this did not happen and the locomotives ended up being known as the Wide Firebox or Boepens Class 16DA.

== Modifications ==
Five of these locomotives were delivered with Walschaerts valve gear. The last engine, no. 879, was built with Caprotti valve gear for experimental purposes. This rotary poppet valve gear was driven from a single gearbox on the centre of the driving axle. The valve gear was given a fair trial, but was eventually replaced with the standard Walschaerts valve gear in 1940.

They were all delivered with 60 inches (1,520 millimetres) diameter coupled wheels and with their boiler operating pressure set at 195 pounds per square inch (1,340 kilopascals). Four of them were later retyred with 63 inches (1,600 millimetres) diameter tyres on their coupled wheels. At the same time, their operating boiler pressure was raised to 205 pounds per square inch (1,410 kilopascals) to not have their tractive effort reduced by the larger coupled wheels.

When the larger tyres were fitted, the old tyres were left in position and turned down on the wheel centres to serve as liners and the new tyres were then shrunk on over the liners. The practice of increasing the diameter of coupled wheels, wheel spacing and other considerations permitting, was begun by A.G. Watson during his term in office and was continued by his successors. The reduction of tractive effort caused by the larger wheels was made up by increasing boiler pressures or by fitting larger cylinders or both, as required. This policy resulted in more mileage between heavy repairs, less cost-per-mile on repairs and locomotives capable of higher speeds.

== Service ==
The locomotives were placed in service at Kimberley and took over the working of the Union Limited and Union Express between there and Johannesburg from the narrow firebox Class 16DA. They were never stationed at Braamfontein Loco in Johannesburg, but were serviced there in the process of working between Kimberley and Johannesburg. They also worked south from Kimberley to Beaufort West.

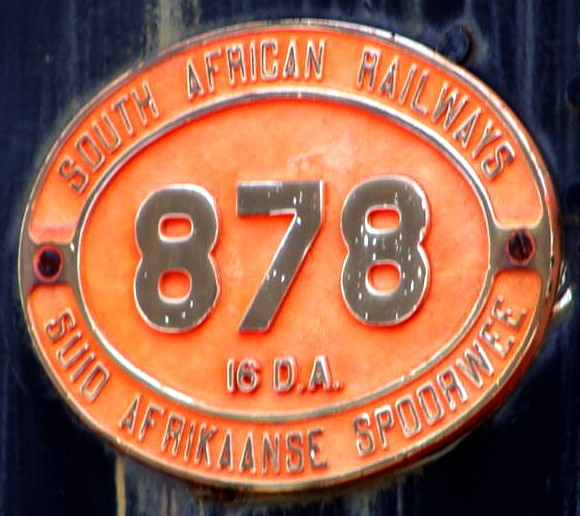

When the Class 16E arrived in 1935, these Class 16DAs remained in service on the express trains in company with the new locomotives which were also stationed at Kimberley and also worked north to Johannesburg and south to Beaufort West.

When new air-conditioned rolling stock was placed in service on the Union Limited and Union Express services between Cape Town and Johannesburg in 1939 to 1940, all the Class 16DA and Class 16E locomotives were transferred to Bloemfontein in the Free State. From here, they continued to work passenger trains north and south, including the Orange Express which was the premier passenger train passing through Bloemfontein. During the 1950s the Orange Express was worked almost exclusively by wide firebox Class 16DA and Class 16E locomotives between Bloemfontein and Kimberley. When the Class 15F replaced them, they were relegated to suburban and local passenger train work. The wide firebox Class 16DA were withdrawn from service in 1973.

== Preservation ==
| Number | Works number | THF / Private | Leaselend / Owner | Current Location |
|---|---|---|---|---|
| 848 | BALDWIN 60255 | Private | Wanki Collery | Main Road |
| 850 | BALDWIN 60827 | Private | Theunissen Municipality | Main Street |
| 870 | HOHENZOLLERN 4655 | THF | | Krugersdorp Locomotive Depot |
| 876 | HENSC 21751 | THF | Transnet Heritage Foundation (Museum) | Bloemfontein Locomotive Depot |
| 878 | HENSC 21753 | THF | Transnet Engineering | Bloemfontein Locomotive Depot |
| 879 | HENSC 21754 | THF | Ceres Railway Company | Cape Town Station |

== Works numbers ==
The table lists the Class 16DA engine numbers, works numbers and variations in coupled wheel sizes.

Class 16DA 4-6-2 Works Numbers & Variations
| SAR No. | Works No. | Coupled wheel dia. |
|---|---|---|
| 874 | 21749 | 63"/1600mm |
| 875 | 21750 | 63"/1600mm |
| 876 | 21751 | 60"/1524mm |
| 877 | 21752 | 60"/1524mm |
| 878 | 21753 | 63"/1600mm |
| 879 | 21754 | 63"/1600mm |

== Illustration ==
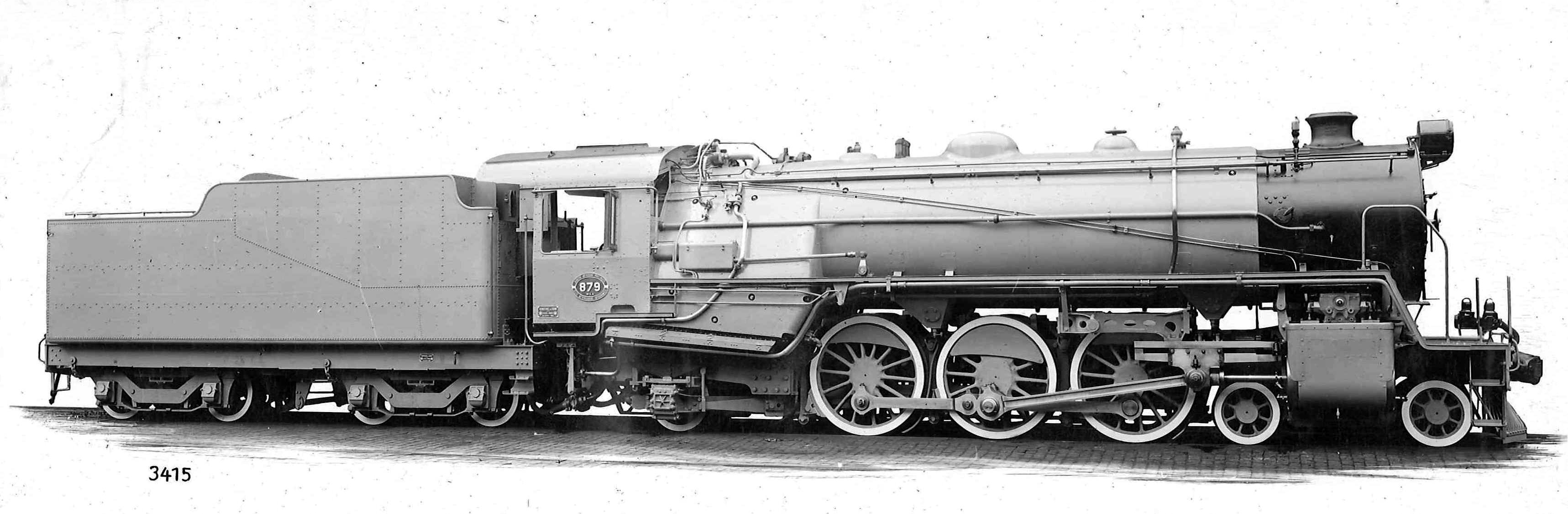
No. 879 as built with Caprotti valve gear

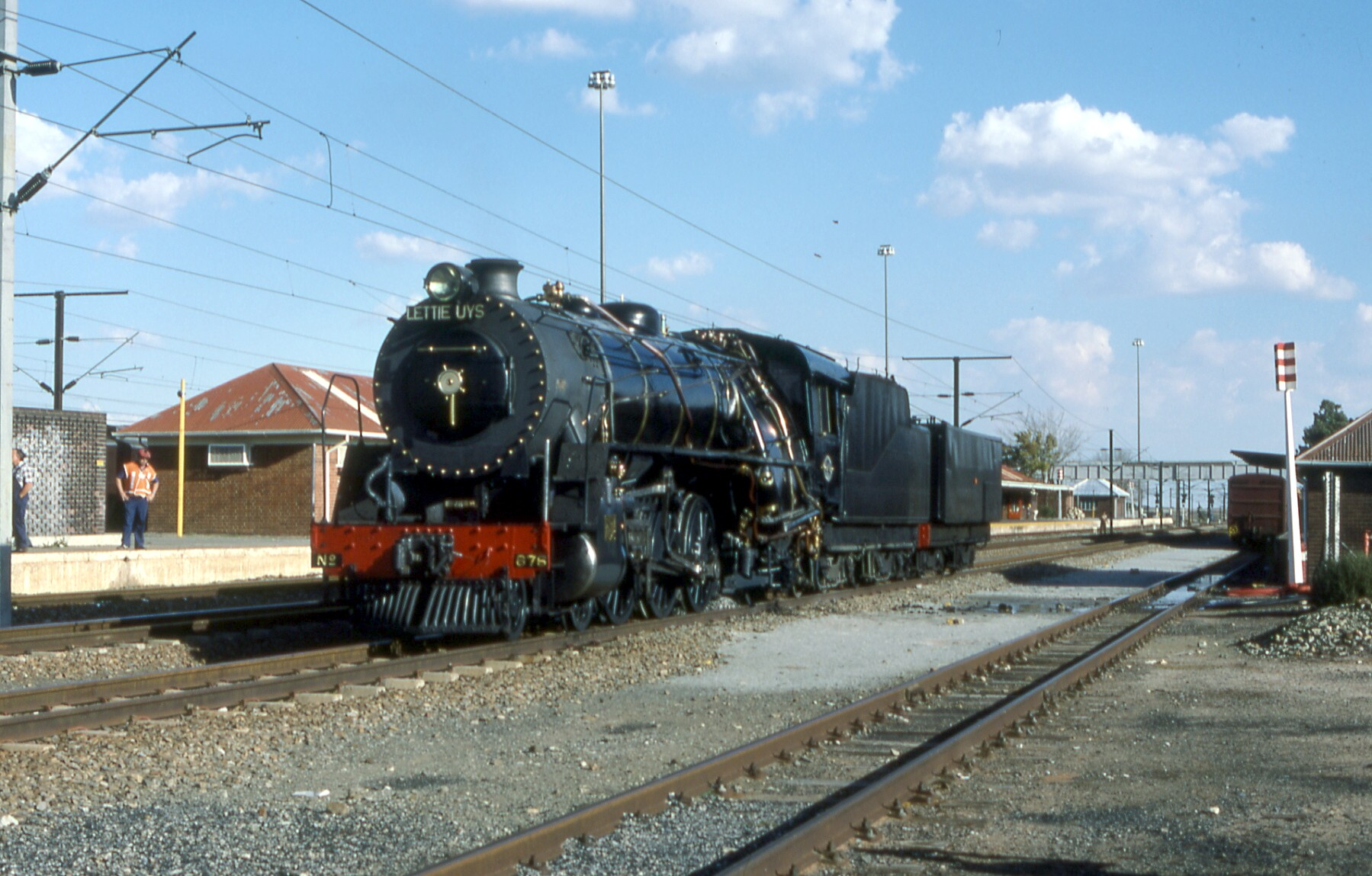
No. 876 Lettie Uys at Springfontein, c. 1991

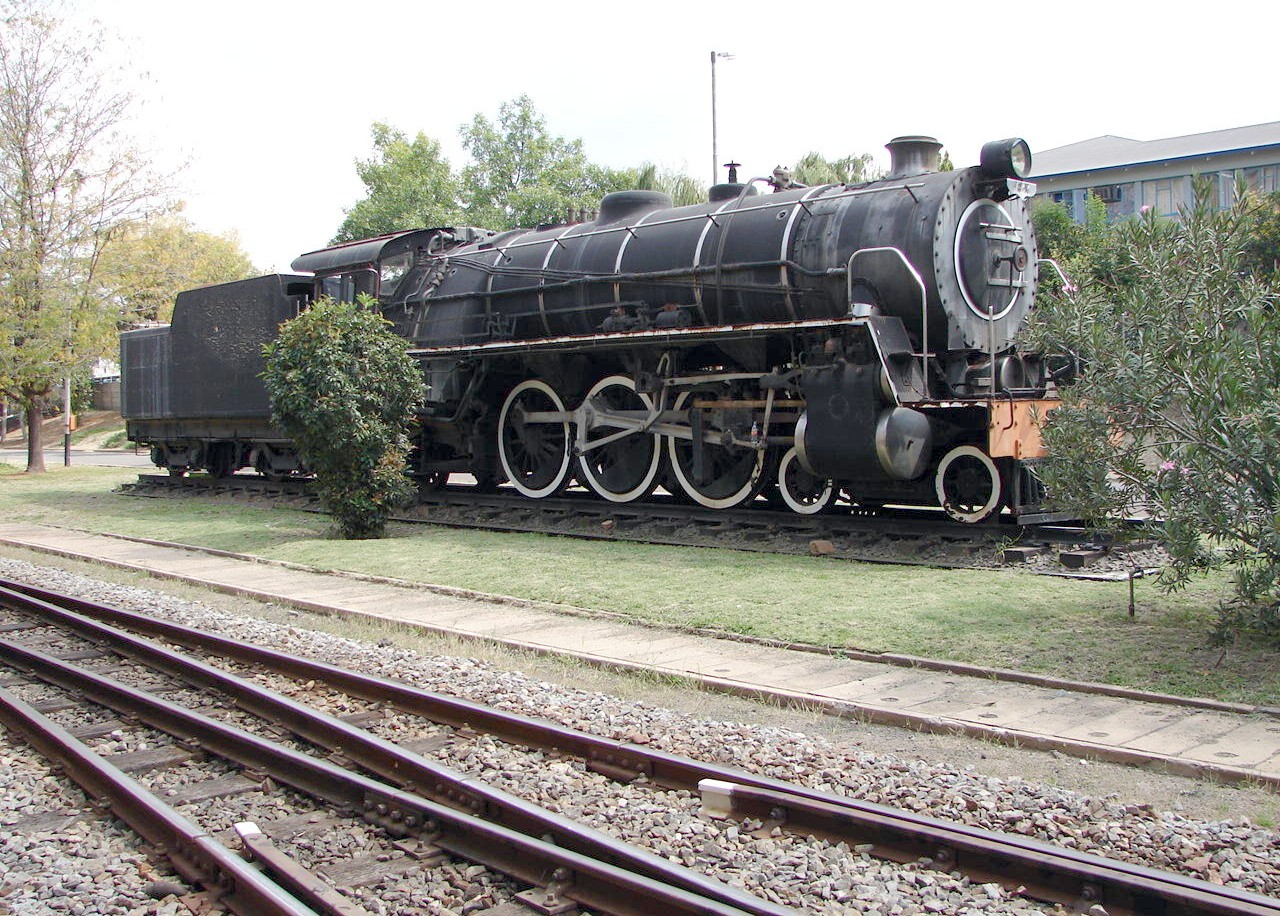
No. 878 at the Bloemfontein shops, 7 April 2006

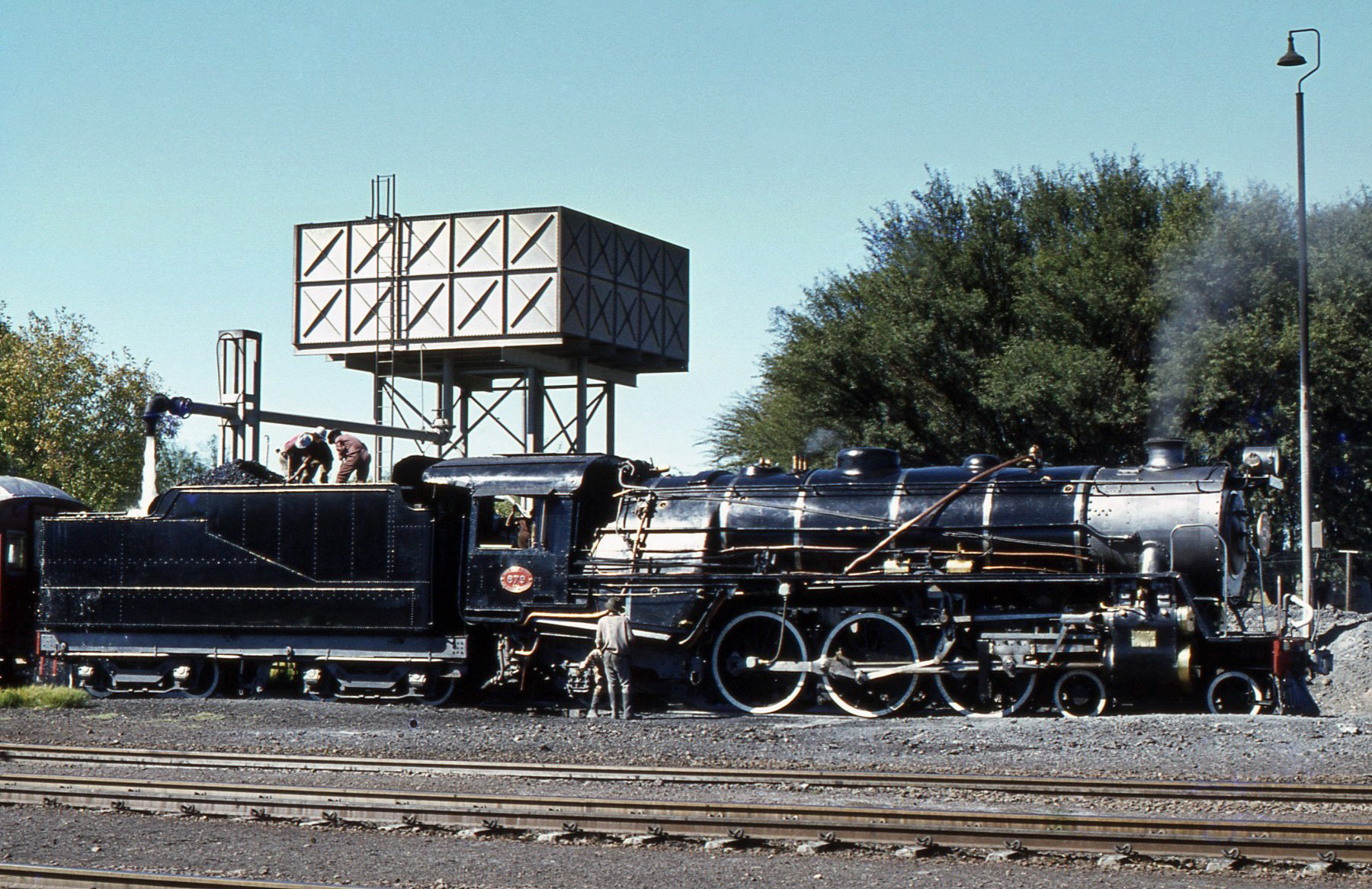
No. 879 at Oranjerivier, 13 April 1979

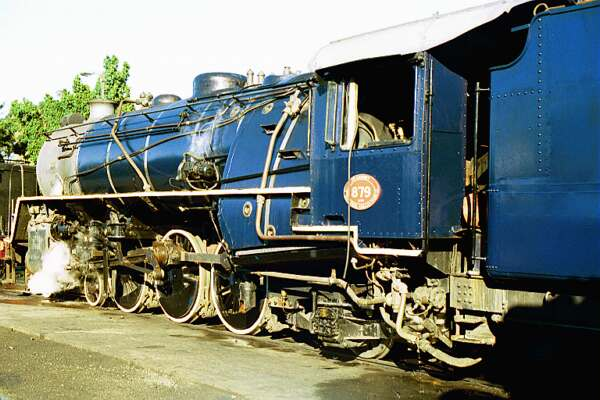
No. 879 in dark blue Union Limited livery, c. 2002
