= South African Class 16CR 4-6-2 =

South African Class 16CR 4-6-2 may refer to one of the following steam locomotive classes that were reclassified to Class 16CR after being reboilered with Watson Standard no. 2B boilers:

- South African Class 16B 4-6-2
- South African Class 16C 4-6-2
