= South African Class 16C 4-6-2 =

1919 design of steam locomotive

South African Class 16C & 16CR 4-6-2
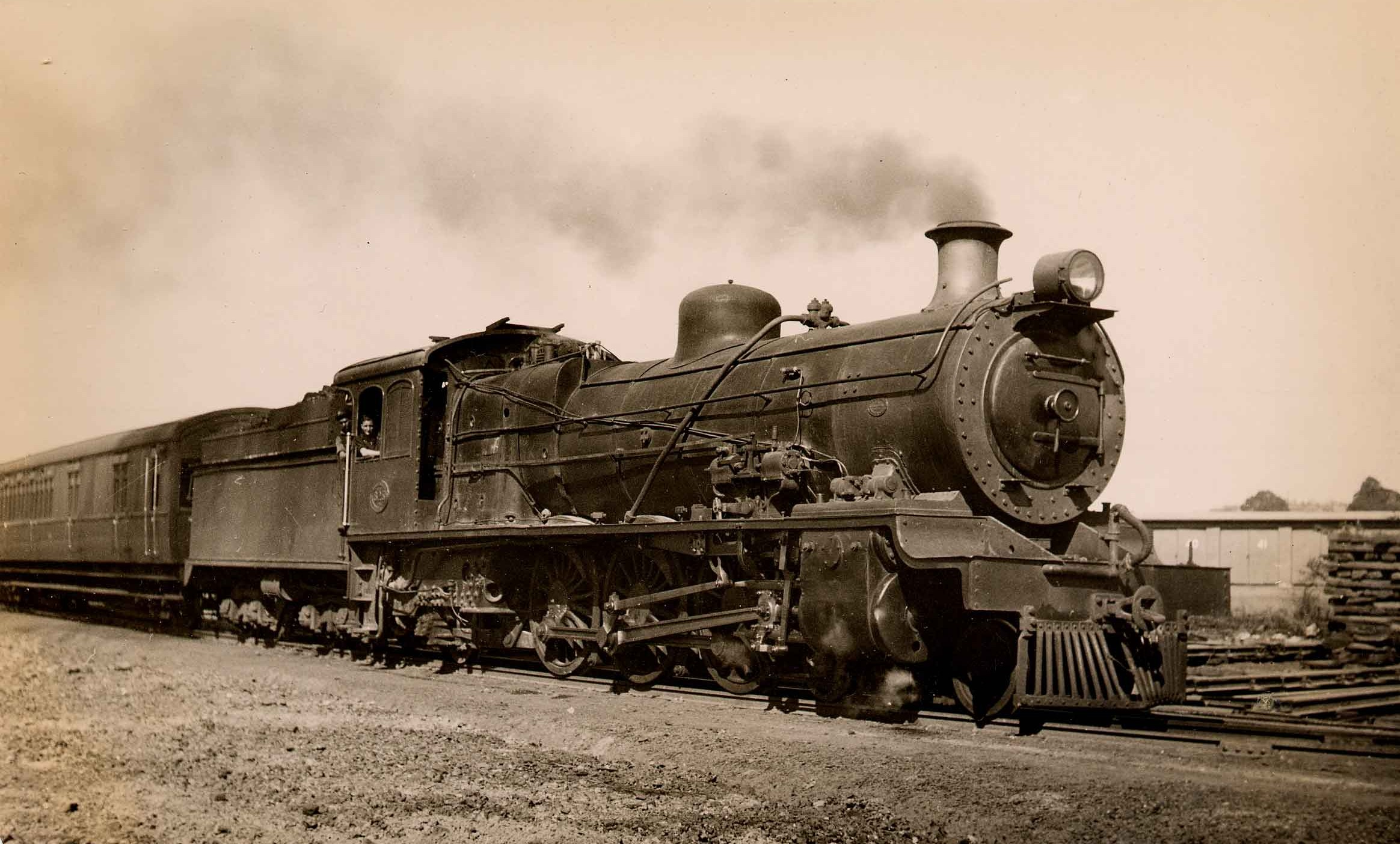
- Class 16C no. 825, as built, with Belpaire firebox
Type and origin
- ♠ Class 16C as built with a Belpaire firebox ♥ Class 16CR rebuilt with a Watson Standard boiler ʘ Larger 63 inch coupled wheels ♣ Steel firebox – ♦ Copper firebox
- Power type: Steam
- Designer: South African Railways (D. A. Hendrie)
- Builder: North British Locomotive Company
- Serial number: 21708-21717 (812-821); 22716-22735 (822-841)
- Model: Class 16C
- Build date: 1919–1922
- Total produced: 30
Specifications
- Configuration
  - Whyte: 4-6-2 (Pacific)
  - UIC: 2'C1'h2
- Driver: 2nd coupled axle
- Gauge: 3 ft 6 in (1,067 mm) Cape gauge
- Leading dia.: 30 in (762 mm)
- Coupled dia.: ♠♥ 60 in (1,524 mm) ʘ 63 in (1,600 mm)
- Trailing dia.: 33 in (838 mm)
- Tender wheels: 34 in (864 mm)
- Wheelbase: 55 ft 11 3/4 in (17,062 mm)
  - Engine: 29 ft 5 1/2 in (8,979 mm)
  - Leading: 6 ft 2 in (1,880 mm)
  - Coupled: 10 ft 9 in (3,277 mm)
  - Tender: 16 ft 9 in (5,105 mm)
  - Tender bogie: 4 ft 7 in (1,397 mm)
- Length
  - Over couplers: 64 ft 4 1/8 in (19,612 mm)
- Height: ♠ 12 ft 10 in (3,912 mm) ʘ 12 ft 11 1/2 in (3,950 mm) ♥ 12 ft 11 1/4 in (3,943 mm)
- Frame type: Plate
- Axle load: ♠♥ 17 LT 14 cwt (17,980 kg) ʘ 18 LT 3 cwt (18,440 kg)
  - Leading: ♠ʘ 16 LT 1 cwt (16,310 kg) ♥ 16 LT 12 cwt (16,870 kg)
  - Coupled: ♠ 17 LT 14 cwt (17,980 kg)
  - 1st coupled: ʘ 18 LT 1 cwt (18,340 kg) ♥ 17 LT 11 cwt (17,830 kg)
  - 2nd coupled: ʘ 18 LT 3 cwt (18,440 kg) ♠♥ 17 LT 14 cwt (17,980 kg)
  - 3rd coupled: ʘ 18 LT 1 cwt (18,340 kg) ♥ 17 LT 11 cwt (17,830 kg)
  - Trailing: ♠ʘ 13 LT 4 cwt (13,410 kg) ♥ 13 LT 7 cwt (13,560 kg)
  - Tender bogie: Bogie 1: 27 LT 10 cwt (27,940 kg); Bogie 2: 23 LT 11 cwt (23,930 kg)
  - Tender axle: 13 LT 15 cwt (13,970 kg)
- Adhesive weight: ♠ 53 LT 2 cwt (53,950 kg) ʘ 54 LT 5 cwt (55,120 kg) ♥ 52 LT 16 cwt (53,650 kg)
- Loco weight: ♠ 82 LT 7 cwt (83,670 kg) ʘ 83 LT 10 cwt (84,840 kg) ♥ 82 LT 15 cwt (84,080 kg)
- Tender weight: 51 LT 1 cwt (51,870 kg)
- Total weight: ♠ 133 LT 8 cwt (135,500 kg) ʘ 134 LT 11 cwt (136,700 kg) ♥ 133 LT 16 cwt (135,900 kg)
- Tender type: MP1 (2-axle bogies); MP, MP1, MR, MS, MT, MT1, MT2, MX, MY, MY1 permitted
- Fuel type: Coal
- Fuel capacity: 10 LT (10.2 t)
- Water cap.: 4,250 imp gal (19,300 L)
- Firebox
  - Type: ♠ Belpaire ♥ Round-top
  - Grate area: ♠♥ 37 sq ft (3.4 m^{2})
- Boiler
  - Model: Watson Standard no. 2B
  - Pitch: ♠ 7 ft 9 in (2,362 mm) ʘ 7 ft 10 1/2 in (2,400 mm) ♥ 8 ft (2,438 mm)
  - Diameter: ♠ 5 ft 4 3/8 in (1,635 mm) ♥ 5 ft 7 1/2 in (1,714 mm)
  - Tube plates: ♠ 15 ft 10 1/2 in (4,839 mm) ♥♣ 18 ft 4 in (5,588 mm) ♥♦ 18 ft 3 5/8 in (5,578 mm)
  - Small tubes: ♠ 113: 2 1/4 in (57 mm) ♥ 87: 2 1/2 in (64 mm)
  - Large tubes: ♠ 21: 5 1/2 in (140 mm) ♥ 30: 5 1/2 in (140 mm)
- Boiler pressure: ♠♥ 190 psi (1,310 kPa) ʘ 200 psi (1,379 kPa)
- Safety valve: ♠ Ramsbottom – ♥ Pop
- Heating surface
  - Firebox: ♠ 178 sq ft (16.5 m^{2}) ♥ 142 sq ft (13.2 m^{2})
  - Tubes: ♠ 1,534 sq ft (142.5 m^{2}) ♥ 1,836 sq ft (170.6 m^{2})
  - Total surface: ♠ 1,712 sq ft (159.1 m^{2}) ♥ 1,978 sq ft (183.8 m^{2})
- Superheater
  - Type: Robinson
  - Heating area: ♠ 313 sq ft (29.1 m^{2}) ♥ 472 sq ft (43.9 m^{2})
- Cylinders: Two
- Cylinder size: 22 in (559 mm) bore 26 in (660 mm) stroke
- Valve gear: Walschaerts
- Valve type: Piston
- Couplers: Johnston link-and-pin AAR knuckle (1930s)
Performance figures
- Tractive effort: ♠♥ 29,890 lbf (133.0 kN) @ 75% ʘ 29,960 lbf (133.3 kN) @ 75%
Career
- Operators: South African Railways
- Class: Class 16C & 16CR
- Number in class: 30
- Numbers: 812–841
- Delivered: 1919–1922
- First run: 1919
- Withdrawn: 1976
- As built, the 2nd coupled axle had flangeless wheels

The South African Railways Class 16C 4-6-2 of 1919 was a steam locomotive.

During 1919, the South African Railways placed ten Class 16C steam locomotives with a 4-6-2 Pacific type wheel arrangement in mainline passenger service. Another twenty entered service in 1922. Unlike the earlier Classes 16 and 16B, these locomotives had combustion chambers.

== Manufacturer ==
The Class 16C 4-6-2 Pacific type locomotive was designed by D. A. Hendrie, Chief Mechanical Engineer (CME) of the South African Railways (SAR), and built by the North British Locomotive Company (NBL) in Glasgow, Scotland. Ten locomotives were delivered in 1919, numbered in the range from 812 to 821. A second order followed in 1921 for another twenty locomotives which were numbered in the range from 822 to 841 when they were delivered in 1922.

== Characteristics ==
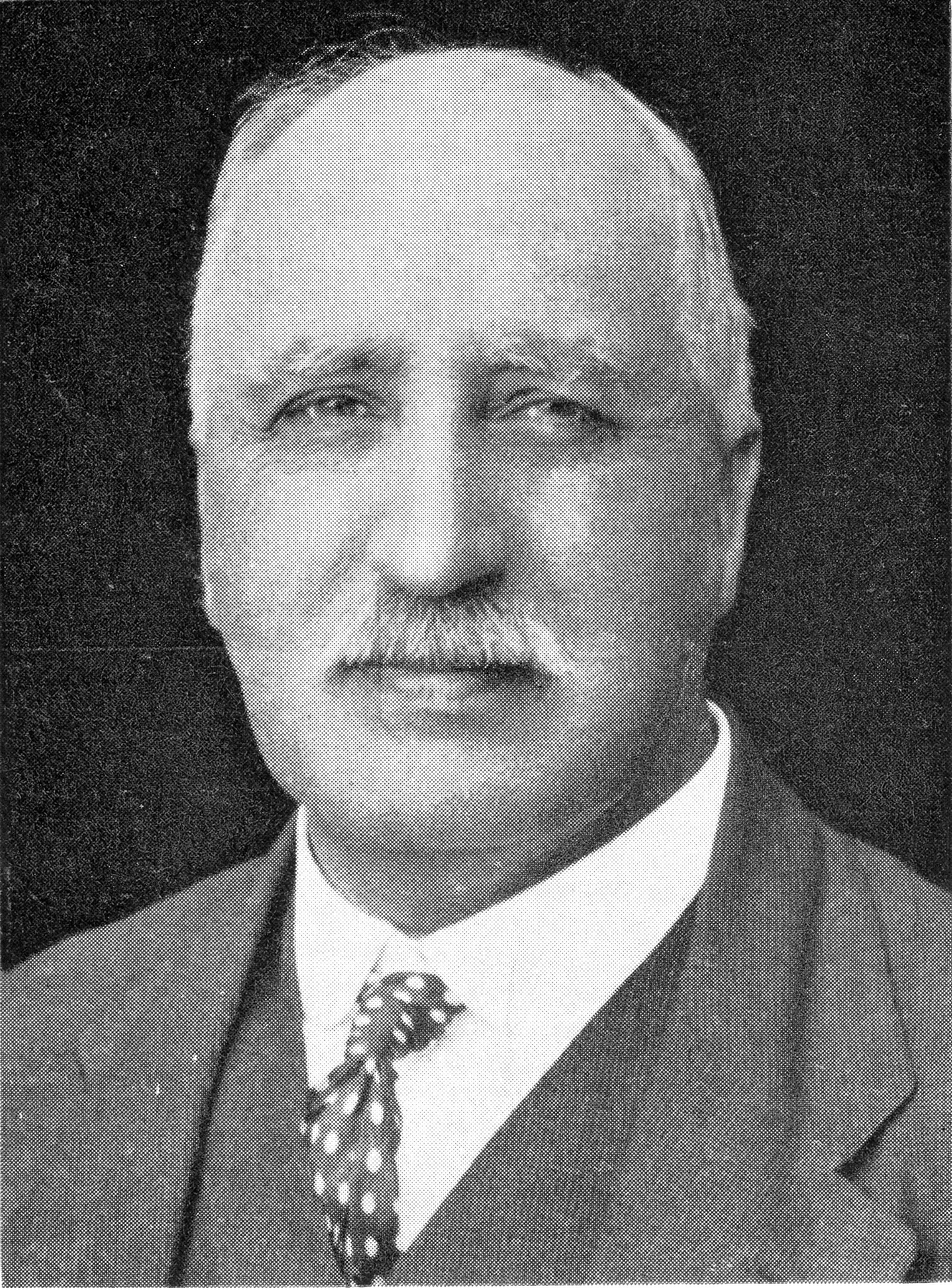
D. A. Hendrie

They were identical to the predecessor Classes 16 and 16B in most respects, except that Hendrie had added a combustion chamber to the boiler, similar to that of the Class 15A. This reduced the distance between tube plates from 18 feet 3 inches (5,563 millimetres) to 15 feet 10 1/2 inches (4,839 millimetres). The presence of the combustion chamber was visible externally as an extension of the Belpaire firebox hump.

The engines were equipped with Lambert sanding gear, which was a "wet" system whereby a mixture of water and sand was delivered to the rails. Under ideal conditions with fine-grained sand, results were fairly good, but maintenance problems and cost led to reversion to gravity sanding on later engines.

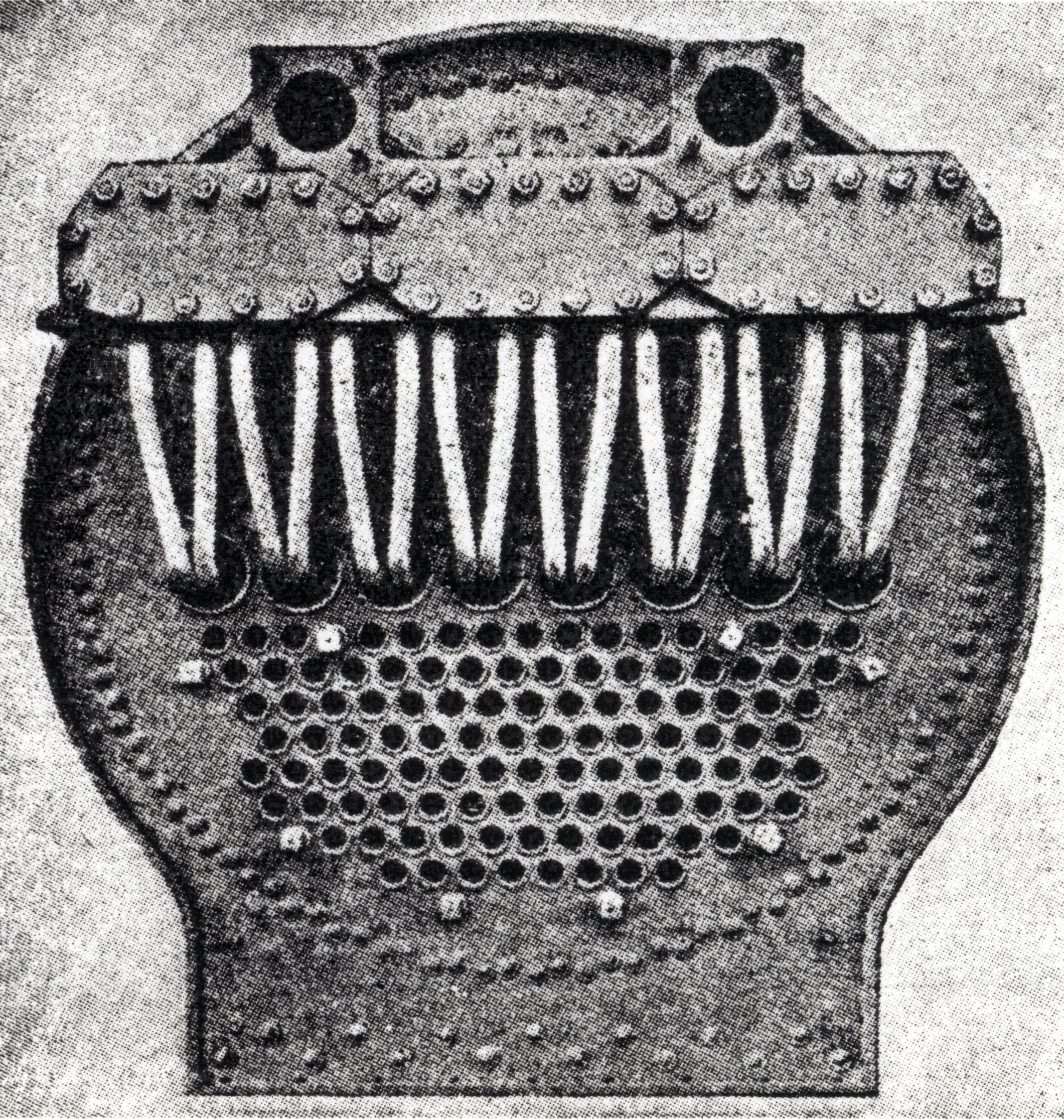
Robinson superheater header

The boilers were fitted with the Robinson type superheater, the first time this type was used on a Hendrie engine. The Robinson header was constructed with compartments, alternately for saturated and superheated steam. There were eight inlet and outlet ends of superheater elements expanded into the bottom wall of each compartment, with the exception of those compartments at each end, into which only three element ends were expanded. Three cover plates were bolted to the front of the header to allow access to the respective compartments, for expanding the element tubes in position or forcing them out when necessary.

== Modifications ==
=== Coupled wheels ===
During 1937, the Class 16C engines were fitted with Stone-Deuta speed indicators. As built, the second coupled axle had flangeless wheels, but these were later retyred with flanges to obtain better distribution of tyre flange wear and improved running.

Like the subsequent Classes 16D and 16DA, the Class 16C locomotives were all delivered with 60 inches (1,524 millimetres) diameter coupled wheels. Their as-delivered boiler operating pressure was set at 190 pounds per square inch (1,310 kilopascals). During 1936, their coupled wheel diameter was enlarged to 63 inches (1,600 millimetres), similar to the modification which was also done on some Classes 16D and 16DA locomotives. In the process, their boiler operating pressure was raised to 200 pounds per square inch (1,380 kilopascals) to not have their tractive effort reduced by the larger coupled wheels.

=== Trofimoff piston valves ===
During 1931, A.G. Watson, CME of the SAR at the time, fitted engine no. 851 with Trofimoff type by-pass piston valves as an experiment. The Trofimoff valve was claimed to afford ideal conditions when drifting.

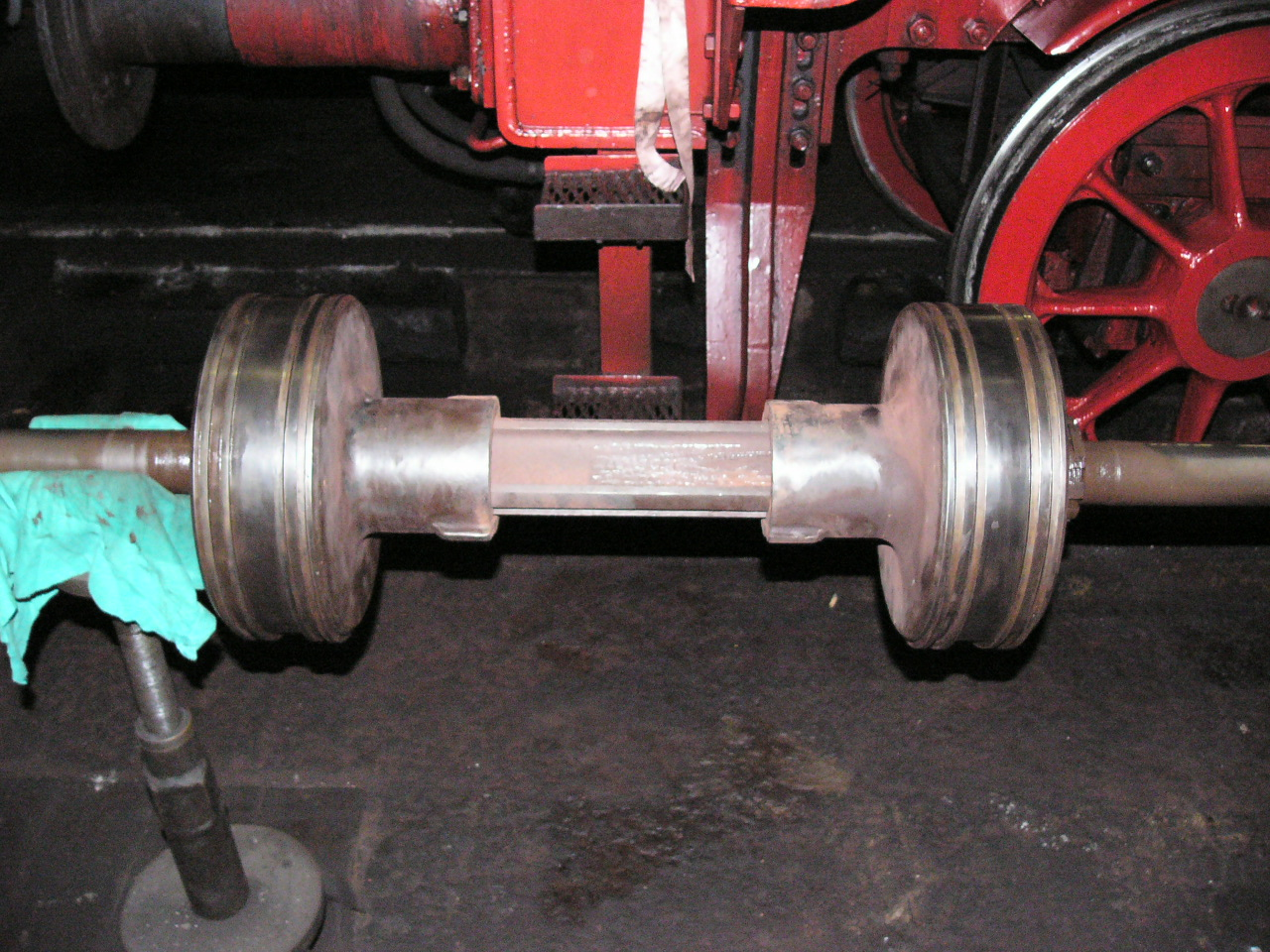
Trofimoff valve, closed

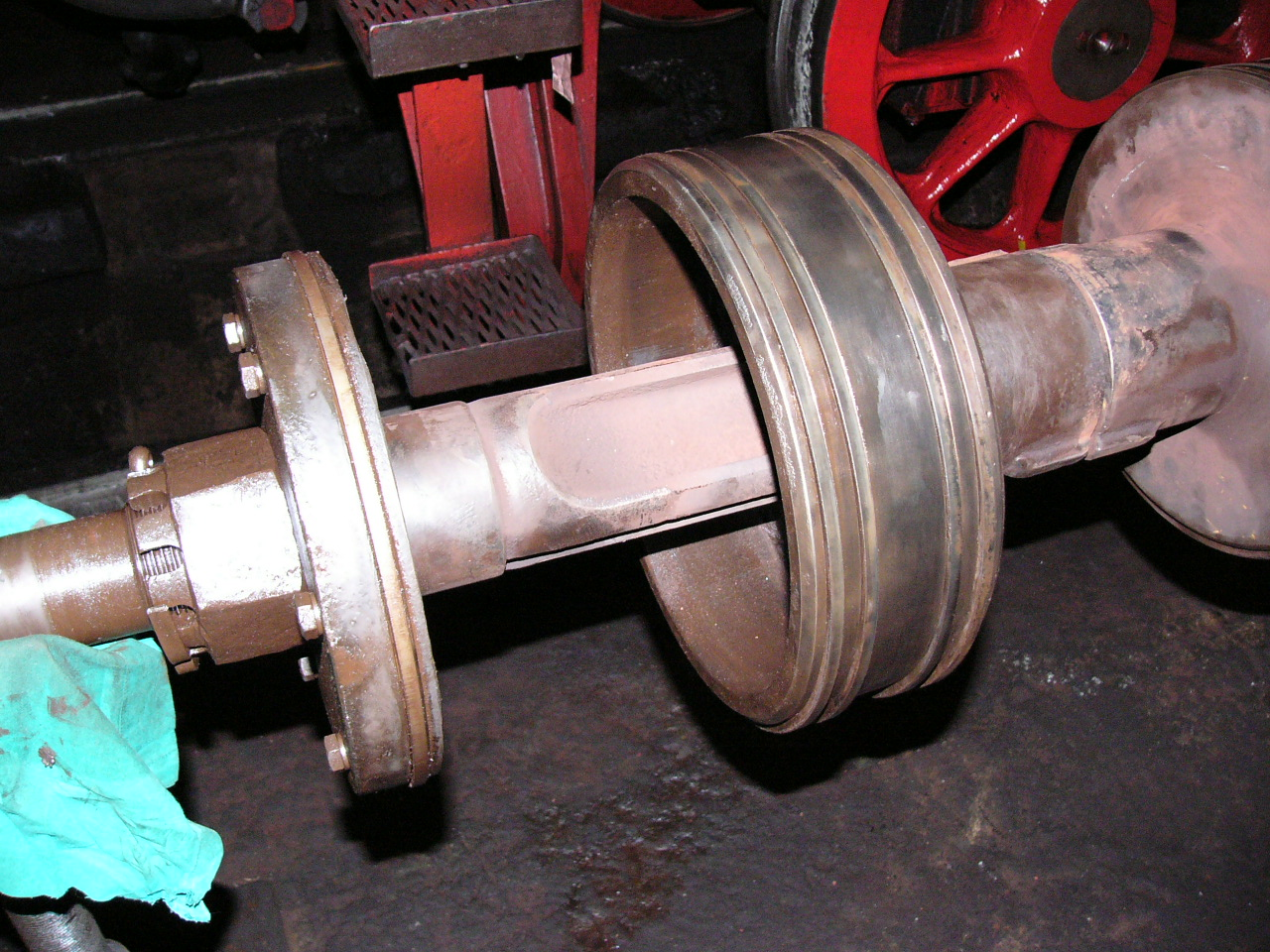
Trofimoff valve, open

It consisted of two fixed discs, secured to the valve spindle, and two junk rings, each carrying a Bull ring and four valve rings and both free to move longitudinally on the spindle. When the regulator is opened, steam forces the loose valve bodies against their respective fixed discs, and they then act as units similar to ordinary piston valves. When steam is shut off, the loose valve heads become detached from their respective discs and remain in their idle positions near the centre of the steam chest, while the valve spindle and fixed disks continue their reciprocating motion with the spindle sliding freely through the now stationary loose valve heads, and with the steam and exhaust ports now in communication. With both ends of the cylinders now in communication, the use of ordinary by-bass or snifting valves became unnecessary.

Further similar experiments were carried out on Class 5B no. 726 in September 1931, Class 16B no. 805 in July 1932, Class 16DA no. 876 in August 1932, Class 15CA no. 2852 in March 1933 and finally on Class 15A no. 1961. The results of these extended tests did not prove entirely satisfactory and all these engines were gradually refitted with standard piston valves and snifting valves.

=== Watson Standard boilers ===
During the 1930s, many serving locomotives were reboilered with a standard boiler type designed by A.G. Watson as part of his standardisation policy. Such Watson Standard reboilered locomotives were reclassified by adding an "R" suffix to their classification.

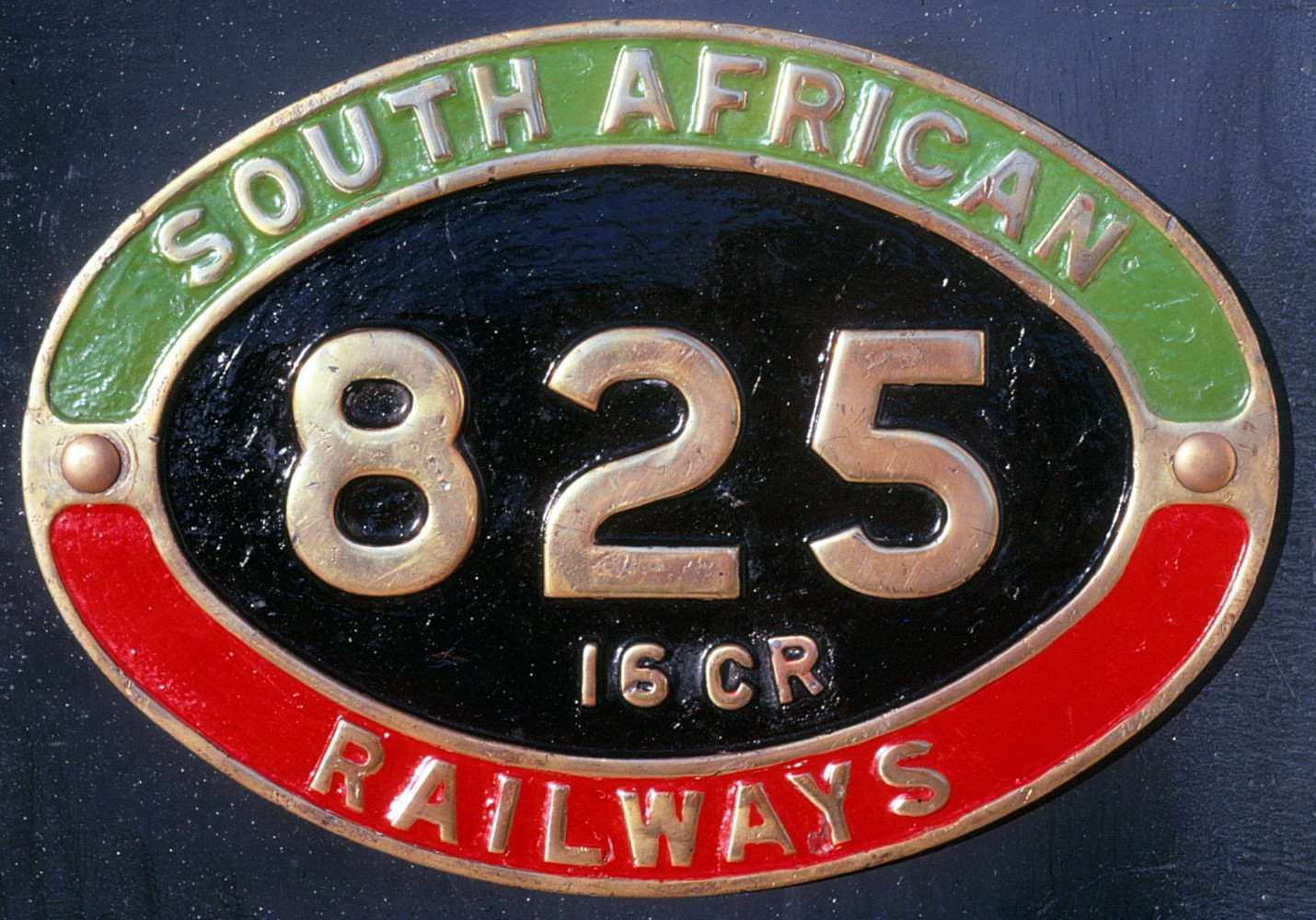
SAR Class 16CR no. 825 English-only number plate

Eventually all thirty Class 16C locomotives were reboilered with Watson Standard no. 2B boilers and reclassified to Class 16CR. Several alterations to the engine frames were necessary to accommodate the no. 2B boiler. Bearing brackets had to be provided on the bridle casting to suit the firebox support sliding shoes fitted at the front of the firebox foundation ring. The frame had to be altered to suit the new wider Watson cab with its slanted front to allow access to the lagging which covered the flexible stays and stay caps on the firebox sides.

A steam operated firedoor was fitted, permitting the stoker to operate the door by means of a foot treadle, while an auxiliary operating handle allowed the driver to operate the door in situations where this was found more convenient. The ashpan was attached to the engine frame instead of to the boiler to enable the boiler to be removed from the frame without disturbing the ashpan, an innovation which became standard practice on the SAR.

Their original Belpaire boilers were fitted with Ramsbottom safety valves, while the Watson Standard boiler was fitted with Pop safety valves. Early conversions were equipped with copper and later conversions with steel fireboxes. After reboilering, the main difference between the Class 16B and Class 16C, Hendrie's combustion chamber behind the Class 16C's boiler, disappeared and Class 16B locomotives which were reboilered with Watson Standard boilers were also reclassified to Class 16CR.

=== Tenders ===
In the 1930s several Braamfontein-based Class 16C locomotives were fitted with larger capacity Type MT tenders for working mainline passenger trains to Kimberley and Bloemfontein.

== Service ==
The Class 16C proved to be excellent locomotives which were popular with the locomotive crews, being free-steaming, fast, reliable, with quick acceleration and a reserve of power greater than that of either the Class 16 or Class 16B. On one occasion in 1922, one of them working between Bloemfontein and Kroonstad hauled a train of eighteen mainline saloons, a load which would have been considered good for the much more modern Class 15F of 1938.

=== South African Railways ===
The Class 16C Pacifics were placed in express passenger service working out of Pretoria and Johannesburg and hauling all the important passenger trains of the time, such as the Natal mail train on the section between Johannesburg and Volksrust and the Cape mail train on the section between Johannesburg and Klerksdorp. By the 1930s they hauled the Cape train right through to Kimberley.

When they were replaced by newer locomotives like the Class 16D, they were relegated to less glamorous passenger duties until, by the 1940s, they were in suburban and transfer service. During the 1950s some were relocated to Durban to assist the Class 14Rs on the South Coast line. When this line was electrified in 1967, they were again relocated, this time to Port Elizabeth where they worked suburban trains to Uitenhage.

Others remained on the Witwatersrand, working the suburban to Springs and Nigel, double-heading with Class 15ARs on Pietersburg-bound trains out of Pretoria, as well as shunting and local pick-up duties. Some of their last passenger duties were on the Breyten line during 1967 and 1968.

They were sure-footed enough to take to shunting work as readily as to the fast passenger service for which they were originally designed, to the extent that some of their last duties at the Springs shed was to take over shunting duties from the Class S2 shunting locomotives. They were withdrawn from service between 1975 and 1976, with some being sold to start a second career in industrial service.

=== Industry ===
Two Class 16CRs, numbers 813 and 818, were sold to Dunn's Locomotive Works to be employed at Delmas Colliery. They were at one time seconded to Durban Navigation Collieries (Durnacol) in Natal. No. 838 went to Klipfontein Organic Products and later to the St Helena Gold Mine, and five went directly to the St Helena Gold Mine. At St Helena they were, as best as could be ascertained, renumbered as shown in the table.

St Helena Gold Mine Class 16CR
SAR No.	SHGM No.
815	6
817	5
819	2
821	1
838	3
839	4

== Preservation ==
Number	Works nmr	THF / Private	Leaselend / Owner	Current Location	Outside South Africa	?
805	NBL 21495	THF	Transnet Heritage Foundation	Outiniqua Transport Museum		16Cr rebuilt to 16B
809	NBL 21499	THF		Queenstown Locomotive Depot		
816	NBL 21712	Private	Heidelberg Transport Museum	Heidelberg (Johannesburg)		
821	NBL 21717	Private	Sandstone Heritage Trust	Sandstone Estate		
840	NBL 22734	THF		Krugersdorp Locomotive Depot		

== Illustration ==
The main picture and those following offer views of the Class 16C locomotive before reboilering and with its original cab, and the Class 16CR after reboilering and with the Watson cab.

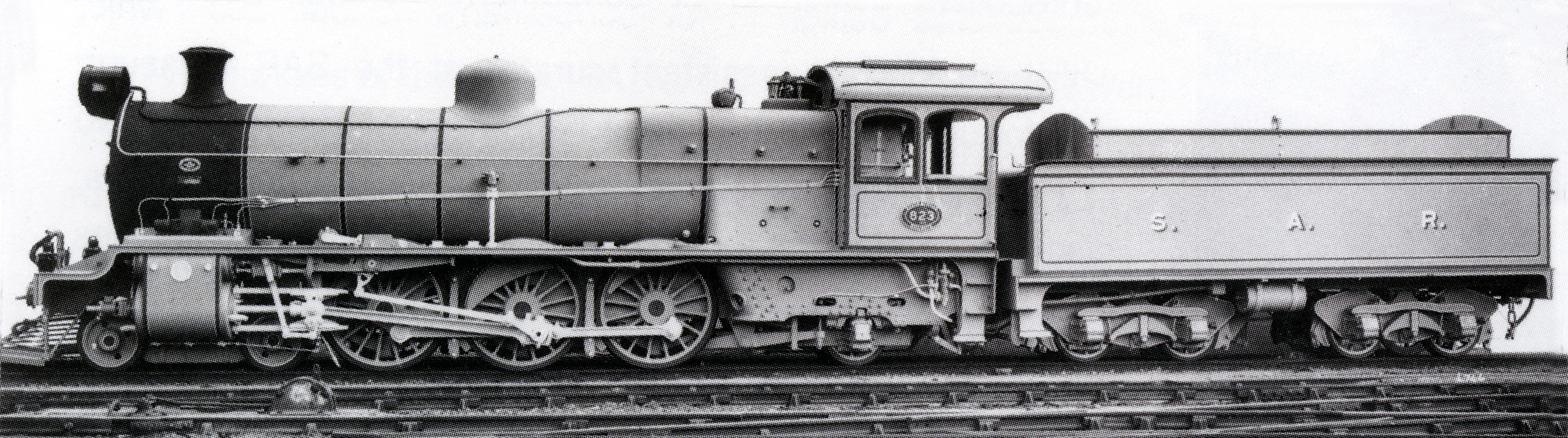
NBL builders's picture of Class 16C no. 823, c. 1921

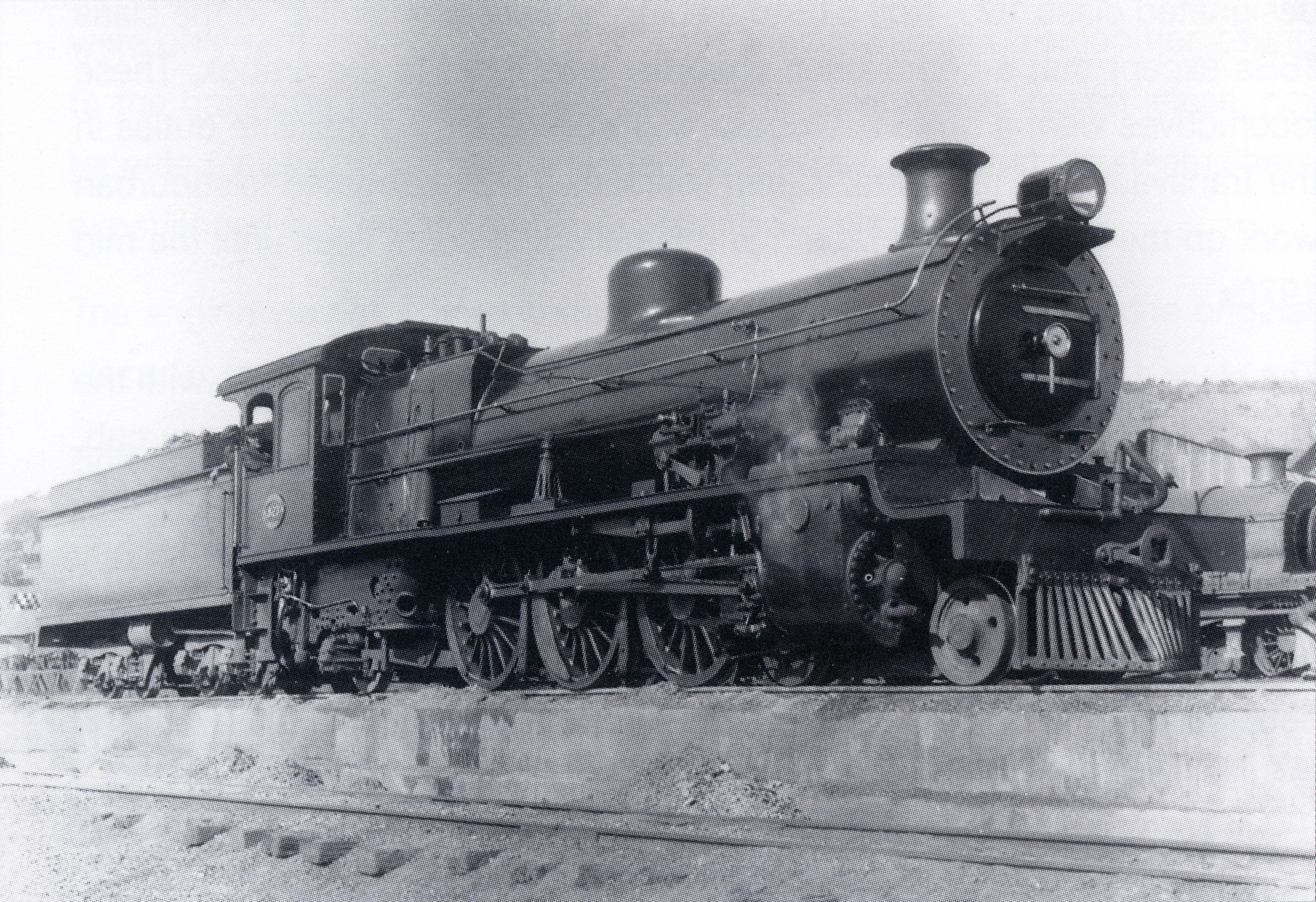
Class 16C no. 823 before reboilering, c. 1930

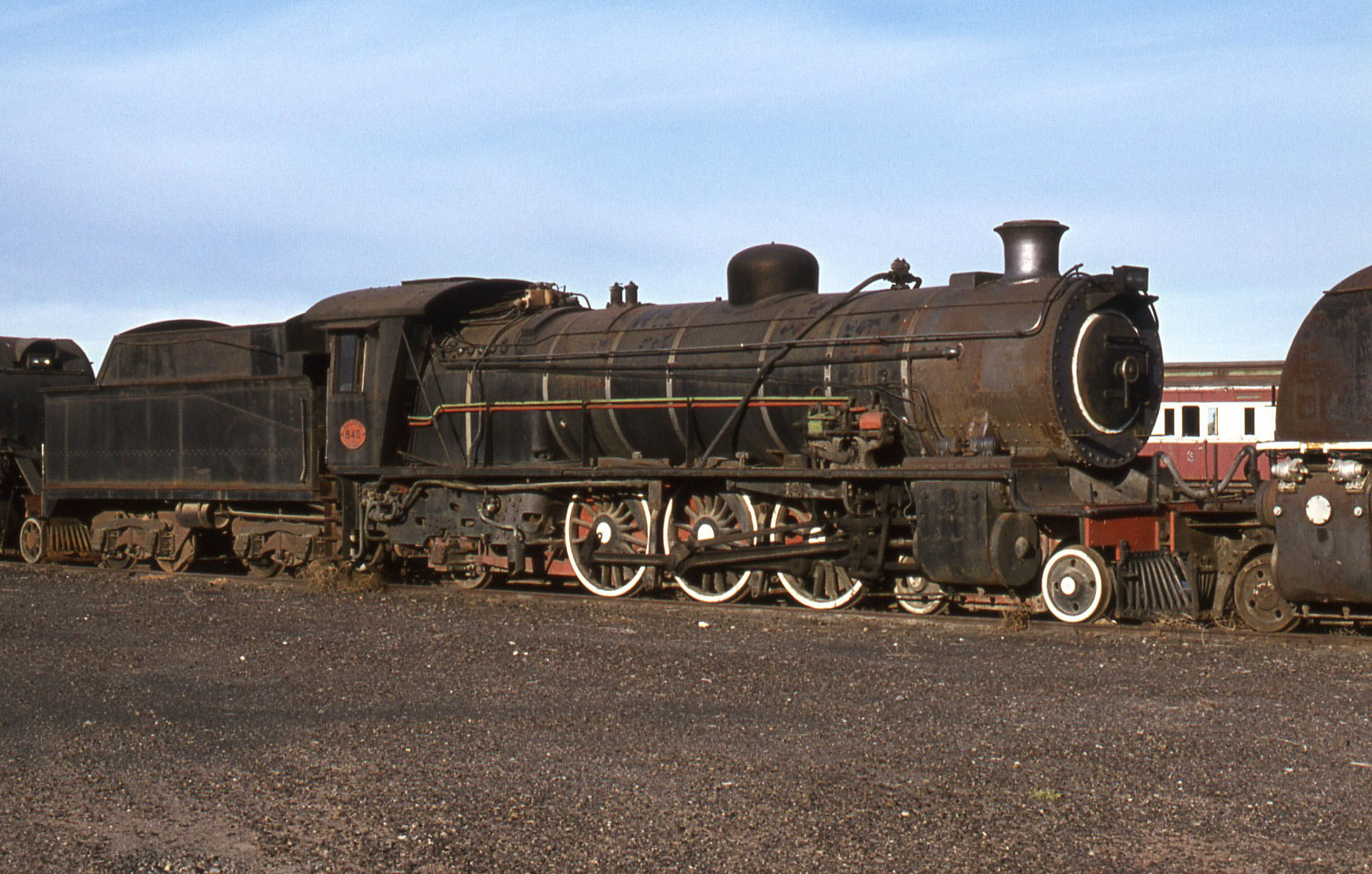
Class 16CR no. 840 at De Aar, 1978

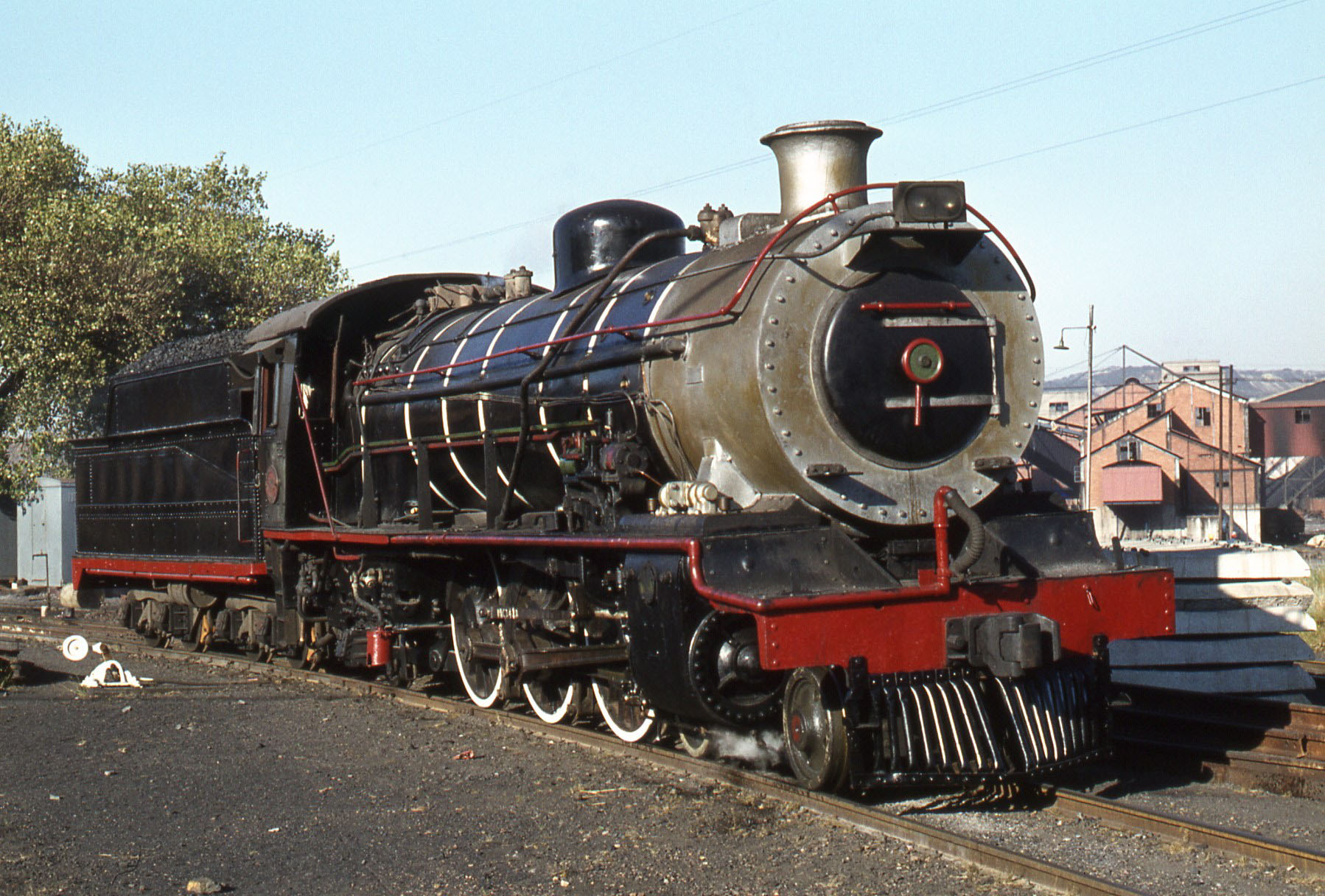
Class 16CR no. 813 as Durnacol no. 2, Dannhauser, 1979

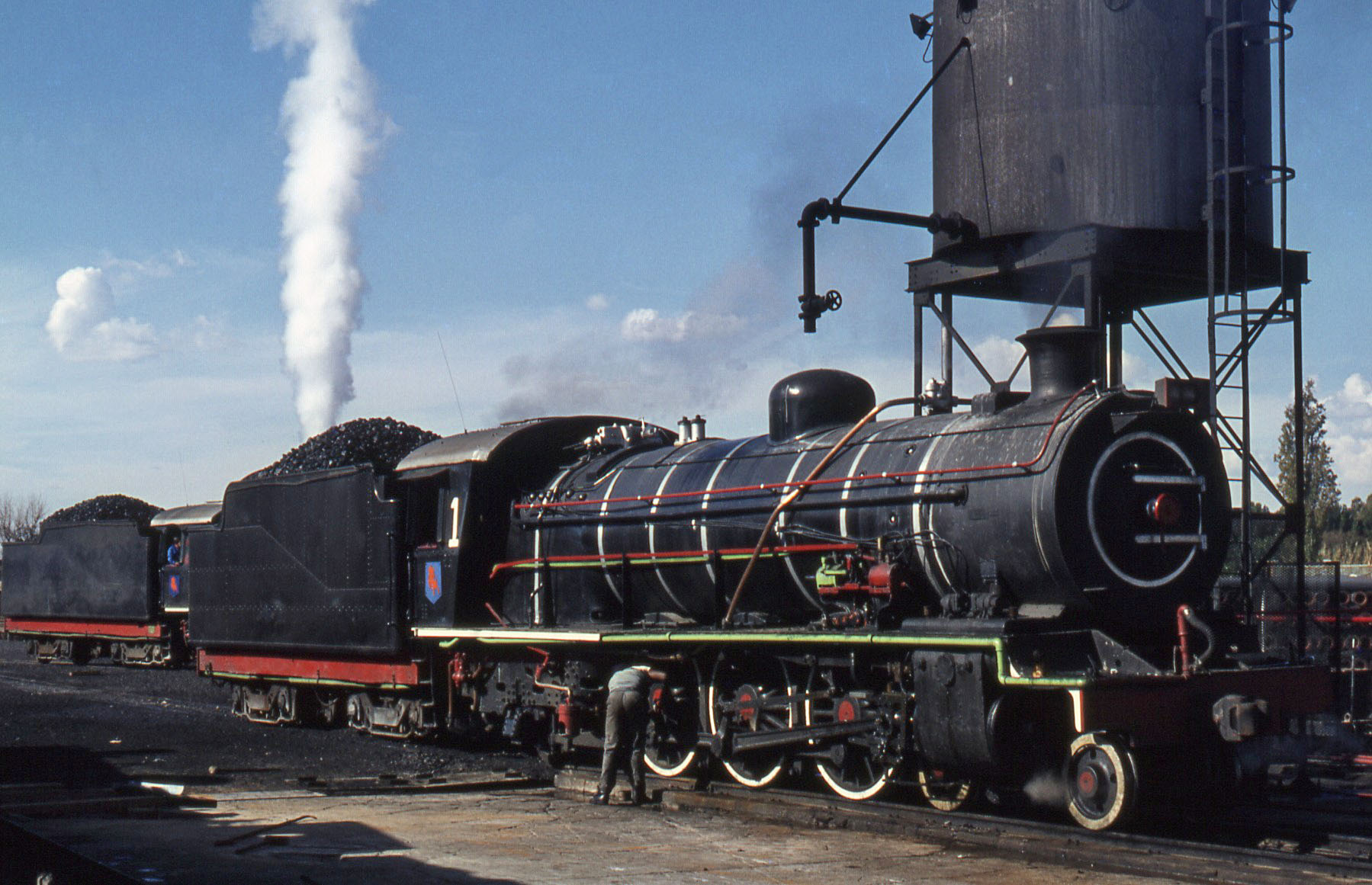
Class 16CR no. 821 as St Helena Gold Mine no. 1, 1981
