= South African Class 16B 4-6-2 =

1917 design of steam locomotive

South African Class 16B & 16CR 4-6-2
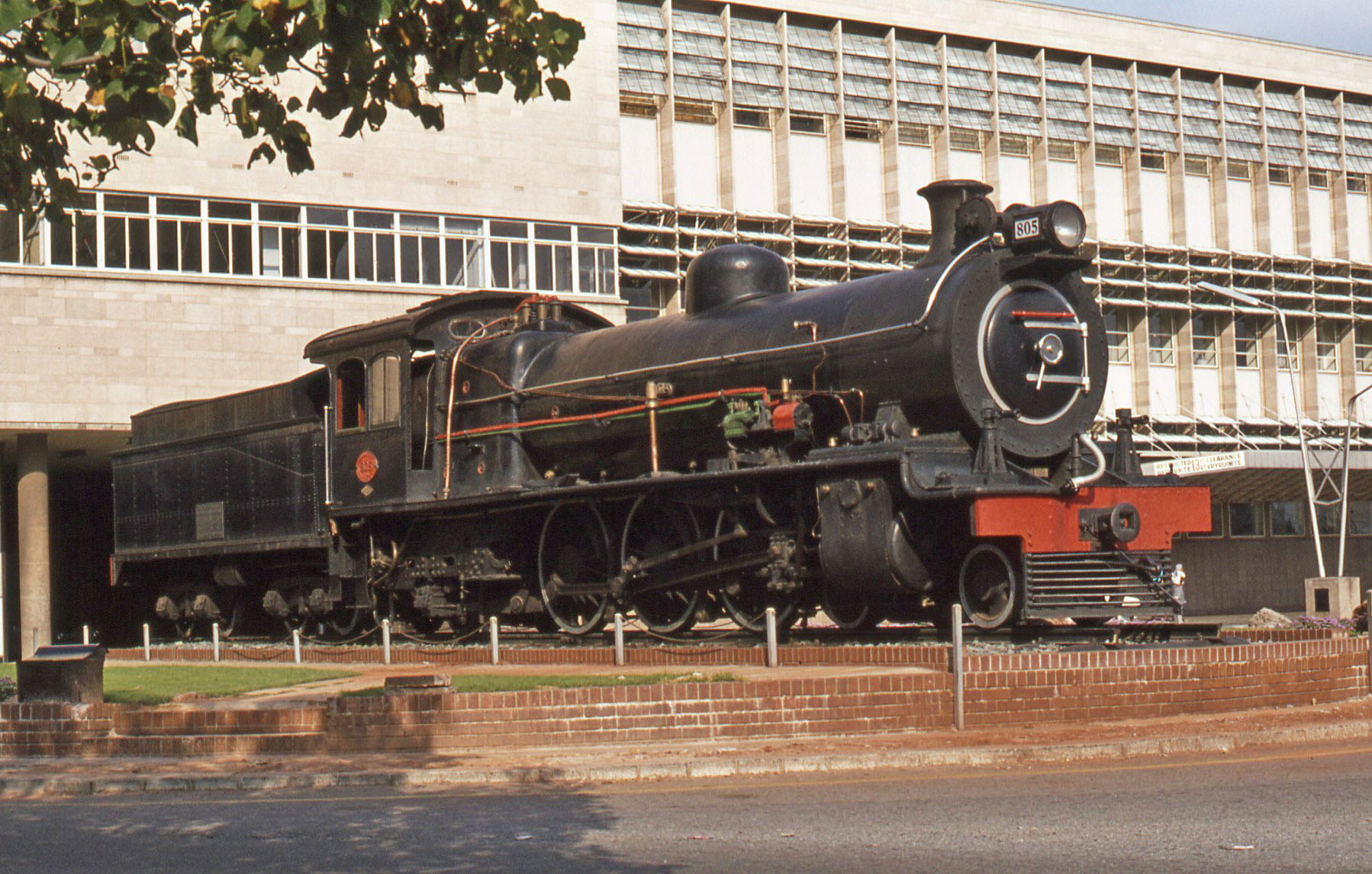
- No. 805 plinthed at Johannesburg station, 1978
Type and origin
- ♠ Class 16B as built with a Belpaire firebox ♥ Class 16CR rebuilt with a Watson Standard boiler ♣ Steel firebox – ♦ Copper firebox
- Power type: Steam
- Designer: South African Railways (D.A. Hendrie)
- Builder: North British Locomotive Company
- Serial number: 21492-21501
- Model: Class 16B
- Build date: 1917
- Total produced: 10
Specifications
- Configuration
  - Whyte: 4-6-2 (Pacific)
  - UIC: 2'C1'h2
- Driver: 2nd coupled axle
- Gauge: 3 ft 6 in (1,067 mm) Cape gauge
- Leading dia.: 30 in (762 mm)
- Coupled dia.: ♠ 60 in (1,524 mm) ♥ 63 in (1,600 mm)
- Trailing dia.: 33 in (838 mm)
- Tender wheels: 34 in (864 mm)
- Wheelbase: 55 ft 11 3/4 in (17,062 mm)
  - Engine: 29 ft 5 1/2 in (8,979 mm)
  - Leading: 6 ft 2 in (1,880 mm)
  - Coupled: 10 ft 9 in (3,277 mm)
  - Tender: 16 ft 9 in (5,105 mm)
  - Tender bogie: 4 ft 7 in (1,397 mm)
- Length
  - Over couplers: 64 ft 4 1/8 in (19,612 mm)
- Height: ♠ 12 ft 10 in (3,912 mm) ♥ 12 ft 11 1/4 in (3,943 mm)
- Frame type: Plate
- Axle load: ♠ 18 LT (18,290 kg) ♥♣ 17 LT 14 cwt (17,980 kg)
  - Leading: ♠ 16 LT 3 cwt (16,410 kg) ♥♣ 16 LT 12 cwt (16,870 kg)
  - 1st coupled: ♠ 18 LT (18,290 kg) ♥♣ 17 LT 11 cwt (17,830 kg)
  - 2nd coupled: ♠ 18 LT (18,290 kg) ♥♣ 17 LT 14 cwt (17,980 kg)
  - 3rd coupled: ♠ 17 LT 18 cwt (18,190 kg) ♥♣ 17 LT 11 cwt (17,830 kg)
  - Trailing: ♠ 13 LT 12 cwt (13,820 kg) ♥♣ 13 LT 7 cwt (13,560 kg)
  - Tender bogie: Bogie 1: 27 LT 10 cwt (27,940 kg); Bogie 2: 23 LT 11 cwt (23,930 kg)
  - Tender axle: 13 LT 15 cwt (13,970 kg)
- Adhesive weight: ♠ 53 LT 18 cwt (54,760 kg) ♥♣ 52 LT 16 cwt (53,650 kg)
- Loco weight: ♠ 83 LT 13 cwt (84,990 kg) ♥♣ 82 LT 15 cwt (84,080 kg)
- Tender weight: 51 LT 1 cwt (51,870 kg)
- Total weight: ♠ 134 LT 14 cwt (136,900 kg) ♥♣ 133 LT 16 cwt (135,900 kg)
- Tender type: MP1 (2-axle bogies); MP, MP1, MR, MS, MT, MT1, MT2, MX, MY, MY1 permitted
- Fuel type: Coal
- Fuel capacity: 10 LT (10.2 t)
- Water cap.: 4,250 imp gal (19,300 L)
- Firebox
  - Type: ♠ Belpaire ♥ Round-top
  - Grate area: ♠♥ 37 sq ft (3.4 m^{2})
- Boiler
  - Model: Watson Standard no. 2B
  - Pitch: ♠ 7 ft 9 in (2,362 mm) ♥ 8 ft (2,438 mm)
  - Diameter: ♠ 5 ft 4 5/8 in (1,641 mm) ♥ 5 ft 7 1/2 in (1,714 mm)
  - Tube plates: ♠ 18 ft 3 in (5,563 mm) ♥♣ 18 ft 4 in (5,588 mm) ♥♦ 18 ft 3 5/8 in (5,578 mm)
  - Small tubes: ♠ 131: 2 1/4 in (57 mm) ♥ 87: 2 1/2 in (64 mm)
  - Large tubes: ♠ 24: 5 1/2 in (140 mm) ♥ 30: 5 1/2 in (140 mm)
- Boiler pressure: ♠ 190 psi (1,310 kPa) ♥ 200 psi (1,379 kPa)
- Safety valve: ♠ Ramsbottom ♥ Pop
- Heating surface
  - Firebox: ♠ 146 sq ft (13.6 m^{2}) ♥ 142 sq ft (13.2 m^{2})
  - Tubes: ♠ 2,040 sq ft (190 m^{2}) ♥ 1,836 sq ft (170.6 m^{2})
  - Total surface: ♠ 2,186 sq ft (203.1 m^{2}) ♥ 1,978 sq ft (183.8 m^{2})
- Superheater
  - Heating area: ♠ 515 sq ft (47.8 m^{2}) ♥ 472 sq ft (43.9 m^{2})
- Cylinders: Two
- Cylinder size: 22 in (559 mm) bore 26 in (660 mm) stroke
- Valve gear: Walschaerts
- Valve type: Piston
- Couplers: Johnston link-and-pin AAR knuckle (1930s)
Performance figures
- Tractive effort: ♠ 29,890 lbf (133.0 kN) @ 75% ♥ 29,960 lbf (133.3 kN) @ 75%
Career
- Operators: South African Railways
- Class: Class 16B & 16CR
- Number in class: 10
- Numbers: 802–811
- Delivered: 1917
- First run: 1917
- Withdrawn: 1976
- The 2nd coupled axle had flangeless wheels

The South African Railways Class 16B 4-6-2 of 1917 was a steam locomotive.

In November 1917, the South African Railways placed ten Class 16B steam locomotives with a 4-6-2 Pacific type wheel arrangement in passenger train service.

== Manufacturer ==
The Class 16B 4-6-2 Pacific type locomotive was designed by D.A. Hendrie, Chief Mechanical Engineer (CME) of the South African Railways (SAR), and built in 1917 by the North British Locomotive Company (NBL) in Glasgow, Scotland. Ten locomotives were delivered and placed in service in November 1917, numbered in the range from 802 to 811.

== Characteristics ==
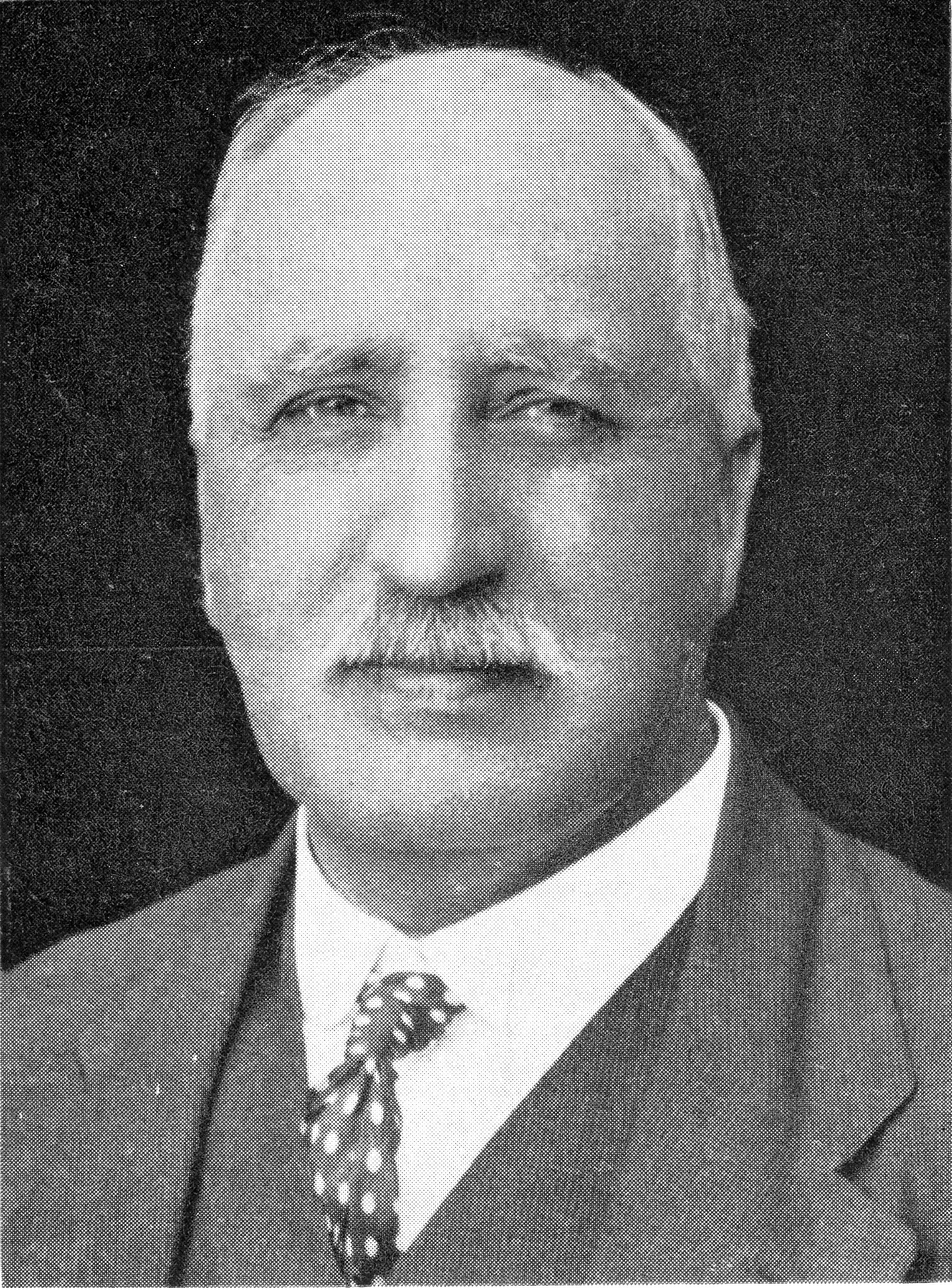
D.A. Hendrie

They were identical to the predecessor Class 16 and successor Class 16C in most respects, except that they had wider cabs than the Class 16, while the Class 16C was equipped with a combustion chamber in the firebox. Other minor alterations from the Class 16's characteristics were the injector and some cab and footplate arrangements.

During 1936, the coupled wheels were enlarged from 60 to 63 inches (1,524 to 1,600 millimetres) diameter and the boiler pressure setting accordingly adjusted from 190 to 200 pounds per square inch (1,310 to 1,379 kilopascals), which raised their tractive effort slightly from 29,890 to 29,960 pounds-force (133.0 to 133.3 kilonewtons) at 75% of boiler pressure.

== Watson Standard boilers ==
During the 1930s, many serving locomotives were reboilered with a standard boiler type designed by A.G. Watson, CME of the SAR at the time, as part of his standardisation policy. Such Watson Standard reboilered locomotives were reclassified by adding an "R" suffix to their classification.

Eventually all ten Class 16B locomotives as well as all thirty Class 16C locomotives were reboilered with Watson Standard no 2B boilers. In the process of reboilering, the main difference between the Class 16B and Class 16C, Hendrie's combustion chamber behind the Class 16C boiler, disappeared and the reboilered Class 16B locomotives were also reclassified to Class 16CR. Early conversions were equipped with copper and later conversions with steel fireboxes. In the process, they were also equipped with Watson cabs with their distinctive slanted fronts, compared to the conventional vertical fronts of their original cabs.

Some ex Class 16B locomotives erroneously received new number plates after reboilering which identified them as Class 16BR, even though such an SAR Class never officially existed.

Their original Belpaire boilers were fitted with Ramsbottom safety valves, while the Watson Standard boiler was fitted with Pop safety valves. An obvious visual difference between an original and a Watson Standard reboilered locomotive is usually a rectangular regulator cover, just to the rear of the chimney on the reboilered locomotive. In the case of the Class 16B and Class 16CR, two even more obvious differences are the Watson cab and the absence of the Belpaire firebox hump between the cab and boiler on the reboilered locomotives.

== Service ==
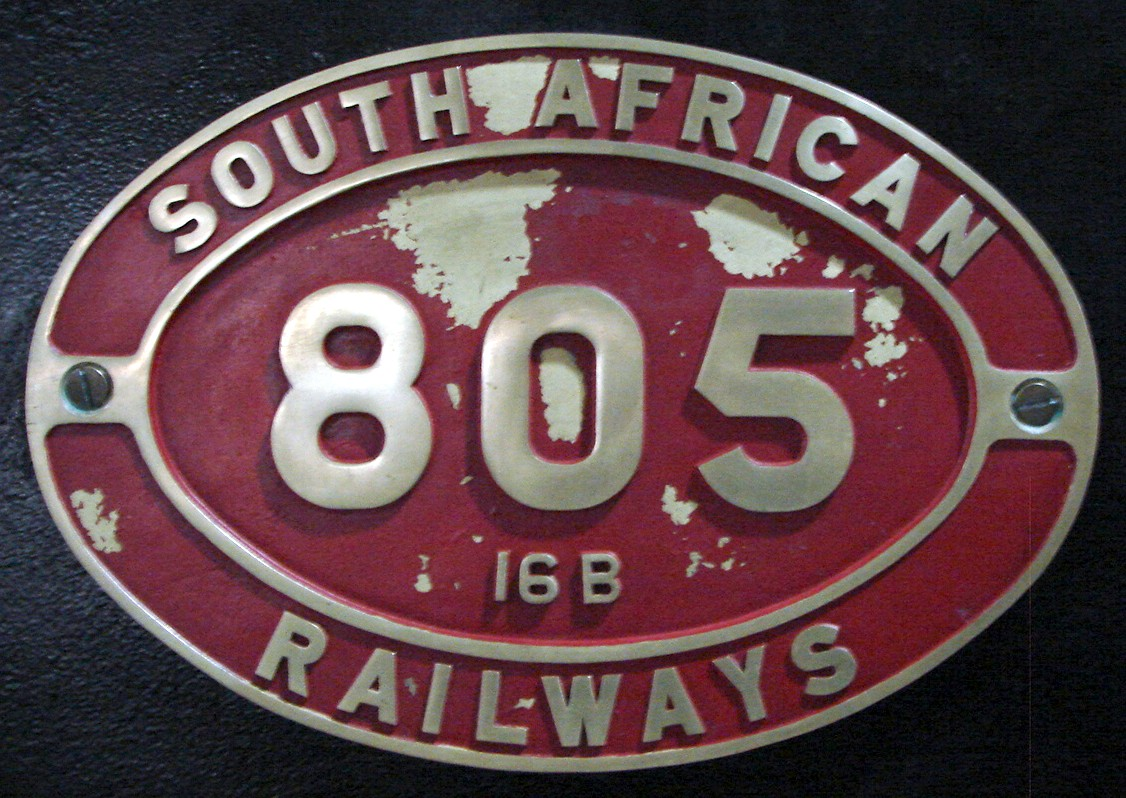

The Class 16B Pacifics were placed in express passenger service, working fast passenger services between Pretoria and Johannesburg and hauling all the important passenger trains of the time, such as the Natal mail train on the section between Johannesburg and Volksrust and the Cape mail train on the section between Johannesburg and Klerksdorp. When they were replaced by newer locomotives like the Class 16D, they were relegated to less glamorous passenger duties until, by the 1940s, they were in suburban and transfer service.

During the 1950s, some were relocated to Durban to assist the Class 14R on the South Coast line. When this line was electrified in 1967, they were again relocated, this time to Port Elizabeth, where they worked suburban trains to Uitenhage. Others remained on the Witwatersrand, working the suburban to Springs and Nigel, double-heading with Class 15ARs on Pietersburg-bound trains out of Pretoria, as well as shunting and local pickup service. They were withdrawn from service between 1975 and 1976.

Two of these locomotives have some claim to fame. In its original form as a class 16B, no. 809 was painted in royal blue livery, with the main frames painted in a lilac colour to off-set the blue boiler and cab. It worked the 1934 Royal Train from Johannesburg to Klerksdorp during the visit to South Africa of His Royal Highness Prince George, Duke of Kent.

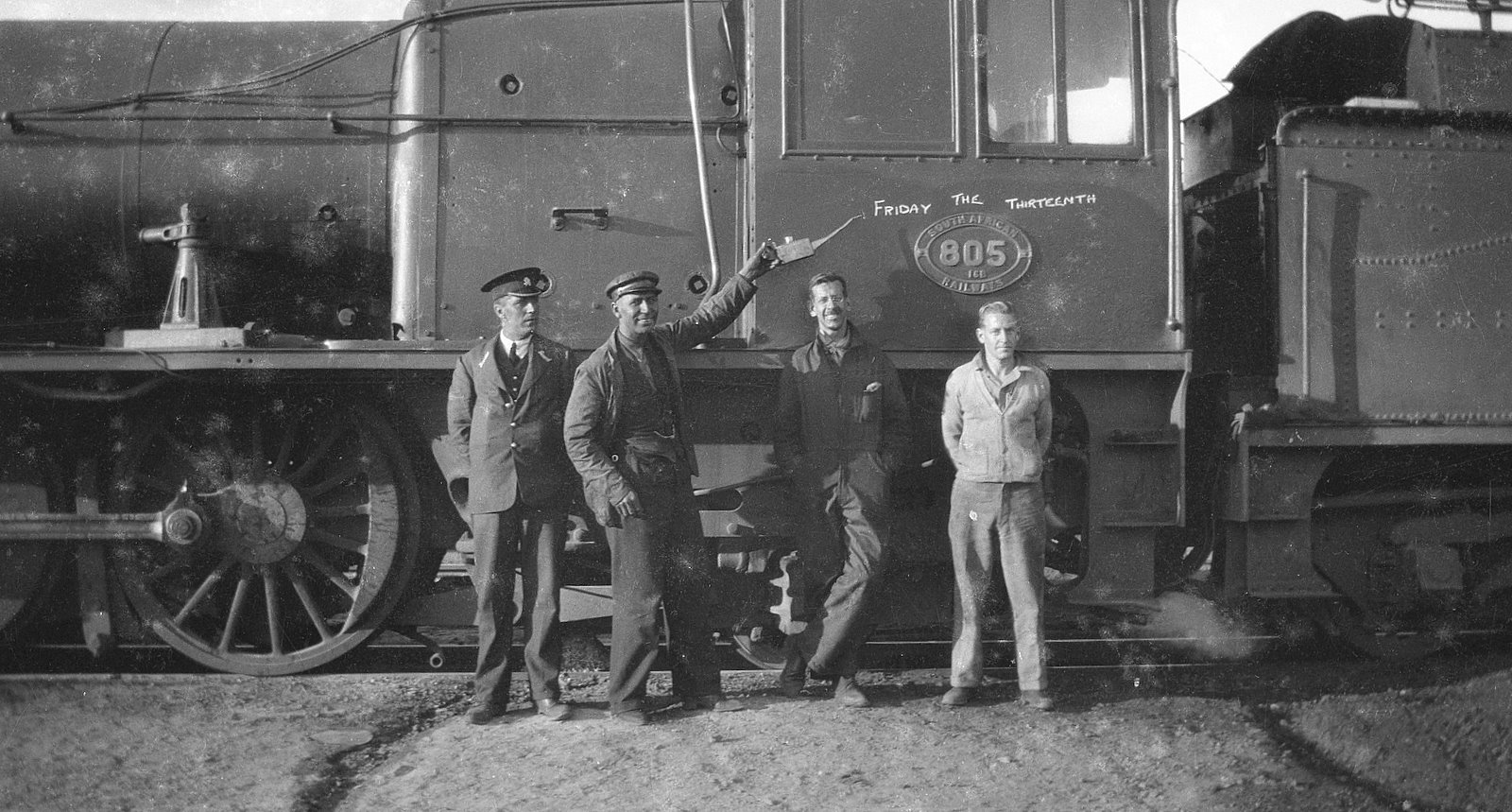
Ben Schoeman as fireman, standing below the number plate, c. 1935

Long-time South African Minister of Transport Ben Schoeman started his Railway career at Braamfontein during the 1930s as a stoker on no. 805. When no. 805 was withdrawn from service, by then reboilered and reclassified to Class 16CR, this locomotive was actually de-reboilered to its original Class 16B condition. A dummy boiler which looked like the original boiler with its Belpaire firebox was fabricated and installed and it was refitted with an original wide Hendrie cab which was found dumped at the old Pretoria Mechanical Workshops.

It was then plinthed outside the new Johannesburg station on 18 and 19 March 1974, with the work taking two days to complete. The Minister of Transport, the Hon. B.J. Schoeman, unveiled the commemorative plaque during a ceremony on 1 July 1974.

In the early 1990s, the locomotive was removed from Johannesburg station to be exhibited in the Outeniqua Transport Museum at George.

== Preservation ==
Number	Works nmr	THF / Private	Leaselend / Owner	Current Location	Outside South Africa	?
805		THF	Transnet Heritage Foundation	Outiniqua Transport Museum		16Cr rebuilt to 16B
809		THF		Queenstown Locomotive Depot		
816		Private	Heidelberg Transport Museum	Heidelberg (Johannesburg)		
821		Private	Sandstone Heritage Trust	Sandstone Estate		
840		THF		Krugersdorp Locomotive Depot		

== Illustration ==
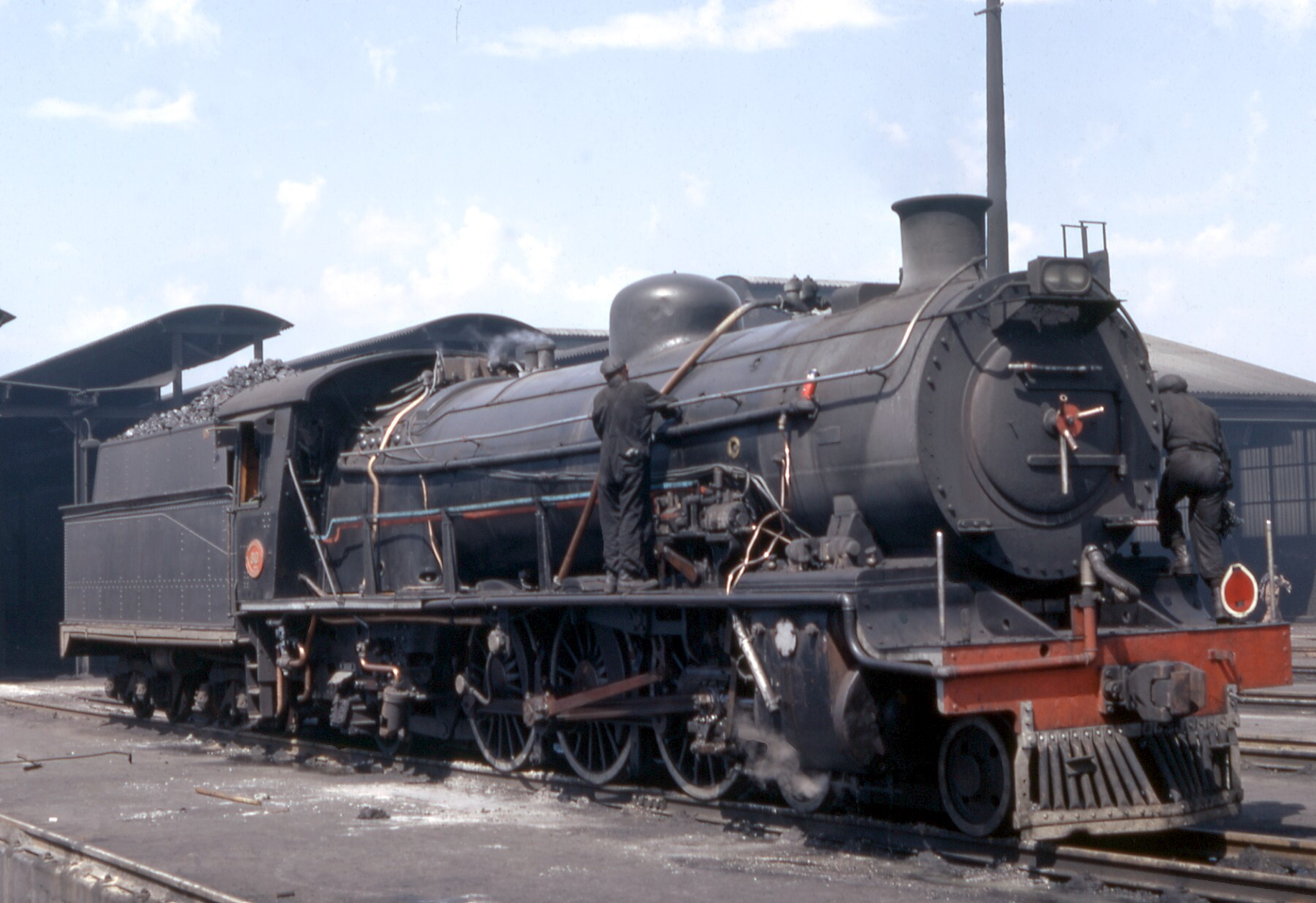
16CR no. 810 with a modified Type MP1 tender, Sydenham, November 1971

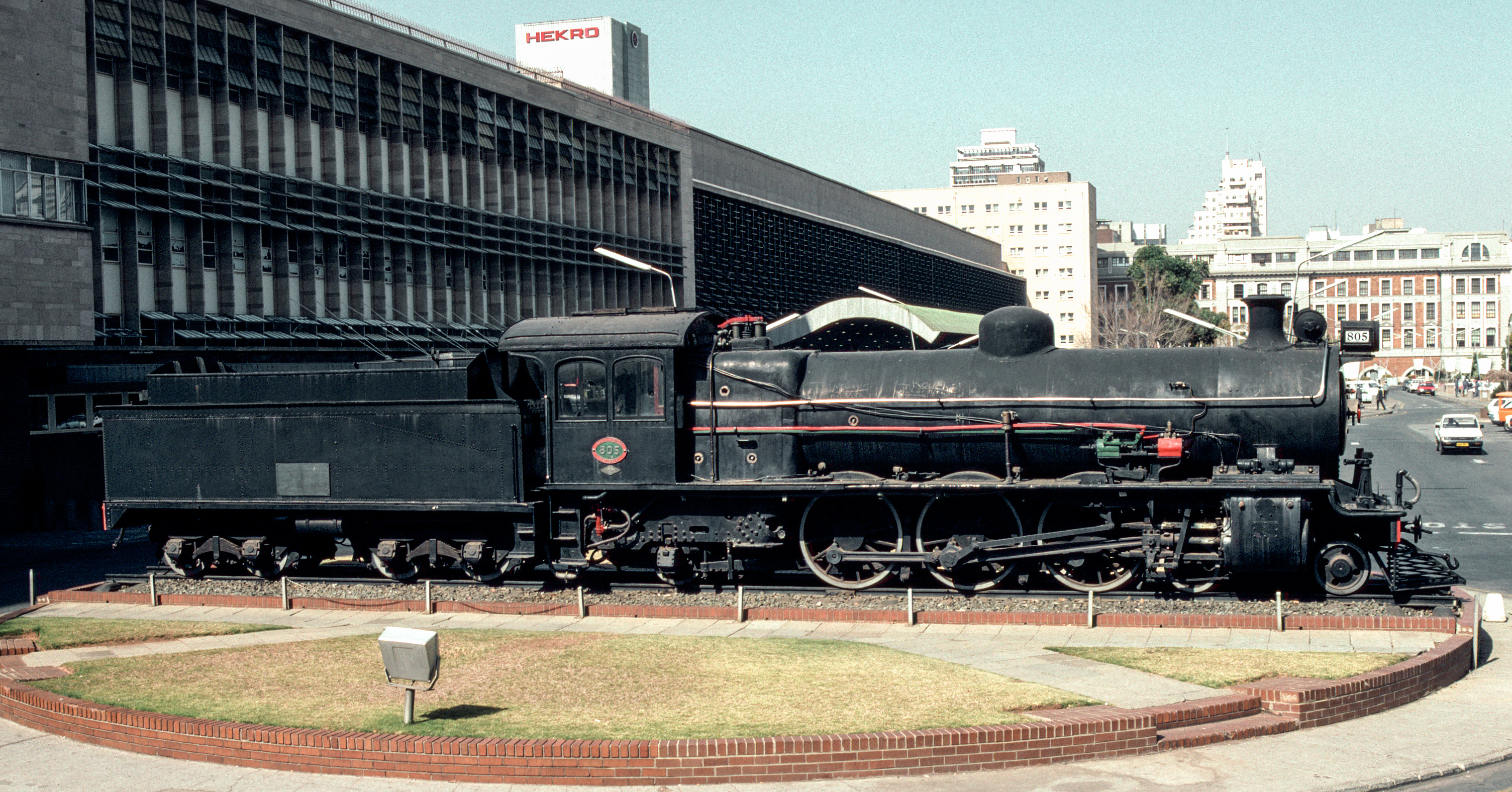
Class 16B 4-6-2 no. 805 (built by North British Locomotive Co. in 1917) plinthed outside Johannesburg station.

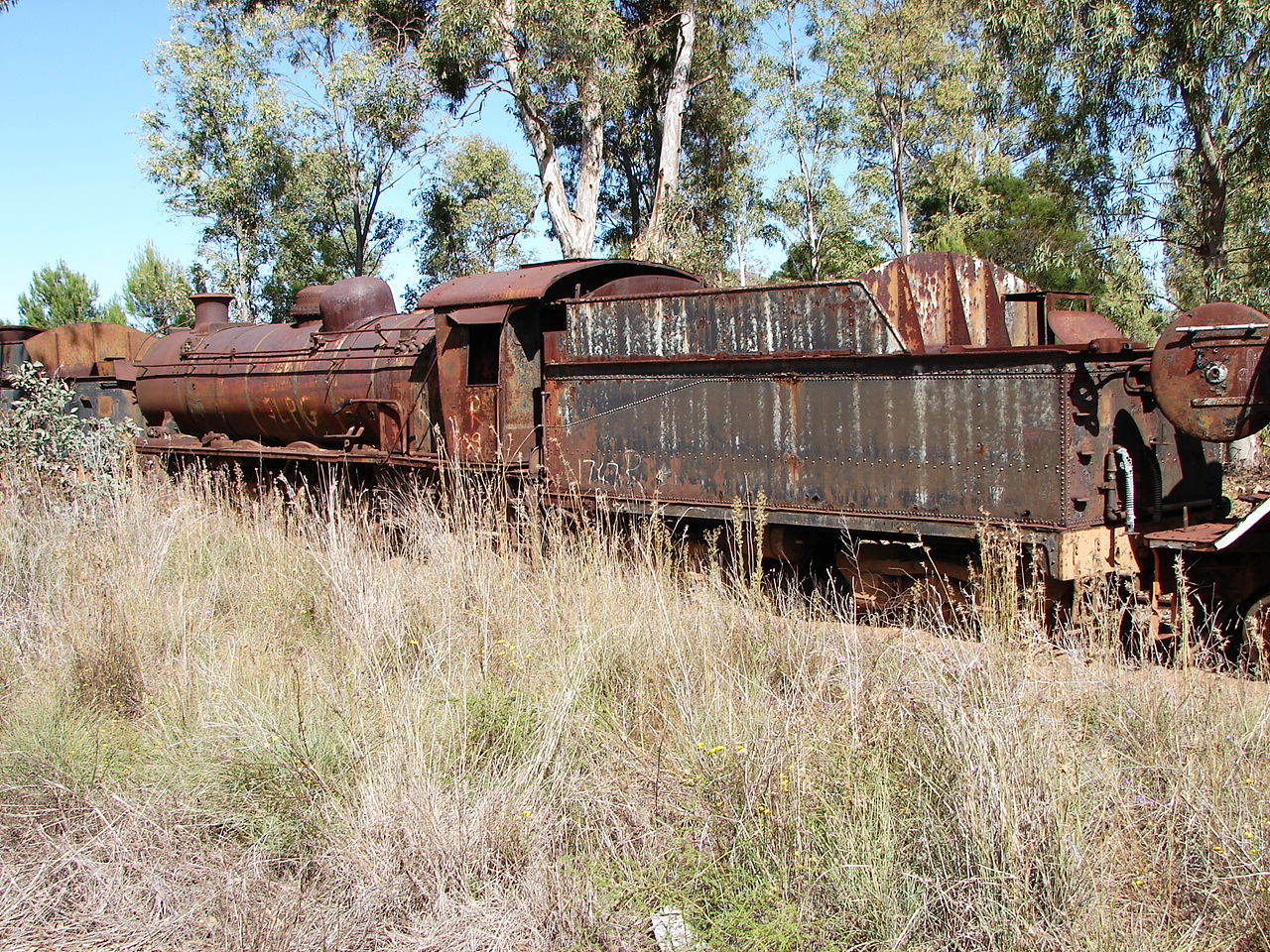
16CR no. 809 with a modified Type MP1 tender, rusting in peace at Queenstown, April 2013
